= 510s =

Decade

The 510s decade ran from January 1, 510, to December 31, 519.

== Events ==
=== By place ===
==== Britannia ====
- Battle of Llongborth (possibly Langport or Portsmouth): King Budic II of Brittany seeks refuge at the court of Aergol Lawhir, in Dyfed (Wales) after the battle.

==== Europe ====
- King Theodoric the Great raises the Frankish siege at Arles; the city is heroically defended by its inhabitants, assisted by the Ostrogothic general Theudis. The Ostrogoths overrun Provence (Southern Gaul), and consolidate their gains in the region.
- Theodoric the Great appoints his friend Anicius Manlius Severinus Boethius, Roman philosopher, to the rank of consul of the Ostrogothic Kingdom.

==== Persian Empire ====
- The Sasanian Persians conquer the independent kingdom of Caucasian Albania, a state converted to Christianity in the 4th century by Armenian missionaries (approximate date).

=== By place ===
==== Byzantine Empire ====
- Riots erupt in the streets of Antioch, between supporters of Patriarch Flavian II and Emperor Anastasius I, in sympathy with Non-Chalcedonianism.

==== Europe ====
- November 27 – King Clovis I dies at Paris (Lutetia) at age 45, and is buried in the Abbey of St. Genevieve. The Merovingian dynasty is continued by his four sons (Theuderic I, Chlodomer, Childebert I and Chlothar I), who divide the Frankish Kingdom and rule from the capitals at Metz, Orléans, Paris and Soissons, respectively.
- Ostrogothic King Theodoric the Great assumes the regency over Amalaric, his grandson and future king of the Visigothic Kingdom - Theodoric now rules over territory stretching from the Atlantic Ocean to the Adriatic Sea.

=== By topic ===
==== Inventions ====
- Aryabhata, Indian astronomer and mathematician, comes up with concepts of mathematical equations, one of which explains the rotation of the Earth on its axis. This concept is far ahead of its time and he is fairly accurate in his description of it. He also comes up with a lot of other ideas about the Solar System, but many of them are flawed because he considers the Earth to be the center of the universe. Aryabhata is often given credit for coming up with the number zero and using it as a placeholder.

==== Religion ====
- First Council of Orléans: Clovis I convenes a synod of Gallic bishops to reform the Church, and create a link between the Crown and the Catholic episcopate.
- Macedonius II is deposed as patriarch of Constantinople, and replaced by Timothy I.
- The convent of Saint-Césaire is built in Arles.

=== By place ===
==== Byzantine Empire ====
- Emperor Anastasius I ends a period of moderate eclectic policy, and starts strongly favoring his own monophysitist beliefs.
- Areobindus, Byzantine general, is proclaimed emperor during a riot at Constantinople but refuses to take part in the usurpation.
- Anastasius I constructs a wall from the Black Sea to the Sea of Marmara, to protect Constantinople from raiding Bulgars and Slavs.

==== Europe ====
- King Theodoric the Great grants citizens on Mount Vesuvius exemption from taxes, after a severe eruption in southeastern Italy.
- The Ostrogoths conquer the Frankish province Rouergue (Southern Gaul).

==== Asia ====
- The island nation of Usan-guk is conquered by the Silla dynasty (Korea), under general Kim Isabu.

=== By topic ===
==== Literature ====
- The first written text in the Arabic alphabet is recorded at Zabad (Syria).

=== By place ===
==== Europe ====
- Revolt of Vitalian: Byzantine general Vitalian revolts against Emperor Anastasius I, and conquers a large part of the Diocese of Thrace. He gains the support of the local people, and assembles an army of 50,000–60,000 men.
- Anastasius I reduces taxes in the provinces of Bithynia and Asia, to prevent them from joining the rebellion. Vitalian marches to Constantinople and encamps at the suburb of Hebdomon (modern Turkey).
- Anastasius I sends an embassy under the former consul Patricius to start negotiations. Vitalian declares his aims: restoration of Chalcedonian Orthodoxy and the settling of the Thracian foederati.
- Vitalian accepts an agreement and returns with his army to Lower Moesia. After a few inconclusive skirmishes, Anastasius I sends a Byzantine army (80,000 men) under his nephew Hypatius.
- Vitalian defeats the Byzantines at Acris (Bulgaria), on the Black Sea coast. He attacks their fortified Laager in darkness, and in a crushing defeat kills a large part of the imperial army.

==== Persia ====
- King Kavadh I adopts the doctrine of the Mazdakites, and breaks the influence of the magnates' (nobility).
- The Jewish community revolts at Ctesiphon against Mazdakism, and establishes an independent Jewish kingdom that lasts for seven years.

=== By topic ===
==== Religion ====
- Vigor becomes bishop of Bayeux. He opposes paganism and founds a monastery later known as Saint-Vigor-le-Grand (Normandy).

=== By place ===
==== Byzantine Empire ====
- Vitalian, Byzantine general, marches again to Constantinople. A fleet of 200 vessels sails from the Black Sea ports and blockades the entrance of the harbor capital. Emperor Anastasius I is disquieted by riots in the city, which cost many casualties, and decides to negotiate with Vitalian.
- Vitalian accepts the receipt of ransom money and gifts worth 5,000 pounds of gold for the release of Hypatius, a nephew of Anastasius I who has been a prisoner since the attack at Acris (see 513). Vitalian retreats to Lower Moesia.

==== Britannia ====
- Cissa of Sussex becomes king of the South Saxons after his father's death (approximate date).

==== Asia ====
- Beopheung becomes king of the Korean kingdom of Silla.

=== By topic ===
==== Religion ====
- July 19 – Pope Symmachus dies at Rome after a tenure of 15 years, 7 months and 27 days. He is succeeded by Hormisdas.

=== By place ===
==== Byzantine Empire ====
- Autumn – Revolt of Vitalian: Byzantine general (magister militum) Vitalian mobilises his army, and marches again towards Constantinople. He captures the suburb of Sycae (modern Turkey) across the Golden Horn, and encamps there.
- Emperor Anastasius I gives Marinus, former praetorian prefect of the East, command over the Byzantine army. He defeats the rebel fleet at the harbor entrance, using a sulfur-based chemical substance, similar to the later Greek fire.
- Marinus lands with an army on the shore of Sycae and defeats the rebels. Disheartened by the losses suffered, Vitalian flees north under cover of the night.
- As a sign of his victory, Anastasius I leads a procession to Sosthenion, and attends a service of thanks at the local church dedicated to the Archangel Michael.
- Empress Ariadne, wife of Emperor Anastasius I, dies at Constantinople and is buried in the Church of the Holy Apostles.

==== Europe ====
- Amalasuintha, daughter of king Theodoric the Great, marries Eutharic, an Ostrogoth noble of the old Amal line.

=== By topic ===
==== Religion ====
- The St. Maurice's Abbey (Switzerland) is founded by Sigismund of Burgundy. He sets up five groups of monks to whom he entrusts the liturgy of the praise of God.

=== By place ===
==== Europe ====
- Hygelac, king of the Geats (Sweden), raids the Lower Rhine, and is defeated by a Frankish force led by Theudebert (according to the "History of the Franks").
- King Gundobad of the Burgundians dies peacefully after a 43-year reign, and is succeeded by his eldest son Sigismund.

==== Great Britain ====
- Battle of Badon, British defeat of the Saxons, traditionally associated with King Arthur (traditional date)

==== Vietnam ====
- Emperor Wu appoints Lý Tắc, a Jiaozhou's state official, as the governor. Lý Tắc then suppresses the rebellion of Lý Tông Lão, a former subordinate of Lý Nguyên Khải, the previous governor of Jiaozhou, then beheads him to bring his head to Jiankang, as an offering to the emperor.

=== By topic ===
==== Religion ====
- November 6 – The Council of Tarragona (modern Spain) is held.

=== By place ===
==== Europe ====
- King Sigismund of Burgundy is opposed by his son Sigeric, and has him strangled. Overcome with remorse, he retreats to the monastery that he founded, St. Maurice's Abbey (modern Switzerland).

==== China ====
- Emperor Wu Di of the Liang Dynasty becomes a Buddhist, and introduces the new religion to central China. He demands that sacrifices to imperial ancestors be changed to using dried meat, instead of the traditional animals (goats, pigs and cows).

=== By topic ===
==== Religion ====
- Council of Epaone: Bishops of southern Gaul convene near Epao (present Anneyron) in Burgundy. The synod enacts the first legislation against wooden altars, forbidding the building of any but stone altars with chrism (a mixture of oil and spice).

==== Science ====
- Aryabhata compiles his manual of mathematics and astronomy (approximate date).

=== By place ===
==== Byzantine Empire ====
- July 9 – Emperor Anastasius I dies childless at Constantinople, age 88, after a 27-year reign in which he has abolished the sale of offices, reformed taxation, and perfected the empire's monetary system, but antagonized some with his heretical Monophysite religious policies. He is succeeded by Justin I (Flavius Justinus), his comes excubitorum, commander of the palace guard. After his death, he leaves the imperial treasury richer by 23,000,000 solidi or 320,000 pounds of gold.
- Justin I founds the Justinian dynasty and makes his nephew Flavius Petrus Sabbatius (later Justinian I) his trusted advisor. He becomes the emperor's close confidant and possibly acts as regent. Theocritus, candidate to the throne, is accused of a conspiracy and executed.

==== Balkans ====
- An earthquake destroys the city of Scupi (modern-day Skopje, North Macedonia), in what once was the Roman province of Moesia Superior.

==== Arabia ====
- Jabalah IV ibn al-Harith becomes the king of the Ghassanids. He invades Palestine, but is defeated by a Byzantine army under general (dux) Romanus.
- Approximate date – Jewish king Dhu Nuwas (also known as Yūsuf Asar Yathar) usurps the kingship of Himyar from Ma'dikarib Ya'fur.

=== By topic ===
==== Religion ====
- September 29 – Severus, patriarch of Antioch, is deposed by a synod for his Monophysitism. Paul the Jew is appointed to replace him.

=== By place ===
==== Britannia ====
- Cerdic becomes the first king of the Kingdom of Wessex.

==== Europe ====
- The synagogues of Ravenna are burnt down in a riot; Theodoric the Great orders them to be rebuilt at Ravenna's expense.
- August 28 – Theodoric's tricennium, a 30-year statute of limitations, after which unlawful seizures of land during his 489 invasion of Italy can no longer be contested, ends.

==== Asia ====
- Anjang becomes ruler of the Korean kingdom of Goguryeo.

=== By topic ===
==== Religion ====
- March 28 – The Eastern and Western churches reconcile their differences, ending the Acacian Schism.
- Jacob of Serugh becomes bishop of Batnan (near modern Diyarbakir, Turkey).
- The Memoirs of Eminent Monks is compiled.
- In Ireland, the Diocese of Kildare is erected.

== Births ==
510

- Aredius, abbot and saint (approximate date)
- Gildas, Celtic monk (approximate date)
- Xiao Ming Di, emperor of Northern Wei (d. 528)
- Xiao Wu Di, emperor of Northern Wei (d. 535)
- Yifu, empress of Western Wei (d. 540)

511

- Yang Yin, official of Northern Qi (d. 560)

512

- David, Welsh bishop and saint (approximate date)
- Eutychius, patriarch of Constantinople (approximate date)
- Maurus, Roman abbot and saint (d. 584)
- Wu Mingche, general of the Chen dynasty (d. 578)
- Lady Xian, Chinese general (d. 602)

513

- An Ding Wang, emperor of Northern Wei (d. 532)

515

- Approximate date – Cainnech of Aghaboe, Irish abbot and saint (d. 600)
- Hulü Guang, general of Northern Qi (d. 572)
- Yuwen Hu, regent of Northern Zhou (d. 572)

516

- Athalaric, king of the Ostrogoths (d. 534)
- Ciarán of Clonmacnoise, Irish bishop (d. 546)

517

- Charibert I, king of the Franks (approximate date)
- Ebrulf, Frankish hermit and abbot (d. 596)

518

- Gildas, British saint (approximate date)
- Matasuntha, queen of the Ostrogoths (approximate date)
- Mungo, Brythonic apostle and saint (approximate date)

519

- Xuan Di, emperor of the Liang Dynasty (d. 562)

== Deaths ==
510

- January 1 – Eugendus, abbot of Condat Abbey
- Drest II, king of the Picts (approximate date)
- Hashim, great-grandfather of Muhammad (approximate date)
- Tato, king of the Lombards (approximate date)

511

- November 27 – Clovis I, king of the Franks
- Gesalic, king of the Visigoths

512

- Areobindus, Byzantine general and politician
- Wang Baoming, empress of Southern Qi (b. 455)

513

- Gesalec, king of the Visigoths (approximate date)
- Shen Yue, Chinese historian and statesman (b. 441)

514

- July 19 – Pope Symmachus
- Aelle of Sussex, king of Sussex (approximate date)
- Jayavarman, king of Funan (Cambodia)
- Mac Nisse, bishop of Connor

515

- Ariadne, Byzantine empress
- Euphemius, patriarch of Constantinople
- Gao Zhao, high official of Northern Wei
- Xuan Wu Di, emperor of Northern Wei (b. 483)

516

- Gundobad, king of the Burgundians
- Hygelac, king of the Geats (approximate date)
- John, Coptic Orthodox patriarch of Alexandria
- Oisc, king of Kent (approximate date)

517

- April 5 – Timothy I, patriarch of Constantinople
- Dioscorus II, Coptic Orthodox patriarch of Alexandria
- Macedonius II, patriarch of Constantinople (approximate date)

518

- April 21 – Yu Zhong, official and regent of Northern Wei (b. 462)
- July 9 – Anastasius I Dicorus, Byzantine emperor
- July – Theocritus, Byzantine pretender (executed)
- November 14 – Gao, Chinese empress dowager of Northern Wei (murdered)
- Aeneas of Gaza, Neoplatonist and Christian philosopher (approximate date)
- Flavian II, banished patriarch of Antioch
- Moninne of Killeavy, one of Ireland's early women saints (approximate date)
- Tonantius Ferreolus, Gallo-Roman senator (approximate date)

519

- Munjamyeong of Goguryeo, 21st king of Goguryeo
