= Elder Lady Erzhu =

Chinese empress (514–556)

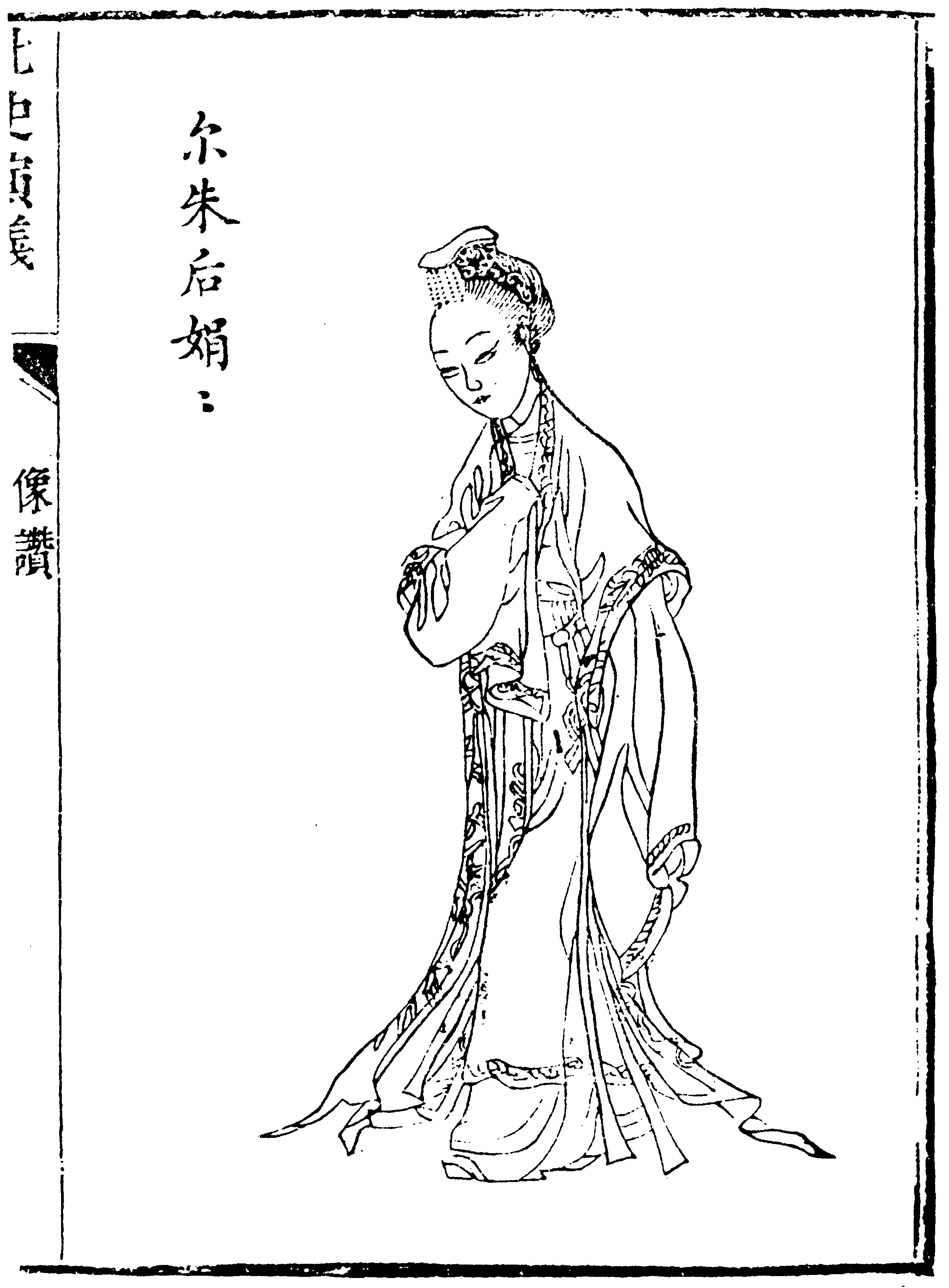
Empress Erzhu

Empress Erzhu (514–556) was an empress of the Xianbei-led Northern Wei dynasty of China. She was the wife of Emperor Xiaozhuang and a daughter of the paramount general Erzhu Rong. She later became a concubine of Northern Wei and Eastern Wei's paramount general and regent Gao Huan. In historical texts, she's often referred to by her final title of Princess Dowager of Pengcheng (彭城太妃). To distinguish her from Erzhu Zhao's daughter who married Yuan Ye, she's also referred to as Elder Lady Erzhu (大尔朱氏), while Yuan Ye's wife is referred to as Young Lady Erzhu (小尔朱氏).

== Background ==
Lady Erzhu's father Erzhu Rong had been a hereditary chief of the Qihu (契胡) tribe, a branch of the Xiongnu, located at Xiurong (秀容, in modern Shuozhou, Shanxi), and during the agrarian rebellions during Emperor Xiaoming's reign had become increasingly powerful as a military general. Sometime during Emperor Xiaoming's reign, she became Emperor Xiaoming's concubine with the rank of Pin (嬪). She was described to be capable as a soldier, and she was able to use the bow well.

In 528, Emperor Xiaoming, in a dispute with his mother Empress Dowager Hu over her overly favoring her lover Zheng Yan (鄭儼) and Zheng's associate Xu Ge (徐紇), conspired with Erzhu Rong to have him advance south toward the capital Luoyang to force Empress Dowager Hu to remove Zheng and Xu. When Empress Dowager Hu discovered this, she poisoned Emperor Xiaoming to death. Erzhu Rong refused to recognize the young emperor Yuan Zhao that she put on the throne, instead advancing on Luoyang, capturing it and throwing Empress Dowager Hu and Yuan Zhao into the Yellow River to drown. He also slaughtered a large number of imperial officials and made Emperor Xiaoming's father Emperor Xuanwu's cousin Yuan Ziyou emperor (as Emperor Xiaozhuang).

== As empress ==
Erzhu Rong was in control of the military at this point, although Emperor Xiaozhuang retained substantial political powers, and Erzhu Rong wanted Emperor Xiaozhuang to marry Lady Erzhu as empress to cement the relationship. Emperor Xiaozhuang initially hesitated, as pursuant to Confucian regulations he would be committing incest if he did. However, the official Zu Ying (祖瑩) convinced him that the union would be advantageous, and so he agreed. Empress Erzhu was described to be jealous and did not tolerate Emperor Xiaozhuang's other consorts. Emperor Xiaozhuang once asked her father's cousin Erzhu Shilong to persuade her to be less jealous. Instead, she told Erzhu Shilong that Emperor Xiaozhuang depended on the Erzhus for his throne and that things could still change; Erzhu Shilong agreed with her.

Worried about the hold that Erzhu Rong had on the military and how he had been willing to slaughter imperial officials (including Emperor Xiaozhuang's own brothers Yuan Shao (元劭) and Yuan Zizheng (元子正)), Emperor Xiaozhuang, during Empress Erzhu's pregnancy in 530, tricked him into entering the palace with his close associate Yuan Tianmu the Prince of Shangdang and his eldest son Erzhu Puti (爾朱菩提) and killing them by falsely telling them that Empress Erzhu had given birth. This precipitated a war between the imperial forces and the Erzhus' forces, which lasted for two months, during which Empress Erzhu gave birth to a son. Eventually, the Erzhu forces, under the command of Empress Erzhu's cousin Erzhu Zhao, captured Luoyang and deposed (and later killed) Emperor Xiaozhuang, making his distant relative Yuan Ye the Prince of Changguang, and then later his cousin Yuan Gong the Prince of Guangling emperor. Erzhu Zhao also put Emperor Xiaozhuang's and Empress Erzhu's infant son to death.

== As Gao Huan's concubine ==
The Erzhus controlled the empire for a while, but in 531, the general Gao Huan, a former subordinate of Erzhu Rong's, rose against them, and by 532 Gao had defeated the Erzhus, becoming the paramount general for Northern Wei, and for the branch state Eastern Wei after Northern Wei's division into Eastern Wei and Western Wei in 534. Shortly after Gao's defeating of the Erzhus, she became a concubine of Gao's. She and another consort that Gao took, the Princess Ruru (Note: a princess of Rouran), were renowned for their military demonstrations, and Gao once commented that these two concubines of his were capable of defeating bandits. In 535, when Gao Huan was angry with his son Gao Cheng for having had an affair with Gao Huan's concubine Lady Zheng, he considered replacing his wife Lou Zhaojun, Gao Cheng's mother, with Lady Erzhu, but ultimately did not do so. Lady Erzhu bore him two sons, Gao You (高浟) (Note: later the Prince of Pengcheng) in 533 and Gao Ning (高凝). (Note: later the Prince of Huashan) In spring 545, Lady Erzhu's brother Erzhu Wenchang (爾朱文暢) and Zheng Zhongli (鄭仲禮), the brother of Gao Huan's other favorite concubine Zheng Dache (鄭大車), along with Ren Zhou (任冑), conspired to assassinate Gao Huan and support Erzhu Wenchang as leader, but the conspiracy was discovered, and the conspirators were put to death, along with their families. However, because of Gao Huan's favors for Lady Erzhu and Zheng Dache, he spared their brothers. However, she later became a Buddhist nun, even while Gao Huan was still alive, for reasons lost to history; Gao Huan built a temple for her.

== After Gao Huan's death ==
After Gao Huan's death in 547 and his son Gao Yang's abolition of Eastern Wei and establishment of Northern Qi as its Emperor Wenxuan, Lady Erzhu carried the title of Princess Dowager of Pengcheng. In 556, Emperor Wenxuan, while drunk, wanted to have sexual relations with her, and she refused. He killed her by his own hand.

== Notes ==
Chinese royalty
Preceded by Empress Hu	Empress of Northern Wei; 528–530	Succeeded by Young Lady Erzhu
