= 518 =

Calendar year

518 in various calendars
- Gregorian calendar: 518; DXVIII
- Ab urbe condita: 1271
- Assyrian calendar: 5268
- Balinese saka calendar: 439–440
- Bengali calendar: −76 – −75
- Berber calendar: 1468
- Buddhist calendar: 1062
- Burmese calendar: −120
- Byzantine calendar: 6026–6027
- Chinese calendar: 丁酉年 (Fire Rooster); 3215 or 3008 — to — 戊戌年 (Earth Dog); 3216 or 3009
- Coptic calendar: 234–235
- Discordian calendar: 1684
- Ethiopian calendar: 510–511
- Hebrew calendar: 4278–4279
- Hindu calendars
- Vikram Samvat: 574–575
- Shaka Samvat: 439–440
- Kali Yuga: 3618–3619
- Holocene calendar: 10518
- Iranian calendar: 104 BP – 103 BP
- Islamic calendar: 107 BH – 106 BH
- Javanese calendar: 405–406
- Julian calendar: 518; DXVIII
- Korean calendar: 2851
- Minguo calendar: 1394 before ROC 民前1394年
- Nanakshahi calendar: −950
- Seleucid era: 829/830 AG
- Thai solar calendar: 1060–1061
- Tibetan calendar: མེ་མོ་བྱ་ལོ་ (female Fire-Bird); 644 or 263 or −509 — to — ས་ཕོ་ཁྱི་ལོ་ (male Earth-Dog); 645 or 264 or −508

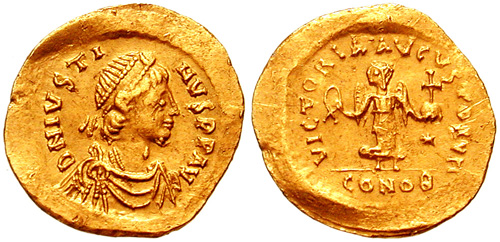
Emperor Justin I (518–527)

Year 518 (DXVIII) was a common year starting on Monday of the Julian calendar. At the time, it was known as the Year of the Consulship of Paulus without colleague (or, less frequently, year 1271 Ab urbe condita). The denomination 518 for this year has been used since the early medieval period, when the Anno Domini calendar era became the prevalent method in Europe for naming years.

== Events ==
=== By place ===
==== Byzantine Empire ====
- July 9 – Emperor Anastasius I dies childless at Constantinople, age 88, after a 27-year reign in which he has abolished the sale of offices, reformed taxation, and perfected the empire's monetary system, but antagonized some with his heretical Monophysite religious policies. He is succeeded by Justin I (Flavius Justinus), his comes excubitorum, commander of the palace guard. After his death, he leaves the imperial treasury richer by 23,000,000 solidi or 320,000 pounds of gold.
- Justin I founds the Justinian dynasty and makes his nephew Flavius Petrus Sabbatius (later Justinian I) his trusted advisor. He becomes the emperor's close confidant and possibly acts as regent. Theocritus, candidate to the throne, is accused of a conspiracy and executed.

==== Balkans ====
- An earthquake destroys the city of Scupi (modern-day Skopje, North Macedonia), in what once was the Roman province of Moesia Superior.

==== Arabia ====
- Jabalah IV ibn al-Harith becomes the king of the Ghassanids. He invades Palestine, but is defeated by a Byzantine army under general (dux) Romanus.
- Approximate date – Jewish king Dhu Nuwas (also known as Yūsuf Asar Yathar) usurps the kingship of Himyar from Ma'dikarib Ya'fur.

=== By topic ===
==== Religion ====
- September 29 – Severus, patriarch of Antioch, is deposed by a synod for his Monophysitism. Paul the Jew is appointed to replace him.

== Births ==
- Gildas, British saint (approximate date)
- Matasuntha, queen of the Ostrogoths (approximate date)
- Mungo, Brythonic apostle and saint (approximate date)

== Deaths ==
- April 21 – Yu Zhong, official and regent of Northern Wei (b. 462)
- July 9 – Anastasius I Dicorus, Byzantine emperor
- July – Theocritus, Byzantine pretender (executed)
- November 14 – Gao, Chinese empress dowager of Northern Wei (murdered)
- Aeneas of Gaza, Neoplatonist and Christian philosopher (approximate date)
- Flavian II, banished patriarch of Antioch
- Moninne of Killeavy, one of Ireland's early women saints (approximate date)
- Tonantius Ferreolus, Gallo-Roman senator (approximate date)
