= Daughter of Emperor Xiaoming of Northern Wei =

6th-century Empress in China

Empress Yuan 女帝元氏

Emperor of Northern Wei (disputed)
- Reign: 1 April 528
- Predecessor: Emperor Xiaoming
- Successor: Yuan Zhao
- Born: 12 February 528; Luoyang, Northern Wei (present-day Luoyang, Henan, China)
- Died: after 1 April 528
Names
- Family name: Yuan (元); Given name: Unknown
Era name and dates
- Wutai (武泰): 1st month – 4th month, 528 (Note: This was the last era name of Emperor Xiaoming of Northern Wei. After his death, it remained in use during the short reigns of his daughter and Yuan Zhao.) (Chinese calendar); February – June, 528 (Gregorian calendar)
- House: Yuan
- Dynasty: Northern Wei
- Father: Emperor Xiaoming
- Mother: Pan Wailian (Note: Consort Pan's name being "Wailian" is from History of the Northern Dynasties. Consort Pan was mentioned in Yuan Cha's biography in Bei Shi as having convinced Emperor Xiaoming that Yuan Cha would either harm her or the emperor. Yuan Cha was then stripped of the rest of his posts and demoted to commoner status. Yuan Cha's biography in Wei Shu did not indicate that Consort Pan had any role in Yuan Cha being demoted to commoner status, while Zizhi Tongjian's record of the incident (in volume 150) only indicated Consort Pan's surname.)

Empress Yuan (12 February 528 (Note: According to Emperor Xiaoming's biography in Book of Wei, Lady Yuan was born on the yichou day of the 1st month of the 1st year of the Wutai era of his reign. This corresponds to 12 Feb 528 on the Julian calendar.) – after 1 April 528), personal name unknown, was briefly an emperor of the Xianbei-led Chinese Northern Wei dynasty. She bore the surname Yuan (Chinese: 元; pinyin: Yuán), originally Tuoba. (Note: The surname of the Northern Wei ruling family was changed from Tuoba to Yuan by the Emperor Xiaowen (r. 471–499).) Yuan was the only child of Emperor Xiaoming (r. 515–528), born to his concubine Consort Pan. Soon after her birth, her grandmother the Empress Dowager Hu, who was also Xiaoming's regent, falsely declared that she was a boy and ordered a general pardon. Emperor Xiaoming died soon afterwards. On 1 April 528, Empress Dowager Hu installed the infant on the throne for a matter of hours before replacing her with Yuan Zhao the next day. Emperor Xiaoming's daughter was not recognised as a legitimate emperor (huangdi) by later generations. No further information about her or her mother is available.

== Birth ==
Empress Dowager Hu (d. 528), known posthumously as Empress Dowager Ling, was originally one of Emperor Xuanwu's (483–515, r. 499–515) consorts; she gave birth to his only living heir Yuan Xu (510–528). Following Xuanwu's death, Yuan Xu ascended the throne as Emperor Xiaoming, and Hu was honoured as Consort Dowager, and soon Empress Dowager. Because Emperor Xiaoming was still young, she became his regent. To exert her power as the highest ruler of Northern Wei, she addressed herself as Zhen (Chinese: 朕; pinyin: Zhèn), a first-person pronoun reserved for use by the emperor after the Qin dynasty. Officials addressed her as Bixia (Chinese: 陛下; pinyin: Bìxià), an honorific used when addressing the emperor directly.

When Emperor Xiaoming grew up, however, his mother refused to hand authority over to him. She successfully eliminated many of her opponents, including favourites of the emperor. The ancient Chinese historians who wrote the official history of the Northern Wei portrayed her as promiscuous. Both her lifestyle and her ruling style elicited widespread dissatisfaction among officials and from her son. Emperor Xiaoming gathered the people to oppose her and executed her lover Yuan Yi (元怿) in 520, causing deep hatred from his mother. After several failed attempts to overthrow the empress dowager, Xiaoming secretly ordered General Erzhu Rong to send troops to the capital Luoyang to coerce her into handing over the authority. When she learned about the plot, she discussed strategies with the officials who supported her.

As these events were occurring, on 12 February 528, Consort Pan, one of Emperor Xiaoming's nine concubines, gave birth to a daughter. Empress Dowager Hu falsely declared that the child was a son; she issued an edict the following day, ordering a general pardon and changing the emperor's reign title from Xiaochang (孝昌) to Wutai (武泰).

== Accession and dethronement ==
On 31 March 528, Emperor Xiaoming suddenly died in Xianyang Palace (顯陽殿). The following day (1 April 528), Empress Dowager Hu declared the 50-day-old baby girl Yuan the new emperor, while she herself continued to be regent. She ordered another general pardon. As the year of Emperor Xiaoming's reign had not ended, the era name was not changed and the name "Wutai" remained in use. Empress Dowager Hu continued to be effectively in power.

Within 1 April 528, Empress Dowager Hu issued an edict to dethrone the infant Emperor and declared that Wutai was a girl. She placed Yuan Zhao—son of the deceased Yuan Baohui (元寶暉), Prince of Lintao—on the throne instead. Yuan Zhao ascended the throne on 2 April 528, the day after Empress Dowager Hu issued the edict.

As he was too young to rule, Yuan Zhao was made a puppet emperor under Empress Dowager Hu. The series of events involving her son's death and the installation of the infant girl and the three-year-old Yuan Zhao on the throne occurred to ensure the continuation of her regency.

== Outcome ==
Because Empress Dowager Hu replaced the emperor in an unbridled manner, General Erzhu Rong sent in troops to overthrow her, stating that she had deceived Heaven as well as the Imperial Court by letting the infant girl succeed to the throne. Erzhu Rong made Yuan Ziyou (507–531) emperor. Not long after, Erzhu Rong sent troops to occupy the capital Luoyang, and Empress Dowager Hu and Yuan Zhao were held captive. They were delivered to his camp at Heyin (河陰). Empress Dowager Hu begged him for mercy, but he refused and had her and Yuan Zhao drowned in the Yellow River. Erzhu later killed thousands of Han Chinese officials and their families who had served at the Northern Wei court during her regency. This massacre is known as the Heyin Incident (河陰之變). Erzhu Rong became the highest authority of the empire. From that time on, political power fell into the hands of powerful ministers and warlords. Gao Huan and Yuwen Tai were generals during the Erzhu Rong era who respectively controlled Eastern Wei and Western Wei following the split of the dynasty, while Erzhu controlled the northern part of the empire. This division eventually led to the downfall of the dynasty.

For the acts she committed during her regency, Empress Dowager Hu was discredited and became infamous in history for causing the downfall of the dynasty.

== Controversy ==
Wutai's status as an emperor (huangdi) remains controversial and is not recognised by many. Official historical records have never listed her as a legitimate sovereign because she was a puppet under Empress Dowager Hu and reigned for less than a day. She was also an impostor for the throne as a boy. Hence, Wu Zetian remains as the first and only recognised female huangdi in Chinese history. Researcher Cheng Yang (成扬) believes that the fact that Yuan was the "first female in history to ascend the imperial throne" cannot be denied despite it being a plot by Empress Dowager Hu. According to Cheng, Wu Zetian was not the only female huangdi, but the only one to have reigned over the empire. Luo Yuanzhen (罗元贞), another researcher on Wu, thinks that modern historians should not acknowledge Wutai's title as Huangdi as ancient Chinese historians did not.

== In fiction and popular culture ==
Yuan briefly appeared in Chapter 47—Xiao Baoyin's rebellion and capture by Erzhu Rong (Chinese: 蕭寶夤稱尊叛命 爾朱榮抗表興師) of the Romance of the Northern and Southern Dynasties (Chinese: 南北史演義) of Republic of China novelist Cai Dongfan's Popular Romance of Dynasties (Chinese: 歷朝通俗演義); the story largely conforms with the historical account.

== See also ==
- Chen Shuozhen, another female monarch of China not widely recognised by future generations
- List of shortest-reigning monarchs

== Explanatory notes ==
Regnal titles
Preceded by Emperor Xiaoming of Northern Wei	Emperor of Northern Wei; 528	Succeeded by Yuan Zhao
