= Yuan Yong =

Chinese imperial prince (died 528)

Yuan Yong (元雍) (died May 17, 528), né Tuoba Yong (拓跋雍), courtesy name Simu (思穆), formally Prince Wenmu of Gaoyang (高陽文穆王), was an imperial prince of the Xianbei-led Chinese Northern Wei dynasty. He was very powerful during the reign of his grandnephew Emperor Xiaoming, and by corrupt means grew very rich. This, however, drew resentment from the populace, and after Emperor Xiaoming's death in 528 and the subsequent overthrowing of Emperor Xiaoming's mother Empress Dowager Hu by the general Erzhu Rong, Erzhu had him and over 2,000 other officials slaughtered at Heyin (河陰, in modern Luoyang, Henan).

== Background ==
It is not known when Tuoba Yong was born; what is known is that he was the sixth of seven sons of Emperor Xianwen, and that his mother was Emperor Xianwen's concubine Consort Han, who was also the mother of one of his older brothers, Tuoba Gan (拓跋幹). Emperor Xianwen yielded the throne to Tuoba Yong's oldest brother, Emperor Xiaowen, in 471, and died subsequently in 476, probably murdered by Tuoba Yong's stepgrandmother, Empress Dowager Feng, who then proceeded to assume regency over Emperor Xiaowen. Emperor Xiaowen liked Tuoba Yong for his lack of inhibitions, and while Yuan Yong did not display much talent while young, he believed that Yuan Yong might show those talents later. In 485, Tuoba Yong was created the Prince of Yingchuan. In 494, when Emperor Xiaowen moved the capital from Pingcheng (平城, in modern Datong, Shanxi), Tuoba Yong's title was changed to the Prince of Gaoyang. In 496, when Emperor Xiaowen changed the name of the imperial clan from Tuoba to Yuan, Tuoba Yong's name was changed to Yuan Yong. Subsequently, when Emperor Xiaowen conducted his campaigns against rival Southern Qi, Yuan Yong was put in charge of the important Xiang Province (相州), but he, unlike most of his other brothers, was not given any greater authority during Emperor Xiaowen's reign.

== During Emperor Xuanwu's reign ==
Yuan Yong was honored, but not particularly powerful, after Emperor Xiaowen's death in 499 and succession by his oldest son Emperor Xuanwu, unlike his brothers Yuan Xi (元禧) the Prince of Xianyang, Yuan Xie the Prince of Pengcheng, and Yuan Xiang (元詳) the Prince of Beihai, each of whom received substantial powers. After Yuan Yong served a further stint as the governor of Ji Province (冀州, modern central Hebei), Emperor Xuanwu recalled him to the capital. He participated in Yuan Xiang's corruption trial in 504. Whenever Emperor Xuanwu visited Yuan Yong's mansion, Emperor Xuanwu would pay proper respect to him as an uncle, rather than allowing Yuan Yong to bow to him as a subject to an emperor.

== During Emperor Xiaoming's reign ==
Emperor Xuanwu died suddenly in 515. The officials Yu Zhong and Cui Guang (崔光) quickly proclaimed Emperor Xuanwu's young crown prince Yuan Xu emperor (as Emperor Xiaoming) and seized power away from Emperor Xuanwu's wife Empress Gao, whose uncle Gao Zhao, who was also Emperor Xuanwu's uncle, was extremely powerful. In order to counteract Gao Zhao, Yu and Cui forced Empress Gao to yield regent powers to Yuan Yong and Emperor Xiaowen's cousin Yuan Cheng (元澄) the Prince of Rencheng, and then, Yu and Yuan Yong ambushed Gao Zhao and killed him. Empress Gao was also removed and replaced as empress dowager by Emperor Xiaoming's mother Consort Hu.

Although Yuan Yong and Yuan Cheng were titular regents, real regency powers were in Yu's hands, and Yu quickly grew exceedingly arrogant and autocratic. The officials Pei Zhi (裴植) and Guo Zuo (郭祚) secretly suggested to Yuan Yong to have Yu's power stripped. When Yu found out about this, he falsely accused Pei and Guo of crimes, and they were put to death. Yu also wanted to kill Yuan Yong, but Cui resisted, so Yuan Yong was only removed from his posts. Later in 515, however, Empress Dowager Hu assumed regency powers and quickly stripped Yu of most of his posts, making Yu the governor of Ji Province. As soon as Yu left the capital, most of his acts were reversed, and Yuan Yong accused him of crimes and asked that he be punished. However, Empress Dowager Hu, because Yu had saved her life before, refused to act against Yu, although she recalled Yuan Yong back to the administration to serve in high capacity.

During Empress Dowager Hu's regency, she tolerated officials' corruption and wealth-gathering, and often added to the wealth-gathering herself by awarding them money and luxuries out of the imperial treasury. Yuan Yong became exceedingly rich at this time, and historians described his wealth as being so great as like a nation's treasury, and he had 6,000 male servants and 500 female servants. While two other princes, Yuan Chen (元琛) the Prince of Hejian and Yuan Rong (元融) the Prince of Zhangwu tried to compete with him, they could not, and it was commonly recognized that Yuan Yong was the richest official at the time. This type of corruption among high-level officials had a corrosive effect on Northern Wei's rule, and it was about this time that there began to be large-scale agrarian revolts throughout the empire.

In 520, Empress Dowager Hu's brother-in-law, the general Yuan Cha, along with the eunuch Liu Teng (劉騰) and the palace attendant Hou Gang (侯剛), carried out a coup against her, putting her under house arrest. Yuan Cha, however, was respectful of Yuan Yong, and he remained in a position of power, although Yuan Cha was effectively the regent. In 525, Yuan Yong plotted with both Empress Dowager Hu and Emperor Xiaoming to restore Empress Dowager Hu, and later that year she seized power back from Yuan Cha and forced Yuan Cha to commit suicide. Yuan Yong, as one who participated in her plan, continued in his position of power.

== Death ==
In 528, with Empress Dowager Hu and Emperor Xiaoming in a conflict after Emperor Xiaoming wanted to put Empress Dowager Hu's lover Zheng Yan (鄭儼) to death by conspiring with the general Erzhu Rong, Empress Dowager Hu poisoned Emperor Xiaoming and put the young child Yuan Zhao, a great-grandson of Emperor Xiaowen from a collateral line, on the throne. Erzhu refused to recognize Yuan Zhao's imperial authority and advanced on Luoyang, quickly capturing it. He made Yuan Xie's son Yuan Ziyou emperor (as Emperor Xiaozhuang) and threw Empress Dowager Hu and Yuan Zhao into the Yellow River to drown.

Erzhu then believed that, in order to show his might, he needed to massacre the high-level officials, whom the people viewed as corrupt. Under the guise that they were needed to attend Emperor Xiaozhuang in sacrificing to heaven, he had them, led by Yuan Yong, report to Heyin, near Luoyang. Then, he had his cavalry surround them and massacre them. Erzhu would later regret this action, and he had Yuan Yong and the other officials killed buried with honor.

== Family ==
- Lady, of the Lu clan of Fanyang (范陽盧氏)
- Lady, of the Cui clan of Boling (博陵崔氏), personal name Xianmei (显妹)
  - Yuan Tai, Prince of Wenxiao (文孝王 元泰; 504 – 17 May 528), 2nd son
- Meiren, of the Xu clan (美人 徐氏), personal name Yuehua (月华)
- Unknown
  - Yuan Duan, Duke of Sikong (司空公 元端; 493 – 17 May 528), 1st son
  - Yuan Rui, Prince of Jibei (元睿 济北郡王; d. 17 May 528), 3rd son son
  - Yuan Dan, Prince of Gaoyang (元诞 高阳王; d. 536), 4th son
  - Yuan Leicha, Prince of Gaoyang (元勒叉 高阳王), 5th son
  - Yuan Gen, Duke of Puyang (元亘 濮阳县公), 6th son
  - Yuan Futuo, Duke of Wuyang (元伏陀武阳县公), 7th son
  - Yuan Mituo, Duke of Xinyang (元弥陀新阳县公), 8th son
  - Yuwen Sengyu, Duke of Dunqiu (元僧育 顿丘县公), 9th son
  - Yuan Juluo (元居罗), 10th son
  - Lady Yuan (元氏), 1st daughter
    - Married Huangfu Yan (皇甫玚)
  - Lady Yuan (元氏), 2nd daughter
    - Cui Zhongwen (崔仲文) of the Cui clan of Qinghe
  - Lady Yuan (元氏), 3rd daughter
    - Zheng Youru (郑幼儒) of the Zheng clan of Xingyang
