= Empress Xiaoming =

Empress Xiaoming (Chinese: 孝明皇后) may refer to:

- Empress Dowager Zheng (died 865), empress dowager of the Tang dynasty
- Empress Wang (Taizu) (942–963), empress of the Song dynasty

== See also ==
- Empress Hu (Yuan Xu's wife) (fl. 6th century), married to Yuan Xu (Emperor Xiaoming of Northern Wei)
