= Arddun Penasgell =

Queen of Powys

Arddun Penasgell or Benasgell (b. 510s, Hen Ogledd) was a Brittonic princess and a queen of Powys in the 6th century.

== Life ==
The exact origin of her nickname, Penasgell (Brittonic : Winged Head), rarely used in Medieval texts, is unknown. It could refer to her hair. Assuming that the word asgell should be replaced by askol (thistle), this epithet would make more sense and might refer to particularly dishevelled hair.

Arddun Penasgell was the presumed daughter of King Pabo Post Prydain and sister to Sawyl Penuchel (Sawyl the Arrogant). She was born in the 510s in the central part of Hen Ogledd. According to tradition, her father having list his estates to the Angles, her family retreated into Wales, looking for a matrimonial alliance. As a result, she married the king of Powys Brochfael Ysgithrog (Long-teeth) by whom she had several children, among whom Saint Tysilio and Brochfael's successor Cynan Garwyn.

In spite of the lack of information about her, legend says that she took holy orders at the end of her life and became a saint. Although a parish in Gwynedd is named after her, there is no evidence of her religious role.

== In the Welsh Triads ==
She is mentioned in the Welsh Triads Peniarth MS 47 as the sister of Peredur and Gwrgi mab Eliffer. The triads being contradictory, her position is rather delicate.

80. — (Myv., 392, 52). Three Fair Womb-Burdens in the Island of Prydain: Uryen and Eurddyl, children of Kynvarch Hen, who were together in the womb of Nevyn, daughter of Brychan, their mother; Owain, son of Uryen, and Morvud, his sister, together in the womb of Modron, daughter of Avallach; Gwrgi, Peredur and Keindrech Pen Ascell, children of Eliffer Gosgorddvawr, in the womb of Eurddyl, daughter of Kynvarch, their mother.

Peniarth MS 50 calls the third sibling Ceindrech Pen Ascell whereas other texts call Ceindrech the daughter of King Brychan Brycheiniog and state that Arddun, not Ceindrech, was nicnamed Penasgell and was the daughter of Eliffer. These discrepancies make it impossible to clearly identify who this woman was, although it is possible that there were several women named Arrdun or the Triads were ill-interpreted, causing more confusion.
