= Gao Zhao =

Chinese official (died 515)

Gao Zhao (高肇) (before 469 - 515), courtesy name Shouwen (首文), was a high-ranking official of the Xianbei-led Northern Wei dynasty of China. He was a maternal uncle of Emperor Xuanwu, and he became increasingly powerful during Emperor Xuanwu's reign, drawing anger from other high-level officials not only for his powerplay (including involvement in the death of the highly regarded imperial prince Yuan Xie) and corruption, but also because he was a mere commoner before Emperor Xuanwu's reign, not from the aristocracy and might have been Korean in origin. After Emperor Xuanwu died in 515, the other officials set a trap for Gao Zhao and had him killed.

== Background ==
Gao Zhao claimed that his ancestors were from Bohai Commandery (勃海, roughly Cangzhou, Hebei), and that his fifth generation ancestor Gao Gu (高顧), in order to flee the wars during the times of Emperor Huai of Jin, fled to the Korean Peninsula. Gao Zhao's father Gao Yang (高颺) defected to Northern Wei during the early reign of Emperor Xiaowen and was given a minor general title and created the Viscount of Hejian. Emperor Xiaowen also took Gao Yang's daughter as an imperial consort, and she gave birth to his second son, Yuan Ke in 483. Yuan Ke was initially not crown prince, but became crown prince in 497 after his only older brother Yuan Xun was deposed from that position in 496; his mother Consort Gao, whom Emperor Xiaowen initially left in the old capital Pingcheng (平城, in modern Datong, Shanxi) and did not bring to the new capital Luoyang when he moved the capital in 494, was welcomed to the new capital, but on the way, she died suddenly. (Note: Historians largely believe that Emperor Xiaowen's wife Empress Feng Run, who wanted to raise Yuan Ke on her own, murdered Consort Gao.) Gao Zhao and his brothers never had any actual contact with Yuan Ke during his youth. Despite the fact that Gao Yang did have a minor noble title, it appeared that his family was essentially treated as commoners and regarded as uncultured.

== Rise to power ==
In 499, Emperor Xiaowen died, and Yuan Ke succeeded him (as Emperor Xuanwu). Emperor Xuanwu posthumously honored his mother Consort Kao as Empress Wenzhao and his grandfather Gao Yang as Duke of Bohai. He summoned Gao Yang's oldest grandson Gao Meng (高猛) and his uncles Gao Zhao and Gao Xian (高顯) and, at their first meeting, immediately named them dukes—in Gao Zhao's case, the Duke of Pingyuan. Emperor Xuanwu awarded the three of them large amounts of property.

Gao Zhao was not only given a noble title, but starting from 499 he became increasingly important on the political scene as well. He was initially looked down upon by the nobility because he came from the Korean Peninsula, and, despite his claims of Han ancestry, was considered to be a dishonorable barbarian, but as his power grew, he was praised for his diligence in handling the matters he was in charge of. His power began to grow greatly in 501, when Emperor Xuanwu, aged 15, relieved his princely uncles Yuan Xi (元禧) the Prince of Xianyang and Yuan Xie the Prince of Pengcheng of their high level posts, and ostensibly took over power himself—but being unable to actually handle all important matters of state due to his age, and thus entrusting much of those affairs to Gao and other close associates. Later that year, Yuan Xi was forced to commit suicide when his plot to secede with the southern half of the empire was discovered, and his property was seized and awarded to Gao and the trusted associate Zhao Xiu (趙修), and from this point on Emperor Xuanwu became increasingly suspicious of members of the imperial clan, making his reliance on Gao even greater.

In 502, both Gao and the official Zhang Yi (張彝) wanted to marry Emperor Xuanwu's aunt, the Princess Chenliu. The princess decided to marry Zhang and not Gao, and this caused Gao to be angry. He falsely accused Zhang of crimes, and Zhang was relieved from his post.

in 503, Emperor Xuanwu took the daughter of Gao Zhao's brother Gao Yan (高偃) as a concubine and favored her greatly, further cementing Gao Zhao's power. By that point, Gao was in a power struggle with Zhao, who was believed to be corrupt and extravagant in his living. He induced Zhao's associates Zhen Chen (甄琛), Li Ping (李憑), and Wang Xian (王顯) to accuse Zhao of crimes and torture him, and Zhao died shortly thereafter. From this point on, Gao's hold on the emperor was unchallenged.

== Increasing power ==
In 504, Emperor Xuanwu's uncle Yuan Xiang (元詳) the Prince of Beihai, who was then prime minister, grew increasingly arrogant and corrupt. Yuan Xiang had an affair with a cousin of Gao Zhao, who was the wife of Yuan Xie (元燮, not the same person as the Prince of Pengcheng) the Prince of Anding, and through her Gao apparently became aware of Yuan Xiang's crimes, and so he used the evidence of those crimes to further accuse Yuan Xiang of plotting treason. Emperor Xuanwu stripped Yuan Xiang of his title and posts, and Yuan Xiang soon thereafter died, and his associates were executed. Gao further suggested Emperor Xuanwu to put the imperial princes under heavy guard, and, despite opposition from Yuan Xie the Prince of Pengcheng, Emperor Xuanwu agreed, effectively putting those princes under house arrest.

In 507, Gao's power was so well known that after the famed music director Gongsun Chong (公孫崇) spent three years trying to get his revisions to imperial musical numbers adopted officially but was unable to, he had a solution—asking Gao to be in charge of the project, despite Gao's lack of musical knowledge. Emperor Xuanwu approved of the appointment, allowing Gongsun's project to proceed.

Later that year, Emperor Xuanwu's wife Empress Yu died, and in early 508 her son (and Emperor Xuanwu's only son by that point) Yuan Chang (元昌) died as well. It was believed, although unproven, that both Empress Yu and Yuan Chang were murdered by Gao Zhao and Consort Gao.

In 508, Emperor Xuanwu created Consort Gao empress, despite opposition by Yuan Xie the Prince of Pengcheng. Gao Zhao thereafter became resentful of Yuan Xie. When Emperor Xuanwu's brother Yuan Yu (元愉) the Prince of Jingzhao rebelled that year after believing that Gao was falsely accusing him, Gao in turn falsely accused Yuan Xie of working both in concert with Yuan Yu and rival Liang dynasty. Emperor Xuanwu believed this, and secretly forced Yuan Xie to commit suicide during an imperial gathering. The populace quickly came to believe that Gao was involved in the death of the highly popular Yuan Xie, and from that point on Gao became even more despised by the people and nobles alike. Apparently apprehensive about this resentment, when Gao Zhao's son Gao Zhi (高植) made contributions in subsequently defeating Yuan Yu, Gao Zhi declined all awards offered him.

In 512, Gao Zhao was made prime minister, but was displeased because at the same time he was relieved of a lower post that allowed him to meet with the emperor daily. This display of displeasure became the topic of ridicule among officials. That year, because of a drought, Gao advocated the review of all criminal cases to see if unfair treatment had displeased the gods, and Emperor Xuanwu's brother Yuan Yi (元懌) the Prince of Qinghe accused Gao of overstepping his authorities. Emperor Xuanwu, while not punishing Yuan Yi for the accusation, also took no actions against Gao.

== Death ==
In the winter of 515, Emperor Xuanwu wanted to try to capture rival Liang's Yi Province (modern Sichuan and Chongqing), and he commissioned Gao Zhao as the commander of the expedition force. Soon after Gao Zhao left the capital Luoyang, however, Emperor Xuanwu died of a sudden illness in spring 515. Emperor Xuanwu's crown prince Yuan Xu (元詡), then age five, succeeded him (as Emperor Xiaoming). In the confusion of the events, Empress Gao tried to have Emperor Xiaoming's mother Consort Hu killed, but could not. Meanwhile, the official Yu Zhong and the imperial princes (Emperor Xuanwu's uncles) Yuan Cheng (元澄) the Prince of Rencheng and Yuan Yong the Prince of Gaoyang seized power, forcing Empress Gao, who was honored as empress dowager, to appoint Yuan Cheng and Yuan Yong as regents.

The princely regents then wrote Gao Zhao a humble letter, in Emperor Xiaoming's name, summoning Gao back to the capital. When Gao heard of Emperor Xuanwu's death and realized that the princes were in power, he became fearful and mournful, and his body became weak. When he arrived in Luoyang's vicinity, his family members arrived to greet him, but he refused to see them. When he then entered the palace to mourn Emperor Xuanwu, the princes and Yu seized him and had him strangled. Emperor Xiaoming then issued an edict in which it was claimed that Gao had committed suicide, and the edict stripped him of his posts and title, but was buried with honors due a scholar. Subsequently, Empress Dowager Gao was deposed and replaced with Consort Hu, and the Gao clan lost its power.
