= Emperor Xiaoming of Northern Wei =

Emperor Xiaoming of Northern Wei 北魏孝明帝

Emperor of the Northern Wei dynasty
- Reign: February 12, 515 – March 31, 528
- Predecessor: Emperor Xuanwu
- Successor: Empress Regnant Wutai (Note: Empress Dowager Hu initially declared Emperor Xiaoming's "son" (actually a daughter) emperor, but almost immediately after admitted that she was actually female and declared Yuan Zhao emperor instead. Emperor Xiaoming's unnamed daughter was therefore arguably an "emperor" and his successor, but is not commonly regarded as one.)
- Born: 510
- Died: March 31, 528
- Burial: Ding Mausoleum (定陵)
- Issue: Empress Regnant Wutai
Names
- Family name: Yuán (元); Given name: Xǔ (詡)
Era dates
- Xīpíng (熙平) 516–518; Shénguī (神龜) 518–520; Zhēngguāng (正光) 520–525; Xiàochāng (孝昌) 525–527; Wǔtài (武泰) 528
Posthumous name
- Emperor Xiaoming (孝明皇帝; lit. "filial and understanding")
Temple name
- Suzong (肅宗)
- House: Yuan
- Dynasty: Northern Wei
- Father: Emperor Xuanwu
- Mother: Empress Dowager Hu

Emperor Xiaoming of (Northern) Wei ((北)魏孝明帝) (510 – March 31, 528), personal name Yuan Xu (元詡), was an emperor of the Xianbei-led Chinese Northern Wei dynasty. He ascended the throne in 515 at the age of five, and governmental matters were dominated by his mother Empress Dowager Hu (with an intervening regency by the official Yuan Cha from 520 to 525). In 528, Emperor Xiaoming tried to curb his mother's powers and kill her lover Zheng Yan (鄭儼) by conspiring with the general Erzhu Rong. As a result, the 18-year-old emperor was poisoned by his mother, who was soon overthrown by Erzhu. From that point on, Northern Wei royal lineage had no actual power. The next ruler, Emperor Xiaozhuang (507–531) was established by Erzhu. After Erzhu was assassinated by Emperor Xiaozhuang in November 530, rival generals Yuwen Tai and Gao Huan enthroned two royal offsprings, causing the country to split into two rival polities, Western Wei and Eastern Wei, both of which did not last long on the political map of the Northern and Southern dynasties.

== Background ==
Yuan Xu was born in 510. He was the only son of Emperor Xuanwu to be alive at that point. (Emperor Xuanwu had other sons before him, but each died in infancy or childhood, and only one of them, Yuan Chang (元昌), the son of Emperor Xuanwu's first wife Empress Yu, is known to historians by name.) Yuan Xu's mother was Emperor Xuanwu's concubine Consort Hu. As the only male offspring of Emperor Xuanwu, Yuan Xu obtained much of his father's attention: Emperor Xuanwu selected several experienced mothers to be Yuan Xu's wet nurses, forbidding his second wife Empress Gao and Consort Hu to be near him, perhaps because popular opinion at the time believed Yuan Chang to have been murdered by Empress Gao's (and Emperor Xuanwu's) uncle, Gao Zhao.

In winter 512, Emperor Xuanwu created Yuan Xu crown prince. Contrary to Northern Wei's tradition of putting the crown prince's mother to death at the time of creation, Emperor Xuanwu spared Consort Hu.

In 515, Emperor Xuanwu died suddenly, and Yuan Xu succeeded him (as Emperor Xiaoming). The official Yu Zhong and the imperial princes Yuan Yong the Prince of Gaoyang and Yuan Cheng (元澄) the Prince of Rencheng seized power from Empress Gao and, after ambushing and killing Gao Zhao, replaced Empress Gao as empress dowager with Consort Hu. Empress Dowager Hu became regent over the five-year-old emperor.

== First regency of Empress Dowager Hu ==
Empress Dowager Hu was considered intelligent, capable of understanding many things quickly, but she was also overly lenient and tolerant of corruption. She also became shamelessly promiscuous in her personal life. For example, in winter 515, the corrupt governor of Qi Province (岐州, roughly modern Baoji, Shaanxi), Yuan Mi (元謐) the Prince of Zhao, provoked a popular uprising when he killed several people without reason, and while he was relieved from his post, as soon as he returned to the capital Luoyang, Empress Dowager Hu made him a minister because his wife was her niece. In Yuan Xu's childhood, Empress Dowager Hu's power, during these few years, were unchallenged, and while she tolerated—and, in certain circumstances, encouraged—criticism, including rewarding such officials as Yuan Kuang (元匡) the Prince of Dongping and Zhang Puhui (張普惠) for their blunt words, she was slow to implement suggestions that would curb corruption. Empress Dowager Hu was a fervent Buddhist, and during this part of the regency, she built magnificent temples in Luoyang. One she built, dedicated to her father Hu Guozhen (胡國珍) the Duke of Qin, after his death in 518, was particularly beautiful. Because of her influence, Emperor Xiaoming also became a dedicated Buddhist. In his youth, however, he also favored spending time in imperial gardens rather than studies or learning about important affairs of state.

In 519, a serious riot occurred in Luoyang, after the official Zhang Zhongyu (張仲瑀) proposed that the civil service regulations be changed to disallow soldiers to become civilian officials. The soldiers became angry and stormed both the ministry of civil service and the mansion of Zhang Zhongyu's father, Zhang Yi (張彝), killing Zhang Yi and seriously injuring Zhang Zhongyu and his brother Zhang Shijun (張始均). Empress Dowager Hu arrested eight leaders of the riot and executed them, but pardoned the rest, to quell the unrest. She also rejected the proposal to change the civil service regulations. This event is often seen as the turning point and the start of the unrest that would eventually tear Northern Wei apart. Despite these events, Empress Dowager Hu continued to tolerate corruption, and she often gave exuberant awards to officials, draining the treasury; the pressure on the treasury and the burden on the people were further increased by her orders that each province was to build a tower dedicated to Buddhas.

Sometime before 520, Empress Dowager had forced Emperor Xiaoming's uncle Yuan Yi (元懌) the Prince of Qinghe, who was popular with the people and the officials because of his abilities and humility, to have an affair with her. Yuan Yi thereafter became the effective leader of government, and he tried to reorganize the administration to decrease corruption. He particularly tried to curb the powers of Empress Dowager Hu's brother-in-law Yuan Cha and the eunuch Liu Teng (劉騰). Yuan Cha therefore falsely accused him of treason, but he was cleared after an investigation. Fearful of reprisals, Yuan Cha and Liu convinced Emperor Xiaoming that Yuan Yi was trying to poison him and carried out a coup against Empress Dowager Hu and Yuan Yi, killing Yuan Yi and putting Empress Dowager Hu under house arrest. Yuan Yong became titular regent, but Yuan Cha became the actual power.

== Regency of Yuan Cha ==
Yuan Cha was not particularly able as a regent, and he and Liu multiplied their corruption once they were in power. Yuan Cha himself was not dedicated at all to the affairs of state, but spent much of his time on feasting, drinking, and women. He put his father Yuan Ji and his brothers into positions of power, and they were just as corrupt. Yuan Cha's incompetence and corruption, together with the level of corruption that Empress Dowager Hu herself tolerated while in power, led to popular dissatisfaction with the regime and many agrarian revolts, although the first revolt was by a non-agrarian—Yuan Xi (元熙) the Prince of Zhongshan, who was friendly with both Empress Dowager Hu and Yuan Yi—in fall 520, trying to avenge Yuan Yi and restore Empress Dowager Hu. Yuan Cha quickly had Yuan Xi's rebellion suppressed.

In late 520, Yuan Cha spent much of Northern Wei's energy on trying to restore Rouran's khan Yujiulü Anagui, who had been overthrown by his cousin Yujiulü Shifa (郁久閭示發), despite warnings that doing so would either be fruitless or counterproductive. The restoration was successful, but by 523 Yujiulü Anagui had rebelled and an enemy to Northern Wei again.

In spring 521, the general Xi Kangsheng (奚康生) made an attempt to restore Empress Dowager Hu, but failed. Yuan Cha had him put to death.

In 523, the official Li Chong (李崇) saw that the people of the six northern military garrisons, largely ethnic Xianbei, who had for generations been forced to stay at those garrisons to defend against Rouran attacks, were stirring with discontent, and he suggested to Yuan Cha and Emperor Xiaoming that the garrisons be converted into provinces and that the people be given the rights of the people of other provinces. Yuan Cha refused. Later that year, the people of Huaihuang (懷荒, in modern Zhangjiakou, Hebei) and Woye (沃野, in modern Baynnur, Inner Mongolia) Garrisons rebelled—rebellions that Northern Wei forces could not quickly quell, and the rebellions soon spread throughout not only the six garrisons but throughout virtually the entire empire. The more important rebels included:

- Poliuhan Baling (破六韓拔陵), with his rebellion concentrated around Woye
- Hu Chen (胡琛), Chile tribal chief, with his rebellion concentrated around Gaoping Garrison (高平, in modern Guyuan, Ningxia)
- Mozhe Dati (莫折大提), with his rebellion concentrated around Qin Province (秦州, roughly modern Tianshui, Gansu), later succeeded by his son Mozhe Niansheng (莫折念生), who declared himself Emperor of Qin

In 525, Yuan Faseng (元法僧), the governor of Xu Province (徐州, modern northern Jiangsu), who had been a close associate of Yuan Cha, believing that Yuan Cha would soon fall, rebelled as well, declaring himself emperor. After some initial defeats at the hands of Northern Wei forces sent against him, he surrendered his post of Pengcheng (彭城, in modern Xuzhou, Jiangsu) to Northern Wei's southern rival Liang dynasty.

By this point, Yuan Cha's precautions against Empress Dowager Hu had been greatly relaxed, particularly after Liu Teng's death in 523, as he no longer saw her as a threat. Empress Dowager Hu, Emperor Xiaoming, and Yuan Yong therefore took the chance to conspire against Yuan Cha. Empress Dowager Hu first threw Yuan Cha's guard off by often discussing about his overly trusting of Yuan Faseng, which caused Yuan Cha to be an apologetic mood. Then, with his agreement, she relieved him of his command of the imperial guards, replacing him with his associate Hou Gang (侯剛). In summer 525, she took sudden action and declared herself regent again, killing most of Yuan Cha's and Liu's associates and putting Yuan Cha under house arrest. However, she was initially hesitant to take further action against Yuan Cha, because of her relationship with her sister. Eventually, however, with popular opinion favoring Yuan Cha's death, she forced him and his brother Yuan Gua (元瓜) to commit suicide, but still posthumously awarded him much honor.

== Second regency of Empress Dowager Hu ==
Empress Dowager Hu, after resumption of her regency over Emperor Xiaoming, allowed her lover Zheng Yan to assume great power, and while Yuan Yong and Yuan Lüe (元略) the Prince of Dongping (Yuan Xi's brother) were trusted and had high ranks, Zheng and Zheng's associate Xu Ge (徐紇) were more powerful than they were. The agrarian and other revolts continued, and during these years, the more chief rebels included:

- Xianyu Xiuli (鮮于修禮), with his rebellion centering Ding Province (定州, roughly modern Baoding, Hebei. After Xianyu's death, his general Ge Rong took over and became very strong, proclaiming himself the Emperor of Qi
- Xiao Baoyin, son of Emperor Ming of Southern Qi, who sought to reestablish Southern Qi, with his rebellion centering Chang'an
- Xing Gao, with his rebellion centering Beihai (北海, roughly modern Weifang, Shandong)
- Moqi Chounu, who took over Hu Chen's army after Hu was killed by Poliuhan Baling

Empress Dowager Hu sent a number of generals against these rebels without much success, and while Xiao Baoyin was defeated by his own subordinates and forced to flee to Moqi, no other major rebels were defeated by Northern Wei generals. Exacerbating the situation was the fact that Empress Dowager Hu did not like to hear about news of rebel successes, and therefore her attendants often made up good news, causing her to often refuse generals' requests for reinforcements. Several times, Emperor Xiaoming publicly declared that he would personally lead armies against the rebels, but each time he failed to actually do so. Meanwhile, during these internal troubles that Northern Wei, Liang took advantage by capturing a number of border cities, including the important city Shouyang (壽陽, in modern Lu'an, Anhui).

The only real military success that Northern Wei had during this time happened in late 525, when it was able to recapture Pengcheng from Liang—and the success was fortuitous, as the Liang prince Xiao Zong (蕭綜), the son of Emperor Wu of Liang and his concubine Consort Wu, who was previously the concubine of Southern Qi emperor Xiao Baojuan, became convinced that he was actually Xiao Baojuan's posthumous son, and surrendered to Northern Wei, causing his own army to collapse and allowing Northern Wei to reenter Pengcheng.

During this period, Emperor Xiaoming, by now a teenager, was said to spend much of his time drinking. He was also said to favor his concubine Consort Pan greatly, to the exclusion of his wife Empress Hu (his cousin) and the other concubines.

== Death ==
In 528, Emperor Xiaoming's favorite concubine Consort Pan bore him a daughter. However, Empress Dowager Hu falsely declared that Consort Pan's child was a son, and ordered a general pardon.

By this time, Emperor Xiaoming, aged 18, was tired of the hold that his mother had on his administration, and he further despised Zheng Yan and Xu Ge. He therefore sent secret messengers to the general Erzhu Rong, who controlled the region around Bing Province (并州, modern central Shanxi), ordering him to advance on Luoyang to force Empress Dowager Hu to remove Zheng and Xu. After Erzhu advanced to Shangdang (上黨, in modern Changzhi, Shanxi), Emperor Xiaoming suddenly changed his mind and sent messengers to stop him, but the news leaked. Zheng and Xu therefore advised Empress Dowager Hu to have Emperor Xiaoming poisoned. She did so, and after initially announcing that Emperor Xiaoming's "son" by Consort Pan would succeed him, admitted that the "son" was actually a daughter, and instead selected Yuan Zhao the son of Yuan Baohui (元寶暉) the Prince of Lintao, two-years in age, to succeed Emperor Xiaoming. Erzhu Rong refused to recognize this arrangement, and soon arrived at and captured Luoyang, throwing Empress Dowager Hu and Yuan Zhao into the Yellow River to drown.

== Family ==
=== Consorts and issue ===
- Empress, of the Hu clan of Anding (皇后 安定胡氏), second cousin
- Chonghua, of the Pan clan (充華 潘氏), personal name Wailian (外憐)
  - Empress Wutai (武泰皇后, b.12 February 528), 1st daughter

== Notes ==
Regnal titles
Preceded by Emperor Xuanwu of Northern Wei	Emperor of Northern Wei; 515–528	Succeeded by Unnamed daughter
