= 462 =

462 in various calendars
Gregorian calendar	462; CDLXII
Ab urbe condita	1215
Assyrian calendar	5212
Balinese saka calendar	383–384
Bengali calendar	−132 – −131
Berber calendar	1412
Buddhist calendar	1006
Burmese calendar	−176
Byzantine calendar	5970–5971
Chinese calendar	辛丑年 (Metal Ox); 3159 or 2952 — to — 壬寅年 (Water Tiger); 3160 or 2953
Coptic calendar	178–179
Discordian calendar	1628
Ethiopian calendar	454–455
Hebrew calendar	4222–4223
- Hindu calendars
Vikram Samvat	518–519
Shaka Samvat	383–384
Kali Yuga	3562–3563
Holocene calendar	10462
Iranian calendar	160 BP – 159 BP
Islamic calendar	165 BH – 164 BH
Javanese calendar	347–348
Julian calendar	462; CDLXII
Korean calendar	2795
Minguo calendar	1450 before ROC 民前1450年
Nanakshahi calendar	−1006
Seleucid era	773/774 AG
Thai solar calendar	1004–1005
Tibetan calendar	阴金牛年 (female Iron-Ox); 588 or 207 or −565 — to — 阳水虎年 (male Water-Tiger); 589 or 208 or −564

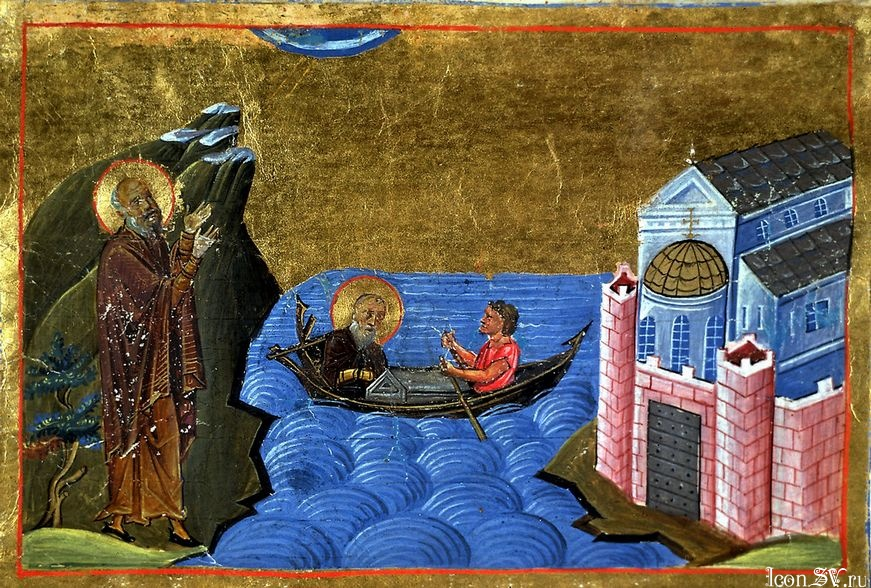
The Monastery of Stoudios (Turkey)

Year 462 (CDLXII) was a common year starting on Monday of the Julian calendar. At the time it was known as the Year of the Consulship of Severus and Leo (or, less frequently, year 1215 Ab urbe condita). The denomination 462 for this year has been used since the early medieval period, when the Anno Domini calendar era became the prevalent method in Europe for naming years.

== Events ==
=== By place ===
==== Roman Empire ====
- September 1 – Possible start of the first Byzantine indiction cycle.
- Vandal War (461-468): After negotiations, Emperor Leo I pays a large ransom for Licinia Eudoxia and Placidia. They return after seven years of captivity in Carthage.
- The Monastery of Stoudios is founded in Constantinople.

==== Asia ====
- The Daming calendar is introduced in China by mathematician Zu Chongzhi (approximate date).

== Births ==
- Anicia Juliana, daughter of Olybrius
- Muryeong, king of Baekje (Korea)
- Yu Zhong, official and regent of Northern Wei (d. 518)

== Deaths ==
- Lóegaire mac Néill, High King of Ireland
