= Yuan Cha =

Yuan Cha (Chinese: 元叉; 486 – 17 April 526), (Note: Yuan Cha was demoted to commoner status on the xinmao day of the 4th month of the 1st year of the Xiaochang era. The date corresponds to 24 May 525 in the Julian calendar. Yuan Cha and his brother were forced to commit suicide shortly after this. Yuan Cha's epitaph—魏故使持节侍中骠骑大将军仪同三司尚书令冀州刺史江阳王元公之墓志铭—indicates that he died at the age of 41 (by East Asian inclusive reckoning of lunisolar New Years) on the 20th day of the 3rd month of the 2nd year of the Xiaochang era. The date corresponds to 17 Apr 526 in the Julian calendar. (孝昌二年三月廿日，诏遣宿卫禁兵二千人夜围公第。公神色自若，都无惧容，乃启太师，开门延使者，与第五弟给事中山宾同时遇害。春秋卌有一。)) courtesy name Bojun (伯雋), nickname Yecha (夜叉), (Note: 叉，继长子，字伯俊，小字夜叉。) was an official of the Xianbei-led Northern Wei dynasty of China, who initially came to power as the brother-in-law of Emperor Xiaoming's mother and regent Empress Dowager Hu. In 520, after a conflict with her lover Yuan Yi (元懌) the Prince of Qinghe, he killed Yuan Yi and put Empress Dowager Hu under house arrest, effectively taking over as regent. In 525, a countercoup by Empress Dowager Hu restored her, and bowing to public pressure, she forced him to commit suicide.

== Background ==
Yuan Cha was the oldest son of Yuan Ji (元繼) the Prince of Jiangyang, who was a distant member of the imperial clan, whose ancestor was a son of Northern Wei's founder Emperor Daowu. (Note: Emperor Daowu's son Tuoba Li (拓跋黎) was the Prince of Jingzhao (京兆王); Tuoba Li's son Tuoba Gen (拓跋根) inherited the title after Li's death, and had his title changed to Prince of Jiangyang (江阳王). As Tuoba Gen had no sons, Tuoba Ji—Yuan Ji's name before Emperor Xiaowen's decree to change the imperial clan's surname—was made Tuoba Gen's heir by Emperor Xianwen, and inherited Gen's title. Tuoba Ji was the second son of Prince of Nanping (南平王) Tuoba Xiao (拓跋霄), original name Tuoba Feilong (拓跋飞龙). Tuoba Xiao was a son of Tuoba Hun (拓跋浑), the second son of Prince of Pingyang (阳平王) Tuoba Xi (拓跋熙). Tuoba Xi was also a son of Emperor Daowu.) He served as a low level official in Emperor Xuanwu's administration.

== Rise to power ==
After Emperor Xuanwu's death in February 515 and succession by his young son Emperor Xiaoming, Emperor Xiaoming's mother Empress Dowager Hu, who was Emperor Xuanwu's concubine, became regent. Yuan Cha had married Empress Dowager Hu's sister, whom she created the Lady of Fengyi and saw often. Because of this relationship, Yuan Cha became trusted by her and was continuously promoted. As a result, Yuan Cha became corrupt and arrogant.

Empress Dowager Hu forced Emperor Xuanwu's brother Yuan Yi the Prince of Qinghe, who was popular among the people and the officials for his humility and abilities, to have an affair with her. By 520, Yuan Yi was effectively the leader of the administration. He often curbed the abuses of power that both Yuan Cha and the eunuch Liu Teng (劉騰), who became powerful because he had once saved Empress Dowager Hu's life. Yuan Cha therefore had one of his associates, Song Wei (宋維), falsely accuse Yuan Yi of treason, and Empress Dowager Hu, for some time, put Yuan Yi under house arrest while she investigated, but eventually Yuan Yi was cleared. Yuan Cha, fearful of retaliation by Yuan Yi, conspired with Liu Teng, and after convincing the 10-year-old Emperor Xiaoming that Yuan Yi was in fact plotting treason, took Emperor Xiaoming into their custody and then carried out a coup against Yuan Yi and Empress Dowager Hu, executing Yuan Yi on 3 August 520 (Note: The bingzi day of the 7th month of the 1st year of the Zhengguang era. Yuan Yi's epitaph dates the event to the 3rd day (yihai day) of the 7th month of the 3rd year of the Shengui era, which corresponds to 2 Aug 520 in the Julian calendar (神龟三年岁次庚子，春秋三十有四，七月癸酉朔三日乙亥害王于位。).) and putting Empress Dowager Hu under house arrest. Yuan Cha made Emperor Xiaoming's granduncle Yuan Yong the Prince of Gaoyang the titular head of government, but in effect, Yuan Cha, in association with Liu, was the actual regent.

== Regency ==
Yuan Cha was not particularly able as a regent, and he and Liu multiplied their corruption once they were in power. Yuan Cha himself was not dedicated at all to the affairs of state, but spent much of his time on feasting, drinking, and women. He put his father Yuan Ji and his brothers into positions of power, and they were just as corrupt. Yuan Cha's incompetence and corruption, together with the level of corruption that Empress Dowager Hu herself tolerated while in power, led to popular dissatisfaction with the regime and many agrarian revolts, although the first revolt was by a non-agrarian—Yuan Xi (元熙) the Prince of Zhongshan, who was friendly with both Empress Dowager Hu and Yuan Yi—in fall 520, trying to avenge Yuan Yi and restore Empress Dowager Hu. Yuan Cha quickly had Yuan Xi's rebellion suppressed.

In late 520, Yuan Cha spent much of Northern Wei's energy on trying to restore Rouran's khan Yujiulü Anagui, who had been overthrown by his cousin Yujiulü Shifa (郁久閭示發), despite warnings that doing so would either be fruitless or counterproductive. The restoration was successful, but by 523 Yujiulü Anagui had rebelled and was an enemy to Northern Wei again.

On 18 April 521, (Note: The jiawu day of the 3rd month of the 2nd year of the Zhengguang era.) the general Xi Kangsheng (奚康生) made an attempt to restore Empress Dowager Hu, but failed. Yuan Cha had him put to death.

In 523, the official Li Chong (李崇) saw that the people of the six northern military garrisons, largely ethnic Xianbei, who had for generations been forced to stay at those garrisons to defend against Rouran attacks, were stirring with discontent, and he suggested to Yuan Cha and Emperor Xiaoming that the garrisons be converted into provinces and that the people be given the rights of the people of other provinces. Yuan Cha refused. Later that year, the people of Huaihuang (懷荒, in modern Zhangjiakou, Hebei) and Woye (沃野, in modern Bayan Nur, Inner Mongolia) Garrisons rebelled—rebellions that Northern Wei forces could not quickly quell, and the rebellions soon spread throughout not only the six garrisons but throughout virtually the entire empire.

== Death ==
In 525, Yuan Faseng (元法僧), the governor of Xu Province (徐州, modern northern Jiangsu), who had been a close associate of Yuan Cha, believing that Yuan Cha would soon fall, rebelled as well, declaring himself emperor. After some initial defeats at the hands of Northern Wei forces sent against him, he surrendered his post of Pengcheng (彭城, in modern Xuzhou, Jiangsu) to Northern Wei's southern rival Liang dynasty.

By this point, Yuan Cha's precautions against Empress Dowager Hu had been greatly relaxed, particularly after Liu Teng's death on 24 March 523, (Note: The jimao day of the 2nd month of the 4th year of the Zhengguang era.) as he no longer saw her as a threat. Empress Dowager Hu, Emperor Xiaoming, and Yuan Yong therefore took the chance to conspire against Yuan Cha. Empress Dowager Hu first threw Yuan Cha's guard off by often discussing about his overly trusting of Yuan Faseng, which caused Yuan Cha to be an apologetic mood. Then, with his agreement, she relieved him of his command of the imperial guards, replacing him with his associate Hou Gang (侯剛). In summer 525, she took sudden action and declared herself regent again, killing most of Yuan Cha's and Liu's associates and putting Yuan Cha under house arrest. (Note: The Zizhi Tongjian recorded that a Consort Pan was involved in convincing Emperor Xiaoming that Yuan Cha (named Yuan Yi here) would either harm her or the emperor; Yuan Cha was then stripped of the rest of his titles and demoted to commoner status (潘嫔有宠于魏主，宦官张景嵩说之云：“义欲害嫔。”嫔泣诉于帝曰：“义非独欲杀妾，又将不利于陛下。”帝信之，因义出宿，解义侍中。明旦，义将入宫，门者不纳。辛卯，太后复临朝摄政，下诏追削刘腾官爵，除义名为民。). Yuan Cha's biography in the Bei Shi recorded Consort Pan's full name as Pan Wailian (嵩以帝嫔潘外怜有幸，说云，元叉欲害之。嫔泣诉于帝云：“叉非直欲杀妾，亦将害陛下。”帝信之。后叉出宿，遂解其侍中。旦欲入宫，门者不纳。寻除名。), while Yuan Cha's biography in the Wei Shu did not record how he was demoted to commoner status (后叉出宿，遂解其侍中。旦欲入宫，门者不纳。寻除名为民。).) However, she was initially hesitant to take further action against Yuan Cha, because of her relationship with her sister. Eventually, however, he and his brother Yuan Zhua (元爪) (Note: The brothers were known as Yuan Yi (元义) and Yuan Gua (元瓜) respectively in the Zizhi Tongjian.) were accused of treason, and popular opinion (including Emperor Xiaoming) favored their deaths. As such, Empress Dowager Hu agreed that the two should be forced to commit suicide, (Note: 未几，有人告叉及其弟爪谋反，欲令其党攻近京诸县，破市烧邑郭以惊动内外，先遣其从弟洪业率六镇降户反于定州，又令人勾鲁阳诸蛮侵扰伊阙，叉兄弟为内应。起事有日，得其手书。灵太后以妹婿之故，未忍便决。黄门侍郎李琰之曰：“元叉之罪，具腾遐迩，岂容复停，以惑视听。”黄门徐纥趋前欲谏，逡巡未敢。群臣固执不已，肃宗又以为言，太后乃从之。于是叉及弟爪并赐死于家。) but still awarded Yuan Cha much posthumous honor.
