= Empress Dowager Hu (Northern Wei) =

Empress of Northern Wei (c. 490 – 528)

Empress Hu
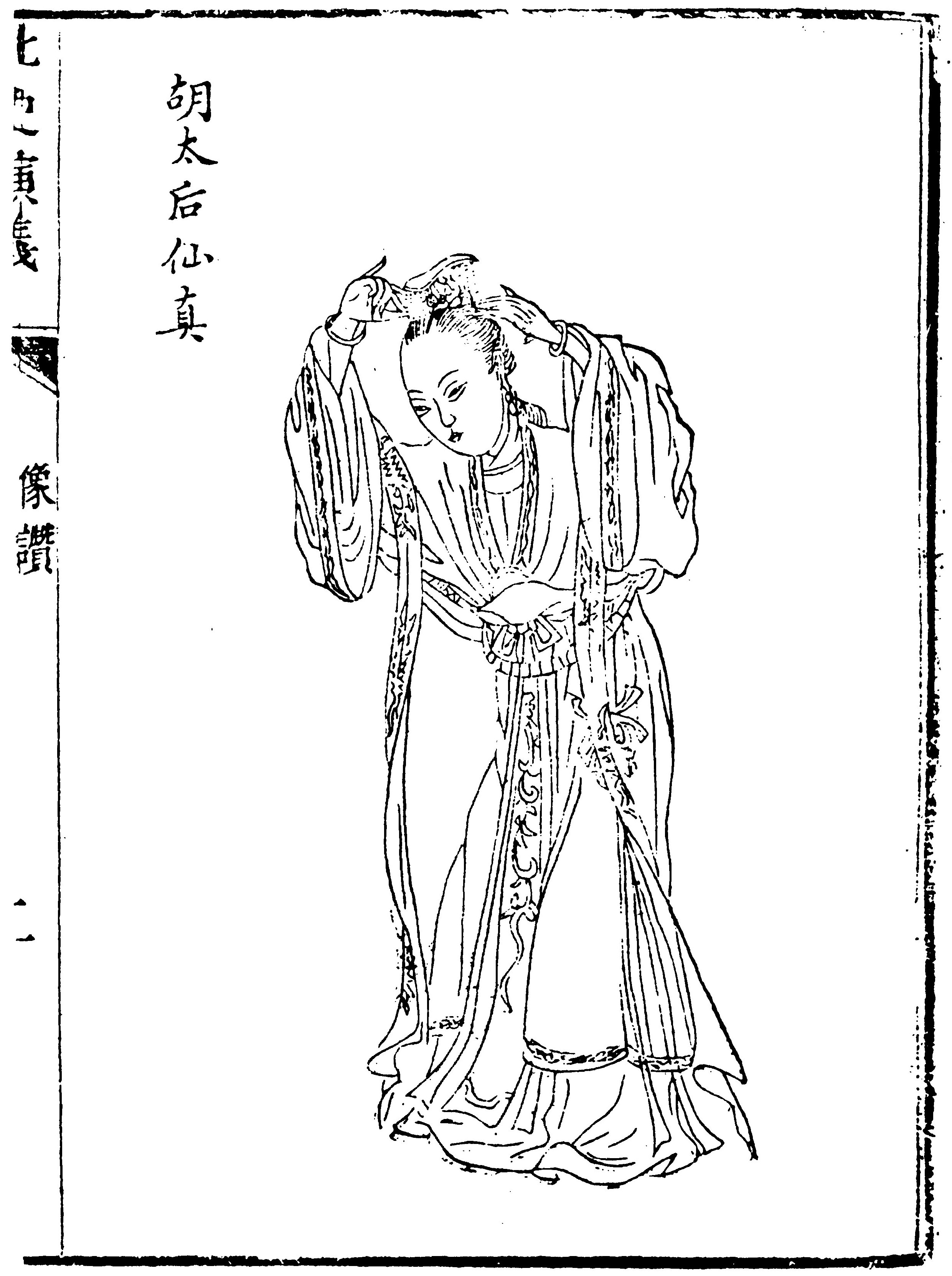
- Died: 17 May 528
- Spouse: Yuan Ke, Emperor Xuanwu
- Issue: Yuan Xu, Emperor Xiaoming
- Father: Hu Guozhen
- Mother: Lady Huangfu

Empress Dowager Hu (Chinese: 胡太后, personal name unknown) (490s? – 17 May 528 (Note: According to vol.152 of Zizhi Tongjian and Emperor Xiaoming's biography in Book of Wei, Lady Hu and Yuan Zhao died on the gengzi day of the 4th month of the 1st year of the Wutai era of his reign. This corresponds to 17 May 528 on the Julian calendar. Tongjian recorded the year as the 2nd year of the Datong era of the reign of Emperor Wu of Liang.)), formally Empress Ling (靈皇后), was an empress dowager of the Xianbei-led Chinese Northern Wei dynasty (515–528). She was a concubine of Emperor Xuanwu, and she became regent and empress dowager after her son Emperor Xiaoming became emperor after Emperor Xuanwu's death in 515. She was considered to be intelligent but overly lenient, and during her regency, (Note: interrupted between 520 to 525, where her overly trusted brother-in-law Yuan Cha seized power) many agrarian rebellions occurred while corruption raged among imperial officials. In 528, she was believed to have poisoned her son Emperor Xiaoming after he tried to have her lover Zheng Yan (鄭儼) executed. This caused the general Erzhu Rong to attack and capture the capital Luoyang. Erzhu threw her into the Yellow River to drown.

== As Emperor Xuanwu's concubine ==
It is not known when the future Empress Dowager Hu was born. Her father Hu Guozhen (胡國珍) was the hereditary Earl of Wushi, but appeared to carry no imperial offices initially after he inherited the title in 491. Hu Guozhen's sister was a well-known Buddhist nun, and she often preached inside the palace of Emperor Xuanwu, himself an avid Buddhist. On one of these lecture stints, which lasted several days, she told Emperor Xuanwu's attendants of her niece's beauty. When Emperor Xuanwu heard of this, he decided to take Hu Guozhen's daughter as a concubine—as an imperial consort of the rank Chonghua (充華). Because Consort Hu's aunt was a Buddhist nun, she also became well-versed in Buddhism. She was also said to be literate and capable of making quick decisions.

Because of Northern Wei's tradition that when a crown prince is created, his mother must be put to death, the imperial consorts often prayed that they only wished to give birth to princes who would not be crown prince or princesses, not the crown prince. However, Consort Hu prayed differently—particularly because Emperor Xuanwu lacked a son at this point—that because she did not want to see the empire without a crown prince, she was willing to do so. Eventually, she became pregnant, and her friends inside the palace suggested that she have an abortion. She refused, saying that she would rather die if she could be the mother of the crown prince. in 510, she gave birth to a son, Yuan Xu. Because Emperor Xuanwu had lost several sons by this point, he carefully selected experienced mothers to be Yuan Xu's wet nurses, and prohibited, for a while, either Consort Hu or his wife Empress Gao from seeing him. In 512, Emperor Xuanwu created Yuan Xu crown prince, but, abolishing the custom of putting the crown prince's mother to death, spared Consort Hu.

In 515, Emperor Xuanwu died suddenly, and Yuan Xu succeeded him (as Emperor Xiaoming). He initially honored Empress Gao as empress dowager, and gave Consort Hu the title of Consort Dowager. Empress Dowager Gao wanted to put Consort Hu to death, but she was protected by the officials Yu Zhong and Cui Guang (崔光), the general Hou Gang (侯剛), and the eunuch Liu Teng (劉騰). Yu and the imperial princes Yuan Yong the Prince of Gaoyang and Yuan Cheng (元澄) the Prince of Rencheng soon seized power from Empress Gao and, after ambushing and killing Empress Gao's powerful uncle Gao Zhao, replaced Empress Gao as empress dowager with Consort Hu. Empress Dowager Hu became regent over the five-year-old emperor.

== First regency ==
Empress Dowager Hu to exert her power as the highest ruler of Northern Wei, she addressed herself as Zhen (Chinese: 朕; pinyin: Zhèn), a first-person pronoun reserved for use by the emperor after the Qin dynasty. Officials addressed her as Bixia (Chinese: 陛下; pinyin: Bìxià), an honorific used when addressing the emperor directly. Empress Dowager Hu was considered intelligent, capable of understanding many things quickly, but she was also overly lenient and tolerant of corruption. For example, in winter 515, the corrupt governor of Qi Province (岐州, roughly modern Baoji, Shaanxi), Yuan Mi (元謐) the Prince of Zhao Commandery, provoked a popular uprising when he killed several people without reason, and while he was relieved from his post, as soon as he returned to the capital Luoyang, Empress Dowager Hu made him a minister because his wife was her niece. In Yuan Xu's childhood, Empress Dowager Hu's power, during these few years, were unchallenged, and while she tolerated—and, in certain circumstances, encouraged—criticism, including rewarding such officials as Yuan Kuang (元匡) the Prince of Dongping and Zhang Puhui (張普惠) for their blunt words, she was slow to implement suggestions that would curb corruption. Empress Dowager Hu was a devout Buddhist, and during this part of the regency, she built magnificent temples in Luoyang. One she built, dedicated to her father Hu Guozhen, whom she had created the Duke of Qin, after his death in 518, was particularly beautiful. Because of her influence, Emperor Xiaoming also became a dedicated Buddhist.

In 519, a serious riot occurred in Luoyang, after the official Zhang Zhongyu (張仲瑀) proposed that the civil service regulations be changed to disallow soldiers to become civilian officials. The soldiers became angry and stormed both the ministry of civil service and the mansion of Zhang Zhongyu's father, Zhang Yi (張彝), killing Zhang Yi and seriously injuring Zhang Zhongyu and his brother Zhang Shijun (張始均). Empress Dowager Hu arrested eight leaders of the riot and executed them, but pardoned the rest, to quell the unrest. She also rejected the proposal to change the civil service regulations. This event is often seen as the turning point and the start of the unrest that would eventually tear Northern Wei apart. Despite these events, Empress Dowager Hu continued to tolerate corruption, and she often gave exuberant awards to officials, draining the treasury; the pressure on the treasury and the burden on the people were further increased by her orders that each province was to build a tower dedicated to Buddhas.

Sometime before 520, Empress Dowager had forced Emperor Xiaoming's uncle Yuan Yi (元懌) the Prince of Qinghe, who was popular with the people and the officials because of his abilities and humility, to have an affair with her. Yuan Yi thereafter became the effective leader of government, and he tried to reorganize the administration to decrease corruption. He particularly tried to curb the powers of Empress Dowager Hu's brother-in-law Yuan Cha and the eunuch Liu Teng. Yuan Cha therefore falsely accused him of treason, but he was cleared after an investigation. Fearful of reprisals, Yuan Cha and Liu convinced Emperor Xiaoming that Yuan Yi was trying to poison him and carried out a coup against Empress Dowager Hu and Yuan Yi, killing Yuan Yi and putting Empress Dowager Hu under house arrest. Yuan Yong became titular regent, but Yuan Cha became the actual power.

== House arrest by Yuan Cha ==
Yuan Cha was not particularly able as a regent, and he and Liu multiplied their corruption once they were in power. Yuan Cha himself was not dedicated at all to the affairs of state, but spent much of his time on feasting, drinking, and women. He put his father Yuan Ji and his brothers into positions of power, and they were just as corrupt. Yuan Cha's incompetence and corruption, together with the level of corruption that Empress Dowager Hu herself tolerated while in power, led to popular dissatisfaction with the regime and many agrarian revolts, although the first revolt was by a non-agrarian—Yuan Xi (元熙) the Prince of Zhongshan, who was friendly with both Empress Dowager Hu and Yuan Yi—in fall 520, trying to avenge Yuan Yi and restore Empress Dowager Hu. Yuan Cha quickly had Yuan Xi's rebellion suppressed.

In spring 521, the general Xi Kangsheng (奚康生) made an attempt to restore Empress Dowager Hu, but failed. Yuan Cha had him put to death.

In 523, the official Li Chong (李崇) saw that the people of the six northern military garrisons, largely ethnic Xianbei, who had for generations been forced to stay at those garrisons to defend against Rouran attacks, were stirring with discontent, and he suggested to Yuan Cha and Emperor Xiaoming that the garrisons be converted into provinces and that the people be given the rights of the people of other provinces. Yuan Cha refused. Later that year, the people of Huaihuang (懷荒, in modern Zhangjiakou, Hebei) and Woye (沃野, in modern Bayan Nur, Inner Mongolia) Garrisons rebelled—rebellions that Northern Wei forces could not quickly quell, and the rebellions soon spread throughout not only the six garrisons but throughout virtually the entire empire. In 525, Yuan Faseng (元法僧), the governor of Xu Province (徐州, modern northern Jiangsu), who had been a close associate of Yuan Cha, believing that Yuan Cha would soon fall, rebelled as well, declaring himself emperor. After some initial defeats at the hands of Northern Wei forces sent against him, he surrendered his post of Pengcheng to Northern Wei's southern rival Liang dynasty.

By this point, Yuan Cha's precautions against Empress Dowager Hu had been greatly relaxed, particularly after Liu Teng's death in 523, as he no longer saw her as a threat. Empress Dowager Hu, Emperor Xiaoming, and Yuan Yong therefore took the chance to conspire against Yuan Cha. Empress Dowager Hu first threw Yuan Cha's guard off by often discussing about his overly trusting of Yuan Faseng, which caused Yuan Cha to be an apologetic mood. Then, with his agreement, she relieved him of his command of the imperial guards, replacing him with Hou Gang, who had become close to him. In summer 525, she took sudden action and declared herself regent again, killing most of Yuan Cha's and Liu's associates and putting Yuan Cha under house arrest. However, she was initially hesitant to take further action against Yuan Cha, because of her relationship with her sister. Eventually, however, with popular opinion favoring Yuan Cha's death, she forced him and his brother Yuan Gua (元瓜) to commit suicide, but still posthumously awarded him much honor.

== Second regency ==
Empress Dowager Hu, after resumption of her regency over Emperor Xiaoming, became more and more dictatorial and lewd. She allowed her lover Zheng Yan to assume great power; while Yuan Yong and Yuan Lüe (元略) the Prince of Dongping (Yuan Xi's brother) were trusted and had high ranks, Zheng and Zheng's associate Xu Ge (徐紇) (Note: There are two pronunciations to the character "紇":"hé" and "gē".) were more powerful than they were. Both her lifestyle and her ruling style elicited widespread dissatisfaction among officials and from her son. The agrarian and other revolts continued, and during these years, the more major rebels included:

- Xianyu Xiuli (鮮于修禮), with his rebellion centering Ding Province (定州, roughly modern Baoding, Hebei. After Xianyu's death, his general Ge Rong took over and became very strong, proclaiming himself the Emperor of Qi
- Xiao Baoyin, son of Emperor Ming of Southern Qi, who sought to reestablish Southern Qi, with his rebellion centering Chang'an
- Xing Gao, with his rebellion centering Beihai (roughly modern Weifang, Shandong)
- Moqi Chounu, with his rebellion centering Gaoping (高平, roughly modern Guyuan, Ningxia)

Empress Dowager Hu sent a number of generals against these rebels without much success, and while Xiao Baoyin was defeated by his own subordinates and forced to flee to Moqi, no other major rebels were defeated by Northern Wei generals. Exacerbating the situation was that Empress Dowager Hu did not like to hear about news of rebel successes, and therefore her attendants often made up good news, causing her to often refuse generals' requests for reinforcements. Several times, Emperor Xiaoming publicly declared that he would personally lead armies against the rebels, but each time he failed to actually do so. Meanwhile, during these internal troubles that Northern Wei, Liang took advantage by capturing a number of border cities, including the important city Shouyang.

The only real military success that Northern Wei had during this time happened in late 525, when it was able to recapture Pengcheng from Liang—and the success was fortuitous, as the Liang prince Xiao Zong (蕭綜), the son of Emperor Wu of Liang and his concubine Consort Wu, who was previously the concubine of Southern Qi emperor Xiao Baojuan, became convinced that he was actually Xiao Baojuan's posthumous son, and surrendered to Northern Wei, causing his own army to collapse and allowing Northern Wei to reenter Pengcheng.

Sometime during this second regency, Empress Dowager Hu, to further enhance her clan's prestige, married a daughter of her cousin Hu Sheng (胡盛) to Emperor Xiaoming, to be his empress. However, Emperor Xiaoming favored his concubine Consort Pan, and Empress Hu and the other concubines did not receive much favor from him. In 528, Consort Pan bore him a daughter. However, Empress Dowager Hu falsely declared that Consort Pan's child was a son, and ordered a general pardon.

By this time, Emperor Xiaoming, aged 18, was tired of the hold that his mother had on his administration, and he further despised Zheng Yan and Xu Ge. He therefore sent secret messengers to the general Erzhu Rong, who controlled the region around Bing Province (并州, modern central Shanxi), ordering him to advance on Luoyang to force Empress Dowager Hu to remove Zheng and Xu. After Erzhu advanced to Shangdang (上黨, in modern Changzhi, Shanxi), Emperor Xiaoming suddenly changed his mind and sent messengers to stop him, but the news leaked. Zheng (Note: After Lady Hu's death, Erzhu Rong sent troops to Luoyang. Zheng Yan then fled to Xingyang, where his cousin Zheng Zhongming was Administrator. The pair attempted to rebel at Xingyang, but were killed by their subordinates; their heads were then sent to Luoyang.) and Xu (Note: After Lady Hu's death, Xu Ge escaped from Luoyang at night and went east to Yanzhou, along with 10 good steeds from the imperial stables. Xu then informed his younger brothers Xu Xianbo and Xu Jiyan (who were officials at Beihai and Qingzhou respectively); the trio later headed south with their families. Xu Ge then went to Taishan to join its Administrator Yang Kan; Xu later convinced Yang to rebel. During the reign of Emperor Xiaozhuang, Yu Hui and Gao Huan were sent to quell the rebellion. Fearing that he would not be pardoned, Xu Ge then persuaded Yang Kan to surrender to Southern Liang. Xu's written works, numbering several dozen scrolls, were largely lost in the north by the time of the Northern Qi dynasty, when the Book of Wei was compiled; Wei Shou believed that they still existed elsewhere.) therefore advised Empress Dowager Hu to have Emperor Xiaoming poisoned. She did so, and after initially announcing that Emperor Xiaoming's "son" by Consort Pan would succeed him, admitted that the "son" was actually a daughter, and instead selected Yuan Zhao the son of Yuan Baohui (元寶暉) the Prince of Lintao, two-years in age, to succeed Emperor Xiaoming.

== Death ==
Erzhu Rong refused to recognize Yuan Zhao as emperor. With support from his associate Yuan Tianmu, he issued a harshly worded statement accusing Zheng and Xu of poisoning Emperor Xiaoming. Empress Dowager Hu sent Erzhu Rong's cousin Erzhu Shilong to try to persuade him to change his mind, but Erzhu Shilong instead encouraged him to continue his resistance. He therefore prepared to advance south, and meanwhile sent messengers to persuade Emperor Xuanwu's well-regarded cousin Yuan Ziyou the Prince of Changle to accept the throne as a competing claimant to the throne. Yuan Ziyou agreed, and as Erzhu Rong approached Luoyang, Yuan Ziyou and his brothers Yuan Shao (元劭) the Prince of Pengcheng and Yuan Zizheng (元子正) the Duke of Bacheng secretly left Luoyang to join Erzhu's army. Erzhu declared him emperor (as Emperor Xiaozhuang). As soon as news of Emperor Xiaozhuang's ascension reached Luoyang, Luoyang's defenses collapsed, and Zheng and Xu, abandoning Empress Dowager Hu, fled, while the generals Zheng Xianhu (鄭先護, Zheng Yan's cousin) and Fei Mu (費穆) surrendered to Erzhu Rong.

Upon hearing the bad news, Empress Dowager Hu ordered all of Emperor Xiaoming's consorts to become nuns. She herself took tonsure as well, but did not declare herself a nun. Erzhu ordered the imperial officials to welcome Emperor Xiaozhuang into the capital, and the officials complied. Erzhu then sent cavalry soldiers to arrest Empress Dowager Hu and Yuan Zhao and deliver them to his camp at Heyin (河陰, near Luoyang). Once Empress Dowager Hu met Erzhu, she tried to repeatedly explain and defend her actions. Erzhu became impatient of her explanations, and he left abruptly and ordered that Empress Dowager Hu and Yuan Zhao be thrown into the Yellow River to drown.

Shortly after Empress Dowager Hu's death by drowning, her body was recovered. Her sister Hu Xuanhui (胡玄辉), the Lady of Pingyi, took her body and stored it at the Shuangling Temple (雙靈寺). In 533, during the reign of Emperor Xiaowu, she was buried with honors due an empress and given a posthumous name "Ling" (靈, lit. spirit).

== See also ==
- History of China
- List of Chinese people
