= Empress Yu (Northern Wei) =

Empress Yu (于皇后, personal name unknown) (c.488 (Note: Lady Yu's biography in Book of Wei indicated that she was 14 (by East Asian reckoning) when she was made empress. Thus by calculation, her birth year should be about 488.) – 1 December 507), formally Empress Shun (顺皇后), was an empress of the Xianbei-led Northern Wei dynasty of China. She was Emperor Xuanwu's first empress.

She was the daughter of Yu Jing (于勁), the younger brother of the powerful general Yu Lie (于烈). (Note: Yu Zhong's father) It was said that when Emperor Xuanwu first assumed imperial powers — which probably referred to his relieving his uncle Yuan Xie of authorities in 501 — Yu Lie believed that the emperor lacked sufficient consorts, and so persuaded Emperor Xuanwu's attendants to praise her beauty and virtues. Emperor Xuanwu took her as an imperial consort with the rank of guiren. Emperor Xuanwu greatly favored her and on 5 October 501 created her empress. She was said to be quiet, tolerant, and not jealous. The Empress and the Emperor had one son, Yuan Chang (元昌), in 506. By that point, however, she was said to have lost his favor, as he favored his cousin Consort Gao, and their uncle Gao Zhao became exceedingly powerful. When Empress Yu suddenly died in 507, it was believed that Consort Gao poisoned her, but historians concede that there is no conclusive evidence. When her son Yuan Chang died the following year (508), it was also alleged that Gao Zhao had him poisoned.

== Notes ==
Chinese royalty
Preceded by Empress Feng Run	Empress of Northern Wei; 501–507	Succeeded by Empress Gao
