= Yuan Xie =

Chinese imperial prince (died 508)

Yuan Xie (元勰) (died 27 October 508), né Tuoba Xie (拓跋勰, changed 496), courtesy name Yanhe (彥和), formally Prince Wuxuan of Pengcheng (彭城武宣王), later posthumously honored as Emperor Wenmu (文穆皇帝) with the temple name of Suzu (肅祖), was an imperial prince of the Xianbei-led Northern Wei dynasty of China. He was a son of Emperor Xianwen, and he often assisted his brother Emperor Xiaowen both in military and governmental matters. After Emperor Xiaowen's death, he briefly served as regent for Emperor Xiaowen's son Emperor Xuanwu. Eventually, due to suspicions and jealousy of Emperor Xuanwu's uncle Gao Zhao, Emperor Xuanwu believed false reports that Yuan Xie was going to rebel, and forced him to commit suicide. He was later posthumously honored as an emperor by his son Emperor Xiaozhuang, although subsequently Emperor Jiemin retracted the honors.

== Background ==
It is not known when Tuoba Xie was born, but he was a younger brother to Emperor Xiaowen and was younger to all of the six other sons of their father Emperor Xianwen except Tuoba Xiang (拓跋詳) the Prince of Beihai. His mother was Consort Pan, who died shortly after giving birth to him. In July 476, his father Emperor Xianwen (who was then retired emperor after having passed the throne to Emperor Xiaowen in 471) died as well, probably having been poisoned by Tuoba Xie's step-grandmother Empress Dowager Feng, who then assumed regency over Emperor Xiaowen as grand empress dowager. Tuoba Xie was considered studious and well-mannered in his youth, and was much favored by both Emperor Xiaowen and their step-grandmother Grand Empress Dowager Feng.

== During Emperor Xiaowen's reign ==
On 29 April 485, Emperor Xiaowen created Tuoba Xie the Prince of Shi'ping. During the years, as Emperor Xiaowen assumed more and more of governing responsibilities himself, he increasingly had Tuoba Xie participate in his decision-making. In 496, as part of Emperor Xiaowen's sinicization campaign, the entire imperial clan's surname was changed from Tuoba to Yuan, and at the same time, Yuan Xie's title was changed from Prince of Shipping to Prince of Pengcheng. Yuan Xie was apprehensive about having too much power, and several times requested to be relieved of his responsibilities; each time, Emperor Xiaowen refused. Also in 496, Emperor Xiaowen, angry that another brother, Yuan Xi (元禧) the Prince of Xianyang, had married a daughter of a servant as his princess, forcibly ordered all of his brothers to demote their wives to concubine status and marry the daughters of several high level officials, and Yuan Xie was required to marry Li Yuanhua (李媛华)，the daughter of Li Chong (李沖).

In 498, when Emperor Xiaowen carried out a major southern campaign against rival Southern Qi, Yuan Xie was one of the key commanding generals, although it is not clear whether he saw combat. Also that year, Emperor Xiaowen made him in charge of the imperial clan members' education (presumably of a sinicized education). Later that year, due to the military expenditures, Yuan Xie proposed that he himself donate one-year salary for the war effort; in response, Emperor Xiaowen ordered a general one-third reduction in salary for imperial princes and dukes. That winter, Emperor Xiaowen got extremely ill, and Yuan Xie personally attended to him in his illness, praying to the gods and their father Emperor Xianwen, offering to die instead of Emperor Xiaowen. Emperor Xiaowen subsequently recovered from this illness.

It was during this illness that Emperor Xiaowen's (and Yuan Xie's) sister the Princess Pengcheng, not willing to marry Feng Su (馮夙) the Duke of Beiping, the brother of Emperor Xiaowen's wife Empress Feng Run, fled out of the capital Luoyang and joined Emperor Xiaowen and Yuan Xie, informing them that Empress Feng had been carrying on an affair with her attendant Gao Pusa (高菩薩). Upon Emperor Xiaowen's return to Luoyang in early 499, he personally interrogated Gao and another attendant of Empress Feng, Shuang Meng (雙蒙), and then personally interrogated Empress Feng as well. Upon the completion of these interrogations, Emperor Xiaowen summoned Yuan Xie and Yuan Xi, informing them of Empress Feng's indiscretions and, while not deposing her (because she was a daughter of Grand Empress Dowager Feng's brother Feng Xi (馮熙)), told them that he had no intention for them to continue to treat her as a sister-in-law, and they did not after this point. Later that year, Emperor Xiaowen became ill again, and he made Yuan Xie his prime minister, with intention that Yuan Xie serve as regent for his son Yuan Ke. It was said that Emperor Xiaowen was highly irritable during his illness and often ordered attendants' deaths, but Yuan Xie would plead on their behalf and have them saved. When Emperor Xiaowen grew sicker still in the summer while on a campaign against Southern Qi's key general Chen Xianda (陳顯達), he told Yuan Xie that he intended for Yuan Xie to serve as regent, and that Yuan Xie should force Empress Feng to commit suicide after his death. Yuan Xie declined the regency, explaining that this would bring too much suspicion on himself, and Emperor Xiaowen agreed, leaving instructions for Yuan Ke to, once his rule was firm, to allow Yuan Xie to resign his posts. Instead of a sole regency by Yuan Xie, Emperor Xiaowen also, pursuant to his suggestions, entrusted the crown prince to Yuan Xi, his brother Yuan Xiang (元詳) the Prince of Beihai, his cousin Yuan Cheng (元澄) the Prince of Rencheng, his distant uncle Yuan Jia (元嘉) the Prince of Guangyang, and the officials Wang Su (王肅) and Song Bian (宋弁). He soon died, while still on the front, and Yuan Xie, after discussing with Yuan Cheng, chose not to announce the emperor's death but instead headed back toward Luoyang while summoning Yuan Ke to rendezvous with them. They met at Luyang (魯陽, in modern Pingdingshan, Henan), and only then was the death of Emperor Xiaowen announced. Yuan Ke succeeded to the throne as Emperor Xuanwu.

During this transition, many people, particularly Emperor Xuanwu's attendants, suspected Yuan Xie of wanting the throne himself, but Yuan Xie handled the situation carefully and treated his nephew with respect due an emperor, and eventually the suspicion subsided. Meanwhile, pursuant to Emperor Xiaowen's instructions, he sent Yuan Xiang to force Empress Feng to commit suicide.

== During Emperor Xuanwu's reign ==
Emperor Xuanwu, who was 16 at the time of his ascension, initially wanted Yuan Xie to stay as his prime minister, but Yuan Xie repeatedly declined, citing Emperor Xiaowen's agreement for him to leave his posts. Emperor Xuanwu, instead, made him the governor of Ding Province (定州, modern central Hubei), and initially Yuan Xie declined as well, but Emperor Xuanwu forced him to accept. In 500, when the Southern Qi general Pei Shuye (裴叔業) surrendered his city Shouyang to northern Wei, Emperor Xuanwu sent Yuan Xie and Wang Su to secure Shouyang and to assist Pei. They were able to, and Emperor Xuanwu subsequently rebestowed the prime minister title on Yuan Xie, but had him take the post of governor of Yang Province (揚州, modern central Anhui) and defend Shouyang. Soon, he recalled Yuan Xie to the capital to be prime minister again.

In 501, over a power conflict between Yuan Xi and the general Yu Lie (于烈), Yu Lie's son Yu Zhong, a close attendant of Emperor Xuanwu warned Emperor Xuanwu that the princes were too powerful, and that he should assume power himself. Yuan Xiang also reported on Yuan Xi's faults and suggested that Yuan Xie was also too powerful. In spring 501, Emperor Xuanwu summoned his princely uncles to the palace under heavy guard, and then relieved them (except Yuan Xiang) of their posts, and announced that he was assuming power himself. From this point on, however, Emperor Xuanwu's government was dominated by his attendants and his maternal uncle Gao Zhao. In 503, Emperor Xuanwu recalled Yuan Xie to his administration with the honorific title Taishi (太師), but the title, while highly honored, carried little power.

in 504, Yuan Xiang, who was then powerful, was accused by Gao Zhao of corruption, and he was arrested. He soon died while imprisoned. As a result of this episode, Gao further suggested to Emperor Xuanwu to put the imperial princes under heavy guard, a suggestion that Yuan Xie objected to but Emperor Xuanwu accepted. It was said that Yuan Xie was often depressed from this point on. Late that year, Emperor Xuanwu made Yuan Xie be in charge of supervising a team of officials led by Yuan Fan (袁翻) in revising the empire's laws. In 506, when the official Zhen Chen (甄琛) suggested that the state monopoly on salt be ended, Yuan Xie, along with Xing Luan (邢巒), opposed on account that ending the monopoly would lead to wastefulness and draining of the treasury, but Emperor Xuanwu approved Zhen's proposal anyway.

As the years went by, Gao Zhao grew increasingly powerful, particularly more so after his niece Consort Gao became a favorite consort of Emperor Xuanwu. After Emperor Xuanwu's first wife, Empress Yu died in 507, Emperor Xuanwu wanted to make Consort Gao empress. Yuan Xie opposed, but Emperor Xuanwu created her empress in 508 anyway. Gao Zhao thereafter despised Yuan Xie. When Emperor Xuanwu's brother Yuan Yu (元愉) the Prince of Jingzhao rebelled in fall 508, Yuan Yu seized Yuan Xie's maternal uncle Pan Senggu (潘僧固) and forced Pan to join his rebellion, and Gao Zhao used this incident to falsely accuse Yuan Xie of conspiring with Yuan Yu and rival Liang Dynasty (which had replaced Southern Qi). Yuan Xie's attendants Wei Yan (魏偃) and Gao Zuzhen (高祖珍), wanting to please Gao Zhao, testified against Yuan Xie, and Emperor Xuanwu believed him. Later that year, Emperor Xuanwu held a feast and invited the princes and Gao Zhao to attend—requiring Yuan Xie to do so despite the fact that his wife Princess Li was due to give birth. After the feast, the princes were directed to bedrooms in the palace to spend the night. That night, Emperor Xuanwu sent the guard commander Yuan Zhen (元珍) to take poisoned wine to Yuan Xie, ordering him to commit suicide. Yuan Xie initially refused, wanting to make one last appeal to Emperor Xuanwu, but Yuan Zhen's soldiers battered his ribs until he complied. Once he drank the wine, the soldiers killed him even before the poison could take effect. His body was wrapped in blankets and returned to his mansion, under the pretense that he had died from alcohol poisoning, although quickly the populace came to believe that Gao Zhao had killed him. Emperor Xuanwu outwardly mourned Yuan Xie and posthumously honored him.

== Family ==
Consorts and Issue:

- Empress Wenmu, of the Li clan of Longxi (文穆皇后 隴西李氏; 483–524), personal name Yuanhua (媛華)
  - Yuan Shao, Emperor Xiaoxuan (孝宣皇帝 元劭; d. 528), second son
  - Princess Guangcheng (光城公主), personal name Chuhua (楚華)
    - Married Feng Hao of Changle, Duke Changle (長樂 馮顥)
  - Princess Feng (豐公主), personal name Jiwang (季望), second daughter
    - Married Li Yu of Longxi, Duke Dongping (隴西 李彧) in 525, and had issue (seven sons)
  - Yuan Ziyou, Emperor Xiaozhuang (孝莊皇帝 元子攸; 507–531), third son
  - Yuan Zizheng, Prince Zhen of Shiping (始平貞王 元子正; 508–528), fourth son
- Unknown
  - Yuan Zizhi, Prince of Chenliu (陳留王 元子直; d. 524), first son
  - Princess Xiangcheng (襄城公主)
    - Married Cui Du (崔瓄)
  - Princess Ningling (寧陵公主; 489–510)
    - Married Wang Song of Langya (瑯琊 王誦; 482–528)
  - Princess Shouyang (壽陽公主; d. 530), personal name Juli (莒犁)
    - Married Xiao Zong of Lanling (蘭陵 蕭綜; 502–531), the posthumous son of Xiao Baojuan, in 528

== Ancestry ==
Emperor Taiwu of Northern Wei (408–452)
Tuoba Huang (428–451)
Empress Jing'ai (d. 428)
Emperor Wencheng of Northern Wei (440–465)
Yujiulü Chen
Empress Gong
Emperor Xianwen of Northern Wei (454–476)
Li Fangshu
Empress Yuan (d. 456)
Yuan Xie (473–508)
Pan Meng
Pan Mi
Lady Pan of Changle
