= Empress Hu (Yuan Xu's wife) =

Empress Hu (胡皇后, personal name unknown) was an empress of the Xianbei-led Northern Wei dynasty of China. Her husband was Emperor Xiaoming.

Little is known about Empress Hu personally—including when she became empress. It is known that she was the daughter of Hu Sheng (胡盛), a cousin of Emperor Xiaoming's mother Empress Dowager Hu. Empress Dowager Hu selected her to be Emperor Xiaoming's empress, because Empress Dowager Hu wanted to strengthen her clan. However, Emperor Xiaoming often spent time drinking, and he favored his concubine Consort Pan. Empress Hu and the other concubines did not have his favor, and she did not bear him any children. (His only child, a daughter, was born of Consort Pan.) It was described that his concubines Consorts Cui, Lu, and Li, among others, would often fight among themselves, but she largely stayed clear of these disputes. After Emperor Xiaoming's death in 528, she became a Buddhist nun at Yaoguang Temple. Nothing further is known about her.

Chinese royalty
Preceded by Empress Gao	Empress of Northern Wei ?–528	Succeeded by Empress Erzhu (Yuan Ziyou's wife)
