= Yuan Zhao =

Yuan Zhao 元釗

Emperor of Northern Wei
- Reign: April 2 – May 17, 528
- Predecessor: Empress Regnant Wutai (Note: Empress Dowager Hu initially declared Emperor Xiaoming's "son" (actually a daughter) emperor, but almost immediately after admitted that she was actually female and declared Yuan Zhao emperor instead. Emperor Xiaoming's unnamed daughter was therefore arguably an "emperor" and his successor, but is not commonly regarded as one.)
- Successor: Emperor Xiaozhuang
- Born: 526
- Died: May 17, 528
Names
- Family name: Yuán (元); Given name: Zhāo (釗)
Era name and dates
- Wǔtài (武泰): 528
- House: Yuan
- Dynasty: Northern Wei

Yuan Zhao (Chinese: 元釗) (526 – May 17, 528), also known in historiography as Youzhu of Northern Wei (北魏幼主; literally "the young lord"), was briefly an emperor of the Xianbei-led Chinese Northern Wei dynasty.

== Background ==
Yuan Zhao was a son of Yuan Baohui (元寶暉) the Prince of Lintao, who was a grandson of Emperor Xiaowen (via his son Yuan Yu (元愉)) and therefore cousin to Emperor Xiaoming, the reigning emperor at the time of Yuan Zhao's birth in 526.

== Reign ==
In 528, Emperor Xiaoming was poisoned to death by his mother Empress Dowager Hu after trying to curb her power and trying to kill her lover Zheng Yan (鄭儼). Emperor Xiaoming was sonless, and while Empress Dowager Hu initially tried to pretend that Emperor Xiaoming's daughter, by his concubine Consort Pan, was actually a son, she soon realized that she could not carry on the deception, and she named Yuan Zhao emperor—selecting him due to his young age so that she could control him.

The general Erzhu Rong, with whom Emperor Xiaoming had conspired against Empress Dowager Hu, refused to recognize Yuan Zhao as emperor, quickly descending on the capital Luoyang with his troops and declaring a son of Emperor Xiaowen's brother Yuan Xie, Yuan Ziyou, emperor (as Emperor Xiaozhuang). Less than two months after Yuan Zhao was declared emperor, Erzhu had captured Luoyang and put Empress Dowager Hu and Yuan Zhao under arrest. After Empress Dowager Hu tried, unsuccessfully, to defend her actions before Erzhu, Erzhu had her and Yuan Zhao thrown into the Yellow River to drown.

== Legacy ==
Traditional historians treat Yuan Zhao ambiguously, and subsequent Northern Wei emperors never explicitly officially declared whether he was an emperor or not. He was not given an imperial posthumous name or temple name, but neither was his imperial status declared null. The official history of Northern Wei, the Book of Wei, written during the succeeding Northern Qi, did not list Yuan Zhao in its imperial biographies (and indeed, did not have a biography for him or his father at all), listing the events during his brief reign under the biography of Emperor Xiaoming, but used the term beng (崩) to describe his death, a term reserved for the deaths of emperors and empresses.

== Notes ==
Regnal titles
Preceded by Daughter of Emperor Xiaoming	Emperor of Northern Wei; 528	Succeeded by Emperor Xiaozhuang of Northern Wei
