= Empress You =

Empress Feng (died c.late April 499), formally Empress You (幽皇后, literally "the lonely empress"), was an empress of the Xianbei-led Chinese Northern Wei dynasty. She was the second empress of Emperor Xiaowen.

== Early life ==
It is not known when Lady Feng was born. (Note: However, her birth year should be before 476, as Lady Feng was more than 13 years old when she was sent home about a year before Empress Dowager Feng died.) She was a daughter of Feng Xi (馮熙) the Prince of Changli, who was a brother of the powerful Grand Empress Dowager Feng, the wife of Emperor Wencheng and regent over his son Emperor Xianwen and grandson Emperor Xiaowen. (Note: Through her father, she was therefore also a great-granddaughter of the last Northern Yan emperor Feng Hong.) Her mother was Feng Xi's concubine Lady Chang. When she was 13, Grand Empress Dowager Feng selected her and a sister of hers to be Emperor Xiaowen's concubines. Both were favored by Emperor Xiaowen, but her sister soon died of an illness. In c.489, she herself grew ill (maybe of smallpox) and was sent back to her home. (Note: Lady Feng's biographies in both Book of Wei and History of the Northern Dynasties recorded that about a year after she was sent home, Empress Dowager Feng died (in October 490).) She subsequently became a Buddhist nun, but was said to have been sexually immoral during this timespan as well.

On 19 May 493, Lady Feng's younger sister by a different mother (probably Feng Xi's wife Princess Boling), the future Empress Xiaowenfei, became Emperor Xiaowen's empress. Subsequently, Emperor Xiaowen, perhaps through Empress Xiaowenfei, found out that Lady Feng had recovered from her illness, and took her back into the palace as an imperial consort, with the title Zhaoyi of the Left (左昭儀). She became Emperor Xiaowen's favorite again. Because Feng Zhaoyi was Emperor Xiaowen's concubine earlier and was an older sister, she refused to submit to Empress Xiaowenfei and tried to undermine Empress Xiaowenfei's position as an empress, including accusing Empress Xiaowenfei of disobeying Emperor Xiaowen's Sinicization regime. In c.August 496, Emperor Xiaowen deposed Empress Xiaowenfei. On 22 August 497, he created Feng Zhaoyi empress.

== As empress ==
Because Emperor Xiaowen often spent his time on the frontlines battling rival Southern Qi, he was not often at the palace in the capital Luoyang. Empress Feng therefore carried on an affair with her attendant Gao Pusa (高菩薩). With the eunuch Shuang Meng (雙蒙) protecting her, few knew or dared to say anything about the affair. When her attendant Ju Peng (劇彭) tried to counsel her to stop the affair, she would not, and Ju died in fear and anger. At the same time, however, Empress Feng tried to force Emperor Xiaowen's sister Princess Pengcheng (Note: The princess was a widow, after the death of her husband Liu Chengxu (劉承緒).) to marry her brother Feng Su (馮夙). Emperor Xiaowen approved of the marriage; as Princess Pengcheng was unwilling to marry Feng Su, she escaped from Luoyang and sought out Emperor Xiaowen at the frontline, revealing to him Empress Feng's affair with Gao. Emperor Xiaowen was initially unwilling to believe the accusation and kept it secret. But, Empress Feng became nervous and, along with her mother Lady Chang, engaged witches to try to curse Emperor Xiaowen, who was already ill by this time, to death.

However, Emperor Xiaowen did not die, and after he returned to Luoyang in 499, he interrogated Gao and Shuang, and both admitted. He then summoned Empress Feng and confronted her with Gao and Shuang's testimony—at an interrogation that no one else other than himself was at. After he finished the interrogation, he then summoned his brothers Yuan Xie the Prince of Pengcheng and Yuan Xiang (元詳) the Prince of Beihai, stating to them, "She used to be your sister-in-law, but treat her now as a passerby, and you need not avoid her." (Note: By traditional Chinese custom, a brother-in-law and a sister-in-law may not sit together or speak with each other.) Emperor Xiaowen then stated, "This woman wanted to stick a knife in my ribs. Because she is a daughter of Empress Dowager Wenming's clan, I cannot depose her, but I hope that one day she will find her conscience and kill herself. Do not believe that I have any remaining feelings for her." After the two princes exited, Emperor Xiaowen gave her a final goodbye, indicating that he would not see her again. The concubines still greeted her as empress, but Emperor Xiaowen ordered his crown prince Yuan Ke not to see her again as well. When Emperor Xiaowen sent eunuchs to give her instructions on certain matters, she rebuked the eunuchs, stating that she was an empress and would not take instructions from eunuchs. In anger, Emperor Xiaowen sent a cane to her mother Lady Chang, and Lady Chang was forced to cane Empress Feng herself as punishment.

== Death ==
Later in April that year, Emperor Xiaowen grew seriously ill. On 24 April, he left instructions to Prince of Pengcheng Yuan Xie to force Empress Feng to commit suicide after his own death, but to still bury her with imperial honors to avoid shame to the Feng clan. Emperor Xiaowen told Yuan Xie, "The Empress has long violated the virtues of a woman and has defied the will of Heaven. If she is not dealt with soon, I fear the chaos of the late Han Dynasty will repeat itself. After my death, grant her permission to commit suicide in a separate palace and bury her with the rites due to an Empress, in order to cover up the serious faults of the Feng family." He then died on 26 April, (Note: Emperor Xiaowen's biographies in both Wei Shu and Bei Shi, as well as vol.142 of Zizhi Tongjian, all recorded that he died on the bingwu day of the 4th month of the 23rd year of the Taihe era; Tongjian recorded the year as the 1st year of the Yongyuan era of Xiao Baojuan's reign.) and Yuan Xie sent the palace official Bai Zheng (白整) (Note: According to the Book of Wei, Bai was present when Empress Feng confessed to Emperor Xiaowen. However, Emperor Xiaowen had ordered Bai to stuff his ears with cotton and the emperor had tested Bai to make sure that Bai was effectively deaf, before the empress gave her confession.) to give her poison. Empress Feng refused to drink the poison, stating, "My husband did not make such an order! It is the princes who want to kill me." Bai seized her physically and forced poisonous peppers into her mouth, and she died. She was buried with imperial honors together with her husband. After the funeral rites, when Prince of Xianyang Yuan Xi and others learned of her death, they looked at each other and said, "If there had been no will, we brothers would have devised a plan to get rid of her. How could we allow a woman of questionable character to rule the empire and kill us?"

== Notes ==
Chinese royalty
| Preceded by Empress Feng Qing | Empress of Northern Wei; 497–499 | Succeeded by Empress Yu |
