= Yu Zhong =

Northern Wei regent (462-518)

Yu Zhong (于忠) (462 – 21 April 518), né Wuniuyu Qiannian (勿忸于千年), courtesy name Sixian (思賢), formally Duke Wujing of Lingshou (靈壽武敬公), was an official of the Northern Wei dynasty. He briefly served as a regent during the reign of Emperor Xiaoming.

== Background and early career ==
Wuniuyu Qiannian was born from a line of Northern Wei nobles of Xianbei ethnicity. His great-grandfather Wuniuyu Lidi was one of Northern Wei's most famous generals during the reigns of Emperor Mingyuan and Emperor Taiwu. His father Wuniuyu Lie (勿忸于烈) served as a general during the reigns of Emperor Xiaowen and Emperor Xuanwu.

Wuniuyu Qiannian himself became a low-level official during the regency of Emperor Xiaowen's stepgrandmother, Grand Empress Dowager Feng. Grand Empress Dowager Feng was strict and often punished officials for even minor offenses, but Wuniuyu Zhong was said to be diligent and honest, and was never punished by her. Emperor Xiaowen favored him as well, and steadily promoted him. Emperor Xiaowen also changed his name to Wuniuyu Deng (勿忸于登). In 496, pursuant to Emperor Xiaowen's edict to change Xianbei names to Han names as part of his sinicization campaign, the Wuniuyu clan's name was changed to Yu. Yu Zhong's cousin was Empress Yu, Emperor Xuanwu's first empress.

== Service under Emperor Xuanwu ==
After Emperor Xiaowen's death in 499 and succession by his son Emperor Xuanwu, Yu Deng's father Yu Lie continued to serve in the administration, and Yu Lie soon ran into conflicts with one of the regents, Emperor Xuanwu's uncle Yuan Xi (元禧) the Prince of Xianyang, over Yuan Xi's arrogance and wastefulness, as well as Yuan Xi's use of items that were supposed to be only usable by the emperor. Yu Deng was by this point an attendant of the emperor, and through him, Yu Lie reported Yuan Xian's faults to the emperor, leading to Emperor Xuanwu's relieving Yuan Xi and another uncle, Yuan Xie the Prince of Pengcheng, of their responsibilities in 501. When Yuan Xi planned a rebellion later that year, Yu Deng was involved in protecting Emperor Xuanwu arresting Yuan Xi and his cohorts, and was rewarded for his accomplishments. Emperor Xuanwu also changed his name further to Yu Zhong—with "Zhong" meaning "faithful."

Later that year, Yu Lie died, and Yu Zhong left governmental service to observe the mourning period for his father. However, he was soon recalled to the government, and he soon began to have conflicts with Emperor Xuanwu's uncle Yuan Xiang (元詳) the Prince of Beihai, who had taken over Yuan Xi's responsibilities, as Yuan Xiang had grown corrupt and arrogant. Yuan Xiang therefore ostensibly promoted Yu, but used the promotion to take Yu from positions where he would see the emperor often. After Yuan Xiang was removed by Emperor Xuanwu in 504, Yu appeared to be continually promoted, and in 505 Emperor Xuanwu sent him on a tour of the western provinces to overview their administrative productivity. Throughout the rest of Emperor Xuanwu's reign, his power increased, which at times put him at odds with Emperor Xuanwu's powerful maternal uncle Gao Zhao.

== Service under Emperor Xiaoming ==
Emperor Xuanwu died suddenly in 515. Yu and the official Cui Guang (崔光), without first consulting Emperor Xuanwu's wife Empress Gao (Gao Zhao's niece), quickly declared Emperor Xuanwu's young son, the crown prince Yuan Xu, emperor (as Emperor Xiaoming). When Empress Gao wanted to put Emperor Xiaoming's mother Consort Hu to death, Yu, Cui, the eunuch Liu Teng (劉騰), and the general Hou Gang (侯剛), protected Consort Hu by hiding her. Yu and Cui soon forced Empress Gao to confer regent authorities on Emperor Xuanwu's uncle Yuan Yong the Prince of Gaoyang and Emperor Xiaowen's cousin Yuan Cheng (元澄) the Prince of Rencheng, and when Gao Zhao subsequently returned to the capital Luoyang from a military campaign against rival Liang Dynasty that Emperor Xuanwu had commissioned, Yu and Yuan Yong ambushed him and put him to death. Empress Gao was removed, and Consort Hu became empress dowager.

Yu Zhong, by this point, was in control of the government, and while he was not in name regent, he was effectively the regent, making almost all key decisions. He had himself created the Duke of Changshan. The officials Pei Zhi (裴植) and Guo Zuo (郭祚), who were unhappy about Yu's authoritarian acts, secretly suggested to Yuan Yong to have Yu removed from his post and sent to a province to be governor. Yu heard the news and falsely accused Pei and Guo of crimes. Pei and Guo were executed, and Yu wanted to kill Yuan Yong as well, but Cui refused to agree, and so Yuan Yong was merely removed of his post.

After Yu had effectively served as regent for six months, however, Empress Dowager Hu assumed titular regency, and while she appreciated Yu's saving her life, she also continuously received reports that Yu was abusing his power, and so she had him sent to Ji Province (冀州, modern central Hebei) to serve as governor. Soon, Yu's ducal title was stripped and many of his acts while in power were reversed, but because Empress Dowager Hu remembered what he had done for her, she soon recalled him to the capital and gave him an honorary post, but did not put him in power any more. In 516, she created him the Duke of Lingshou. He died in 518, and while initially, it was proposed that his posthumous name be "Wuchou" (meaning "martial and abusive"), Empress Dowager Hu instead declared it to be "Wujing" (meaning "martial and alert").
