= Empress Gao (Xuanwu) =

Empress Gao Ying (高英) (died 14 November 518) was an empress of the Xianbei-led Chinese Northern Wei dynasty. She was the second empress of Emperor Xuanwu.

== Biography ==
She was the daughter of Gao Yan (高偃), a younger brother of Emperor Xuanwu's mother Consort Gao Zhaorong (posthumously honored as Empress Wenzhao), making them cousins. It is not clear when she became his concubine, but it was likely after he already had his first empress, Empress Yu, in 501. Once she became a consort, she was said to have gained his favor. Her uncle Gao Zhao was a powerful official, and it was believed, when Empress Yu died in 507, and Empress Yu's son Yuan Chang (元昌) died in 508, that she and/or Gao Zhao were involved, although there is no conclusive evidence.

She was created empress in 508 to replace Empress Yu. She was said to be extremely jealous, and few imperial consorts were able to have sexual relations with the emperor. She herself bore him a son who died early, and a daughter, later created the Princess Jiande. In 510, however, Emperor Xuanwu's concubine Consort Hu bore him a son, Yuan Xu (元詡), and because Emperor Xuanwu had apparently lost sons before in addition to Yuan Chang and Empress Gao's son, he decided to raise his son by choosing wet nurses who had experience raising many of their own children, and refused to let either Empress Gao or Consort Hu near the child. In 512, Emperor Xuanwu created Yuan Xu crown prince.

In 515, Emperor Xuanwu grew ill, and died just three days later. He was succeeded by Crown Prince Xu (as Emperor Xiaoming), who was then only five. In the aftermath of Emperor Xuanwu's death, Empress Gao wanted to put Consort Hu to death, but Consort Hu was protected by the eunuchs Liu Teng (劉騰) and Hou Gang (侯剛) and the officials Yu Zhong and Cui Guang (崔光), and thus was not killed.

The officials were largely opposed to having Gao Zhao, who was then prime minister but was commanding an army in attacking rival Liang dynasty's Yi Province (modern Sichuan and Chongqing), be regent, and forced Empress Gao to instead authorize Emperor Xuanwu's uncles Yuan Yong the Prince of Gaoyang and Yuan Cheng (元澄) the Prince of Rencheng serve as regents. She was honored as empress dowager. Once Gao Zhao arrived back at the capital, however, he was quickly arrested and killed by the imperial princes, and Empress Dowager Gao was stripped of her title and forced to Yaoguang Temple (瑤光寺) to be a Buddhist nun. She was not allowed into the palace except for major festivals. Subsequently, Emperor Xiaoming's mother Consort Hu was honored as empress dowager and assumed regency. (Empress Gao's daughter Princess Jiande escaped any ill treatment, however, as Empress Dowager Hu liked her greatly.)

In 518, there was an occasion where the former Empress Dowager Gao was visiting her mother, the Lady Wuyi. At that time, there were astronomical anomalies that court astrologers believed to correspond to ill fortune for the empress dowager. Empress Dowager Hu decided that she could deflect the ill fortune onto Empress Dowager Gao, and therefore had her murdered—but the method of the murder is lost to history. She was buried with ceremony due a Buddhist nun, although the high-level officials attended the ceremony.

Chinese royalty
Preceded by Empress Yu	Empress of Northern Wei; 508–515	Succeeded by Empress Hu
