= 532 =

Calendar year

532 in various calendars
Gregorian calendar	532; DXXXII
Ab urbe condita	1285
Assyrian calendar	5282
Balinese saka calendar	453–454
Bengali calendar	−62 – −61
Berber calendar	1482
Buddhist calendar	1076
Burmese calendar	−106
Byzantine calendar	6040–6041
Chinese calendar	辛亥年 (Metal Pig); 3229 or 3022 — to — 壬子年 (Water Rat); 3230 or 3023
Coptic calendar	248–249
Discordian calendar	1698
Ethiopian calendar	524–525
Hebrew calendar	4292–4293
- Hindu calendars
Vikram Samvat	588–589
Shaka Samvat	453–454
Kali Yuga	3632–3633
Holocene calendar	10532
Iranian calendar	90 BP – 89 BP
Islamic calendar	93 BH – 92 BH
Javanese calendar	419–420
Julian calendar	532; DXXXII
Korean calendar	2865
Minguo calendar	1380 before ROC 民前1380年
Nanakshahi calendar	−936
Seleucid era	843/844 AG
Thai solar calendar	1074–1075
Tibetan calendar	ལྕགས་མོ་ཕག་ལོ་ (female Iron-Boar); 658 or 277 or −495 — to — ཆུ་ཕོ་བྱི་བ་ལོ་ (male Water-Rat); 659 or 278 or −494

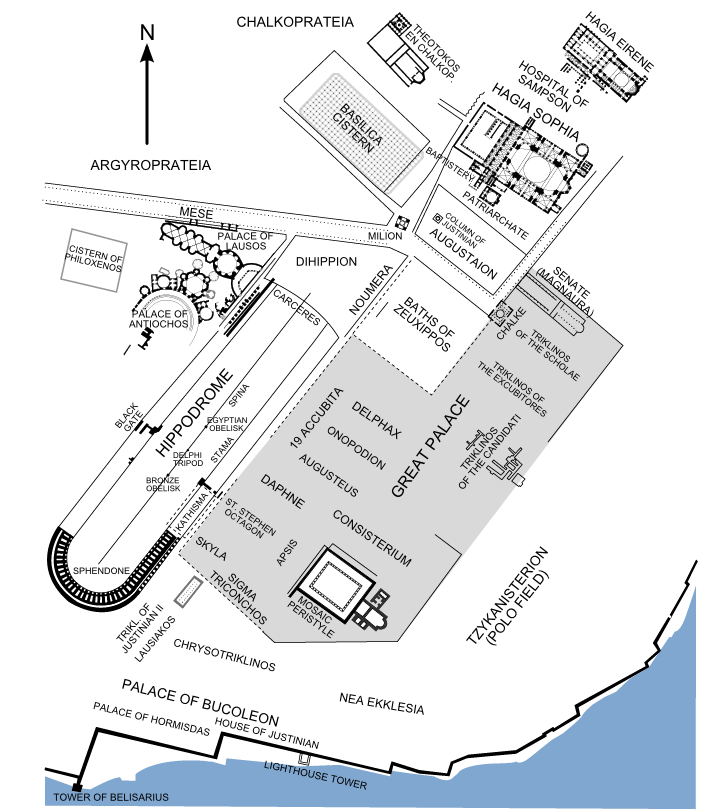
Nika riots in the Hippodrome of Constantinople

Year 532 (DXXXII) was a leap year starting on Thursday of the Julian calendar. At the time, it was known as the Second year after the Consulship of Lampadius and Probus (or, less frequently, year 1285 Ab urbe condita). The denomination 532 for this year has been used since the early medieval period, when the Anno Domini calendar era became the prevalent method in Europe for naming years.

== Events ==
=== By place ===
==== Byzantine Empire ====
- January 11 – Nika riots in Constantinople: Anger among the supporters of the most important chariot teams—the Blues and the Greens—escalates into violence towards the emperor. For the next five days the capital is in chaos. The fires that start during the tumult result in the destruction of much of the city. The insurrection is put down a week later by Belisarius and Mundus; 30,000 people are killed in the Hippodrome.
- February 23 – Emperor Justinian I orders the building of a new Orthodox Christian basilica in Constantinople – the Hagia Sophia. He chooses Isidore of Miletus and Anthemius of Tralles as architects. The material for the construction is brought from all over the empire, such as large stones from quarries in Porphyry, Egypt. More than 10,000 people are employed.
- September – Justinian I signs a peace treaty, the "Eternal Peace", with the Persian king Khosrau I, ending the Iberian War (527-531). Both sides agree to return all occupied territories, and Justinian makes a one-off payment of 110 centenaria (11,000 pounds of gold), as a contribution to the defense of the Caucasus passes.

==== Europe ====
- Battle of Autun - The Franks, under command of King Childebert I and his brother Chlothar I, invade the Kingdom of Burgundy. They defeat the Burgundians under King Godomar near Autun (modern France).

==== Asia ====
- An Ding Wang commits suicide, and is succeeded by Xiao Wu Di as Chinese emperor of Northern Wei.
- Silla conquers the city-state of Geumgwan Gaya (Korea) during the Three Kingdoms period.

=== By topic ===
==== Arts and sciences ====
- First year in which the Anno Domini calendar is used for numbering the years.

==== Religion ====
- October 17 – Pope Boniface II dies in Rome after a tenure of two years, four months and six days.

== Births ==
- Áedán mac Gabráin, king of Dál Riata (Scotland) (approximate date)
- Guntram, king of Burgundy (approximate date)
- Marius Aventicensis, bishop of Aventicum (d. 596)
- Xiao Mohe, general of the Chen dynasty and Sui dynasty (d. 604)

== Deaths ==
- March 3 – Winwaloe, saint and founder of Landévennec Abbey (b.c. 460)
- October 17 – Pope Boniface II
- An Ding Wang, emperor of Northern Wei (b. 513)
- Chang Guang Wang, emperor of Northern Wei
- Ecclesius, bishop of Ravenna (approximate date)
- Erzhu Shilong, official of Northern Wei (b. 500)
- Erzhu Tianguang, general of Northern Wei (b. 496)
- Guntheuc, princess of Burgundy (approximate date)
- Hypatius, Byzantine nobleman (executed)
- Jie Min Di, emperor of Northern Wei (b. 498)
- Pompeius, Byzantine politician (executed)
- Sabbas the Sanctified, monk and saint (b. 439)
