= Empress Erzhu =

Empress Erzhu may refer to the following Xianbei empresses of the Northern Wei dynasty:

- Elder Lady Erzhu (died 556), wife of Yuan Ziyou (Emperor Xiaozhuang), daughter of Erzhu Rong
- Young Lady Erzhu (fl. 530–533), wife of Yuan Ye, daughter of Erzhu Zhao
- Empress Erzhu (Yuan Gong's wife) (fl. 532), wife of Yuan Gong (Emperor Jiemin), daughter of Erzhu Zhao
