= Young Lady Erzhu =

Empress Erzhu (爾朱皇后) (personal name unknown) was briefly an empress of the Xianbei-led Northern Wei dynasty of China. Her husband was Yuan Ye, also known as the Prince of Changguang. To distinguish her from Erzhu Rong's daughter, she's also referred to as Young Lady Erzhu (小尔朱氏), while Erzhu Rong's daughter is referred to as Elder Lady Erzhu (大尔朱氏). In addition, to further distinguish her from her sister who married Emperor Jiemin of Northern Wei, she's also known as Empress Jianming (建明皇后), "Jianming" being the era name of her husband's brief reign.

Empress Erzhu was the daughter of Erzhu Zhao, the nephew of Northern Wei's paramount general Erzhu Rong. In 530, Emperor Xiaozhuang, suspecting Erzhu Rong of plotting a coup, ambushed and killed him, and Erzhu Rong's relatives rose in rebellion. They declared Yuan Ye the Prince of Changguang, a distant member of the imperial clan, emperor, probably because Yuan Ye's aunt was Erzhu Rong's wife the Princess Beixiang. It is not known whether Empress Erzhu was already married to Yuan Ye by this point, but in any case he created her empress. In 531, after the Erzhus had defeated and killed Emperor Xiaozhuang, they concluded that Yuan Ye was too distant from the lineage of recent emperors, being the grandson of Emperor Wencheng's brother Yuan Zhen (元禎) the Prince of Nan'an, and they deposed him and replaced him with Yuan Gong the Prince of Guangling, who took the throne as Emperor Jiemin. During the reign of Emperor Jiemin, Yuan Ye was treated with respect and created the Prince of Donghai, so Empress Erzhu presumably would have carried the title of Princess of Donghai. However, Yuan Ye was subsequently forced to commit suicide in 532 after Emperor Jiemin and the Erzhus were overthrown by a coalition led by the general Gao Huan and replaced with Emperor Xiaowu.

At a point unknown subsequent to Yuan Ye's death, the former Empress Erzhu became a concubine of Gao Huan, who became the paramount general of Northern Wei and its branch state Eastern Wei after Northern Wei's division into Eastern Wei and Western Wei in 534. She had one son with Gao Huan: Gao Jie (高湝), later created the Prince of Rencheng during Northern Qi. Soon after giving birth, however, she had an affair with Gao Huan's brother Gao Chen (高琛) the Duke of Zhao Commandery. After the affair was discovered, Gao Huan killed Gao Chen by caning, and while he did not kill Lady Erzhu, he had her relocated to Ling Province (靈州, roughly modern Yinchuan, Ningxia). At some point, probably after Gao Huan's death, she was allowed to marry Lu Jingzhang (盧景璋), of whom nothing is known in history other than his place of origin. It is not known when she died.

Chinese royalty
Preceded by Elder Lady Erzhu	Empress of Northern Wei; 530–531	Succeeded by Empress Erzhu (Yuan Gong's wife)
