= Husi Chun =

Chinese general (495–537)

Husi Chun (Chinese: 斛斯椿) (495 – c.May 537), courtesy name Fashou (法壽), Xianbei name Daidun (貸敦), formally Prince Wenxuan of Changshan (常山文宣王), was a general and official of the Xianbei-led Northern Wei and Western Wei dynasties of China.

== Early career ==
Husi Chun was a Xianbeified Chile, and his ancestors were tribal chiefs under Northern Wei's predecessor state Dai. During the reign of Emperor Xiaoming, Husi Chun's father Husi Zu (斛斯足) was one of the directors of husbandry—a mid-low level office in the imperial administration. At that time, Northern Wei was greatly affected by agrarian rebellions, and Husi Chun decided to take his household to follow the general Erzhu Rong. He served with distinction under Erzhu, showing tactical talent, and Erzhu made him a close associate. He participated in Erzhu's later plot with Emperor Xiaoming to try to overthrow Emperor Xiaoming's mother and regent Empress Dowager Hu. After Emperor Xiaoming's plot was discovered by Empress Dowager Hu in 528, Empress Dowager Hu poisoned Emperor Xiaoming to death and made his distant nephew, the toddler Yuan Zhao, emperor. Erzhu, with Husi serving as one of his advisors, refused to recognize Yuan Zhao as emperor and instead marched on the capital Luoyang, capturing it. He threw Empress Dowager Hu and Yuan Zhao into the Yellow River to drown, and installed Yuan Ziyou the Prince of Changle as emperor. For Husi's contributions to the campaign, he was created the Duke of Yangqu, and later was made the governor of Eastern Xu Province (東徐州, part of modern Xuzhou, Jiangsu).

In 530, Emperor Xiaozhuang, believing that Erzhu Rong would eventually seize the throne, ambushed and killed him. The members of Erzhu Rong's clan, led by his wife the Princess Beixiang, his cousin Erzhu Shilong, and his nephew Erzhu Zhao, waged a campaign against Emperor Xiaozhuang. During this campaign, rival Liang Dynasty's Emperor Wu created the Wei prince Yuan Yue (元悅) the Prince of Ru'nan, a son of Emperor Xiaowen, the Prince of Wei, and commissioned an army to escort him back to Northern Wei to try to take the throne. Husi, who was fearful after Erzhu Rong's death, decided to surrender to Yuan Yue, and Yuan Yue made him his commander in chief. Later that year, however, after the Erzhus captured and killed Emperor Xiaozhuang, Yuan Yue believed that he would be unable to contend with them, and therefore retreated back to Liang. Instead of following Yuan Yue to Liang, Husi fled and submitted to Erzhu Zhao.

== Involvement in the destruction of the Erzhus ==
In spring 531, Husi Chun participated in Erzhu Shilong's plot to depose Yuan Ye (a distant member of the imperial Yuan clan and Princess Beixiang's nephew, whom the Erzhus had declared emperor during the war against Emperor Xiaozhuang to compete with Emperor Xiaozhuang) and make Yuan Gong the Prince of Guangling, a grandson of Emperor Xianwen, emperor instead (as Emperor Jiemin), and for that participation was created the greater title of Duke of Chengyang. Husi, who became convinced that Erzhu Zhao was being overly violent and autocratic, tried to ask, along with Heba Sheng, Erzhu Shilong to try to persuade Erzhu Zhao to change his ways. Erzhu Shilong refused and was displeased with the advice. He wanted to kill Husi, but Erzhu Tianguang, another prominent member of the Erzhu clan, interceded and saved Husi.

In summer 531, the general Gao Huan, believing the Erzhus to have lost popularity by their corruption, declared a rebellion, and when the Erzhu forces converged to fight him, Gao spread rumors effectively to cause the Erzhus to suspect each other of treachery. During an attempt by Erzhu Shilong's brother Erzhu Zhongyuan to try to persuade Erzhu Zhao of good faith, Erzhu Zhongyuan sent Husi and Heba to Erzhu Zhao's camp to explain, and Erzhu Zhao detained them and wanted to kill them. Only with much pleading from both did Erzhu Zhao spare them.

After Husi and Heba returned to Luoyang, however, they began to have second thoughts about continuing to follow the Erzhus. In 532, Husi and Heba planned to have the Erzhus converge, so that they could all be destroyed at the same time—and they persuaded Erzhu Shilong to demand Erzhu Tianguang (who, as of that point, had not engaged himself into the campaign against Gao) to join them in the campaign. Subsequently, Gao defeated the combined forces of the Erzhus, and after the Erzhus' defeat, Husi and the generals Jia Xiandu (賈顯度) and Jia Xianzhi (賈顯智) quickly arrived back at Luoyang first and declared a revolt against the Erzhus, killing Erzhu Shilong and Erzhu Shilong's brother Erzhu Yanbo (爾朱彥伯), while capturing Erzhu Tianguang and another member of the Erzhu clan, Erzhu Dulü, delivering them to Gao. Gao had them beheaded.

Gao, who had declared another distant member of the Yuan clan, Yuan Lang, emperor during his rebellion against the Erzhus, now believed that due to Yuan Lang's lineage, distant from recent emperors, he was not suitable to be emperor. He flirted with the ideas of allowing Emperor Jiemin to remain emperor or making Yue Yue, whom he welcomed back from Liang, emperor, but ultimately rejected both ideas. Instead, he had Husi seek out Emperor Xiaowen's grandson Yuan Xiu the Prince of Pingyang to offer him the throne. After some persuasion by Husi and Gao, Yuan Xiu accepted the throne (as Emperor Xiaowu).

== Under Emperors Xiaowu and Wen ==
Emperor Xiaowu came to trust Husi Chun quickly and entrusted much governmental responsibility to him. Meanwhile, Husi Chun heard that Gao Huan executed two generals—Qiao Ning (喬寧) and Zhang Ziqi (張子期) -- accusing them of having first serving the Erzhus and then betraying them. Because he himself followed that pattern, he feared that he would be next, and therefore he, along with Emperor Xiaowu's close associate Wang Sizheng, suggested Emperor Xiaowu to try to find ways to free himself of Gao's grip on power. Under Husi's suggestion, Emperor Xiaowu tried to rebuild the imperial army, selecting the best soldiers for the army. Also under his suggestion, Emperor Xiaowu endeared himself to the general Heba Yue (Heba Sheng's brother), who controlled the western provinces, and further commissioned Heba Sheng with the command of the southern provinces, intending to depend on the Hebas to resist Gao.

In spring 534, after Gao persuaded Heba Yue's lieutenant Houmochen Yue to assassinate Heba Yue, Heba Yue's assistant Yuwen Tai took over Heba Yue's army and defeated Houmochen Yue, who committed suicide. With Husi encouraging him, Emperor Xiaowu fostered a relationship with Yuwen, planning to attack Gao with him and Heba Sheng. Gao, hearing the news, marched on Luoyang, and initially, Husi advocated resisting Gao militarily while waiting for reinforcement from Yuwen and Heba Sheng, but Emperor Xiaowu, agreeing with Wang Sizheng that the imperial army was not strong enough to resist Gao's, chose to flee west to Yuwen's territory instead, reestablishing the imperial government at Yuwen's headquarters in Chang'an. Husi followed him. Gao declared Emperor Xiaowu's distant nephew Yuan Shanjian emperor (as Emperor Xiaojing), effectively dividing the empire into Eastern Wei (with Emperor Xiaojing as emperor) and Western Wei (with Emperor Xiaowu still ruling).

Emperor Xiaowu awarded Husi's faithfulness with the greater title of Duke of Changshan and also promoted his official rank. Soon, however, Emperor Xiaowu had a fallout with Yuwen, over Yuwen's refusal to condone his incestuous relationships with his cousins and killing of one of those cousins that he had an affair with, Yuan Mingyue (元明月) the Princess Pingyang. Around the new year 535, Yuwen poisoned him to death and declared his cousin Yuan Baoju the Prince of Nanyang (the Princess Pingyang's brother) emperor (as Emperor Wen). Husi continued to serve Emperor Wen in an honorary role, but did not appear to wield much actual power, which largely rested in Yuwen's hands. He died in 537. He was given the rare honor of having the emperor personally attend his wake, and he was posthumously awarded the title of Prince of Changshan.
