= Empress Gao (Xiaowu) =

Empress Gao (高皇后, personal name unknown) was an empress of the Xianbei-led Northern Wei dynasty of China. Her husband was Emperor Xiaowu.

She was the oldest daughter of the paramount general Gao Huan. Gao Huan had overthrown the Erzhu clan (members of the clan of Erzhu Rong who had overthrown Emperor Xiaozhuang after Emperor Xiaozhuang killed Erzhu Rong in 530) in 532 and deposed Emperor Jiemin, making Emperor Xiaowu emperor instead. Around the new year 533, Emperor Xiaowu married her as his empress.

The relationship between Emperor Xiaowu and Gao soon deteriorated, as Emperor Xiaowu, wanting to assert his authority, grew increasingly distant from Gao and tried to befriend the independent generals Yuwen Tai, who controlled the western provinces of the empire, and Heba Sheng, who controlled the southern provinces, to counter Gao. In 534, believing Emperor Xiaowu to be on the cusp of taking coordinated action with Yuwen and Heba, Gao marched on the capital Luoyang to try to reassert control over the imperial government. Emperor Xiaowu, believing himself to be unable to withstand a Gao attack, fled to Yuwen's domain. Empress Gao did not follow him, but no formal divorce was ever proclaimed by either side, and Emperor Xiaowu did not create another empress. Gao subsequently declared Emperor Xiaowu's distant nephew Yuan Shanjian the Heir Apparent of Qinghe emperor (as Emperor Xiaojing), creating the split between Eastern Wei (with Emperor Xiaojing as its emperor) and Western Wei. Around the new year 535, Yuwen, whose own relationship with Emperor Xiaowu had deteriorated after he refused to condone Emperor Xiaowu's incestuous relationships with his cousins and had killed Yuan Mingyue (元明月) the Princess Pingyuan, who was having a relationship with Emperor Xiaowu, poisoned Emperor Xiaowu to death. When news of Emperor Xiaowu's death reached Eastern Wei, a debate occurred as to whether he should be officially mourned, and the turning issue of the debate toward the eventual decision to mourn him was that no divorce was ever declared between him and Empress Gao.

Later in 535, Gao Huan had the former Empress Gao marry Emperor Xiaozhuang's nephew Yuan Shao (元韶; also a grandson of Yuan Xie) the Prince of Pengcheng, and she therefore carried the title of Princess of Pengcheng. He gave both Yuan Shao much of the Northern Wei imperial treasure as dowry. Because of Yuan Shao's status as Gao Huan's son-in-law (a status he shared with Emperor Xiaojing), he received a number of high positions during the reign of Emperor Xiaojing. In 550, after Gao Huan's son Gao Yang seized the throne from Emperor Xiaojing, ending Eastern Wei and establishing Northern Qi (as its Emperor Wenxuan), Yuan Shao continued to have high positions in government, but his title was reduced to Duke of Pengcheng. In 559, Emperor Wenxuan, believing that the Northern Wei imperial Yuan clan still posed a threat to him, carried out a massacre of members of the Yuan clan, and during the massacre, Yuan Shao was starved to death. It is not known whether the former empress was still alive by this point, however, as no record of her death is available in history.

Chinese royalty
Preceded by Empress Erzhu	Empress of Northern Wei (Eastern); 533–534	Succeeded by Empress Gao (Eastern Wei) of Eastern Wei
Preceded by Empress Erzhu	Empress of Northern Wei (Western); 533–534	Succeeded by Empress Yifu of Western Wei
