= Yuan Lang =

Yuan Lang 元朗

Emperor of Northern Wei
- Reign: 31 October 531 – 6 June 532
- Predecessor: Emperor Jiemin
- Successor: Emperor Xiaowu
- Born: 513
- Died: 26 December 532
Names
- Family name: Yuán (元); Given name: Lǎng (朗)
Era name and dates
- Zhōngxīng (中興): 531-532
- House: Yuan
- Dynasty: Northern Wei

Yuan Lang (Chinese: 元朗) (c. 513 – 26 December 532), courtesy name Zhongzhe (仲哲), frequently known by his post-deposition title Prince of Anding (安定王), at times known in historiography as Emperor Houfei (後廢帝, "later deposed emperor"), was briefly an emperor of the Xianbei-led Chinese Northern Wei dynasty. He was proclaimed emperor by the general Gao Huan, who rebelled against the clan of the paramount general Erzhu Rong in 531, as a competing candidate for the imperial throne against Emperor Jiemin, who had been made emperor by Erzhu Rong's cousin Erzhu Shilong. In 532, after Gao's victory over the Erzhus, he believed Yuan Lang, whose lineage was distant from the recent emperors, to be unsuitable to be emperor, and instead made Yuan Xiu (Emperor Xiaowu) emperor. Emperor Xiaowu created Yuan Lang the Prince of Anding, but later that year put him to death.

== Background ==
Yuan Lang was born in 513, as the third son of Yuan Rong (元融) the Prince of Zhangwu, a key official in the Northern Wei imperial government who was a distant relative of the then-reigning Emperor Xuanwu. His mother was Lady Cheng. (It is unclear whether she was Yuan Rong's wife or concubine.) In 526, while fighting the agrarian rebel leader Ge Rong, Yuan Rong was killed in battle, and Yuan Lang's older brother Yuan Jingzhe (元景哲) inherited the title of Prince of Zhangwu. Yuan Lang was said to be intelligent in his youth.

In 529, at age 16, Yuan Lang became an army officer, serving on the staff of Yuan Su (元肅) the Prince of Lu Commandery, who was the governor of Si Province (肆州, roughly modern Xinzhou, Shanxi). In spring 531, he became the governor of Bohai Commandery (勃海, in modern Cangzhou, Hebei).

At the time that Yuan Lang became the governor of Bohai Commandery, the imperial government was dominated by members of the paramount general Erzhu Rong, who, after Emperor Xiaozhuang had killed Erzhu Rong in 530, overthrew and killed Emperor Xiaozhuang, installing Yuan Ye and Emperor Jiemin successively. In summer 531, the general Gao Huan, believing the Erzhus to be corrupt and to have lost the support of the people, rose in rebellion at Xindu (信都, in modern Hengshui, Hebei), and while initially he claimed to be merely wanting to overthrow the Erzhus and still recognizing Emperor Jiemin, he soon, at the urging of his general Sun Teng (孫騰), came to believe that he needed to have an emperor under his control who could issue edicts as he wished. In winter 531, he therefore declared Yuan Lang, whose Bohai Commandery was under his control by that point, emperor, even though Yuan Lang's lineage was distant from that of recent emperors and was not even an imperial prince himself.

== Reign ==
There is little evidence that the 18-year-old Yuan Lang exerted any real influence on Gao Huan's policy decisions as he battled the Erzhus. He initially remained at Xindu, but after Gao captured the important city Yecheng (鄴城, in modern Handan, Hebei) in spring 532, Yuan Lang was placed in Yecheng.

Gao soon prevailed in a major battle against the joined forces of Erzhu Zhao, Erzhu Tianguang, Erzhu Dulü, and Erzhu Zhongyuan, and in light of Gao's victory, the general Husi Chun rebelled at the capital Luoyang and executed the prime minister Erzhu Shilong and Erzhu Shilong's brother Erzhu Yanbo (爾朱彥伯), delivering their heads, as well as Erzhu Tiangguang and Erzhu Dulü, whom Husi captured, to Gao. Erzhu Zhao fled back to his domain, while Erzhu Zhongyuan fled to rival Liang Dynasty.

The victorious Gao, along with Yuan Lang, approached Luoyang. Gao, now believing that Yuan Lang's lineage was too distant, making him an inappropriate choice for emperor, initially considered still permitting Emperor Jiemin to remain on the throne, but after his generals Wei Lan'gen (魏蘭根) and Cui Ling (name not in Unicode) persuaded him that Emperor Jiemin would be difficult to control, imprisoned Emperor Jiemin, while instead deciding on making Yuan Xiu the Prince of Pingyang, a grandson of Emperor Xiaowen, emperor. Gao then forced Yuan Lang to yield the throne to Yuan Xiu, who took the throne as Emperor Xiaowu.

== Death ==
Emperor Xiaowu created Yuan Lang the Prince of Anding in c.June 532. However, in winter 532, about six and a half months after taking the throne, Emperor Xiaowu ordered Yuan Lang to commit suicide. Yuan Lang was buried without imperial honor, but it is not clear whether he was buried with any honor or not. Eventually, Yuan Lang's son Yuan Huangtou was permitted to inherit the title of Prince of Anding. After Northern Wei's branch successor state Eastern Wei ended and was replaced by Northern Qi, its first emperor Emperor Wenxuan of Northern Qi carried out a major slaughter of Northern Wei's imperial Yuan clan in 559. One of the victims was mentioned as one of his close associates Yuan Huangtou, who was starved to death, but it is not known for sure whether that Yuan Huangtou was Yuan Lang's son.

== Family ==
=== Sons ===
- Yuan Huangtou, Prince Anping (安平王 元黃頭; d. 559)

Regnal titles
Preceded by Emperor Jiemin of Northern Wei	Emperor of Northern Wei (Northern); 531–532	Succeeded by Emperor Xiaowu of Northern Wei
