= Erzhu Dulü =

Northern Wei general (died 532)

- 爾朱度律

Grand General (大將軍)
- In office 531–532
- Monarch: Emperor Jiemin of Northern Wei

Personal details
- Born: Unknown Shuozhou, Shanxi
- Died: 532 Luoyang, Henan
- Relations: Erzhu Rong (cousin)
- Parent: Lady Shan (mother)
- Peerage: Prince of Changshan

Erzhu Dulü (died 532) was a military general of the Northern Wei during the Northern and Southern dynasties. He was one of Erzhu Rong's cousins, and together with his other cousin, Erzhu Shilong, they were entrusted in defending the capital, Luoyang. While described as reserved and not as cruel as most of his other cousins, he was still criticized for being greedy and bringing hardship to the common people. After the defeat of the Erzhu clan to Gao Huan in 532, he and Erzhu Tianguang were killed by pursuing troops while attempting to return to Luoyang.

== Life ==
=== Early career ===
Erzhu Dulü was a member of the Erzhu clan of Xiurong (秀容, in modern Shuozhou, Shanxi). The Book of Wei describes him as a unsophisticated and close-mouthed. He served as a commander under his cousin, Erzhu Rong when he raised an army to suppress the rebellion of the Six Garrisons. During the early reign of Emperor Xiaozhuang around 528 to 529, he was appointed General Who Pacifies the West and Household Counsellor, along with the title of Founding Earl of Lexiang County. Soon after, he was transferred to General Who Pacifies the North and Inspector of Shuo province. Later, he was appointed as a Palace Attendant and General of the Right Guard, which was later changed to General of the Guard, Left Household Counsellor and Grand Chief Controller of the Capital.

However, under his watch, on 1 November 530, Erzhu Rong was ambushed and assassinated by Emperor Xiaozhuang, prompting Dulü to flee to Jinyang with his joint commander, Erzhu Shilong. On 5 December, Dulü and Shilong recommended the Prince of Changguang, Yuan Ye to take the throne. Dulü was made Grand Commandant, Grand Chief Controller of the Four Frontiers and granted the title of Prince of Changshan. In 531, he and Erzhu Zhao attacked Luoyang, capturing and killing Emperor Xiaozhuang.

After overthrowing Emperor Xiaozhuang, Erzhu Zhao left Erzhu Dulü and others to guard Luoyang while he march north to defeat the emperor's loyalist, Hedouling Bufan. In his absence, Erzhu Shilong installed Emperor Jiemin to the throne, and under him, Erzhu Dulü was promoted to Palace Attendant, Grand General and Grand Commandant while concurrently serving as Prefect of the Masters of Writing and Branch Censorate of the Northeastern Circuits.

=== Battle of Guang'a ===
Later in 531, the general, Gao Huan rose up in rebellion against the Erzhu clan at Xindu. Erzhu Dulü left Luoyang with his army and followed Erzhu Shilong's brother, Erzhu Zhongyuan to coalsce with Erzhu Zhao at Yangping (陽平; in present-day Qingfeng County, Henan) and face Gao Huan while Shilong remained at Luoyang. However, Gao exploited the rift between Erzhu Shilong and Erzhu Zhao to sow further discord between the family members by spreading rumours that Erzhu Zhongyuan and Erzhu Zhao were about to attack each other. Erzhu Dulü stood by as Zhongyuan and Zhao began suspecting each other, and after Zhao threatened to execute two of Zhongyuan's subordinates, Husi Chun and Heba Sheng, he withdrew with Zhongyuan in fear. Erzhu Zhao was thus left to fight Gao Huan alone and was defeated at Guang'a (廣阿, in modern Xingtai, Hebei).

Erzhu Dulü was known to be unrestrained in amassing wealth and brought suffering to the people wherever he went. Upon hearing the news of her family's defeat at Guang'a, Dulü's mother, Lady Shan (山氏) fell ill from grief and anger. When Dulü visited her, she scolded him, saying, "You owe the state a favour, yet you rebelled without an ounce of shame. How can I bear to see you all slaughtered?" She died shortly after, and the people at the time found her remark bizarre.

=== Battle of Hanling and death ===
In 532, the Erzhu clan reunited once more to face Gao Huan, and Erzhu Dulü brought his army to join them at Ye. However, despite their numerical superiority, the family was badly defeated by Gao Huan at Hanling (韩陵; northeast of present-day Anyang, Henan). Dulü returned to Luoyang with his cousin, Erzhu Tianguang, but Husi Chun, who defected to Gao Huan, blocked their path by seizing control over Heqiao (河穚; southwest of present-day Mengzhou, Henan). Dulü and Tianguang planned to attack him, but heavy rain poured continuously day and night, exhausting their men and horses. As their bows and arrows were rendered useless by the rain, they retreated westward but were captured by pursuers at Leibojin (灅波津; east of present-day Mengjin, Henan). Husi Chun took them captive and handed them over to Gao Huan, who then returned them to Luoyang to be executed by beheading.

== Sources ==
- Book of Wei
- History of the Northern Dynasties
- Zizhi Tongjian
- Lü, Simian (1948), A History of Jin, Northern and Southern Dynasties 两晋南北朝史, vol. 1, Shanghai: Kaiming Press
