= Erzhu Zhongyuan =

Northern Wei general

- 爾朱仲遠

Inspector of Xu province (徐州刺史)
- In office 531–532
- Monarch: Emperor Jiemin of Northern Wei

Personal details
- Born: Unknown Shuozhou, Shanxi
- Died: Unknown
- Relations: Erzhu Yanbo (brother); Erzhu Shilong (brother); Erzhu Rong (cousin)
- Parent: Erzhu Maizhen (father)
- Peerage: Prince of Henan

Erzhu Zhongyuan (fl.528–532) was an official and military general of the Northern Wei during the Northern and Southern dynasties period. He was the brother of Erzhu Shilong and cousin of Erzhu Rong. When the Erzhu clan seized control of the government, he was placed in charge of governing the southeastern provinces. Among Erzhu Rong's relatives, Zhongyuan was known to be an exceptionally corrupt official who was willing to kill his subjects in pursuit of wealth and engage in sexual misdeeds. After the defeat of the Erzhu clan in 532, he was able to escape with his life by fleeing to the Liang dynasty, where he remained until his death.

== Life ==
=== Early career ===
Erzhu Zhongyuan was the brother Erzhu Yanbo and Erzhu Shilong, as well as a cousin of the general, Erzhu Rong. He was knoweldegable in bookkeeping, and as Erzhu Rong garnered prestige for their family by suppressing the Six Garrisons rebellion, he became a prominent minister within the imperial court. Zhongyuan knew how to copy Erzhu Rong's handwriting and was in possession of his seal, which he took advantage of to forge letters of recommendation supposedly from his cousin to get people into official positions. He was thus able to amass a large amount of wealth and used it to fuel his extravagant lifestyle of sex and alcohol.

After the Heyin Incident in 528, Erzhu Rong installed Emperor Xiaozhuang to the throne, and Zhongyuan was appointed Director of the Bedchambers, General of Distant Peace and Colonel of Infantry. Soon, he received a series of new appointments and enfeoffments, eventually reaching the position of Grand Brach Censorate of the Three Xus and the fiefly title of Duke of Qinghe Commandery. Zhongyuan later reported to Emperor Xiaozhuang that the military was understaffed and requested that he be given authority to set up recruiters and appoint new officials to fill the vacancies, which the emperor approved. Thus, Zhongyuan was allowed to freely appoint at his own will and accumulate more wealth for himself.

=== After Erzhu Rong's assassination ===
After Erzhu Rong was assassinated by Emperor Xiaozhuang in 530, Erzhu Zhongyuan brought his forces from Xu province towards Luoyang, captured Western Yan province (西兗州; roughly encompassing parts of Henan and Shandong) and poised to attack Dong Commandery. The emperor ordered the various generals and governors to attack him, but Zhongyuan defeated them all. He also instructed his generals, Zheng Xianhu (鄭先護) and Heba Sheng to repel Zhongyuan, but Zheng refused to cooperate with Heba and left him to fight Zhongyuan on his own. As a result, Heba surrendered, and when the Erzhu forces entered Luoyang, Zheng's troops fled and dispersed.

When Emperor Jiemin ascended the throne in 531, Erzhu Zhongyuan was appointed a Palace Attendant, Chief Controller of military affairs of the Three Xus and Two Yans, Grand General of Agile Cavalry, Minister of the Palace with Equal Rank to the Three Excellencies and Inspector of Xu province, Grand Chief Controller of the Eastern Circuits and Grand Branch Censorate. His fief was also elevated to the Prince of Pengcheng. He was soon promoted to Grand General while concurrently serving as Prefect of the Masters of Writing.

Despite his position in Xu province, he refused to return to his post and camped at Daliang (大梁; present-day Kaifeng, Henan) near the capital instead. Zhongyuan's influence was so immense that on one occasion, when he sent an envoy to Emperor Jiemin requesting permission to perform court ritual and military exercises, the emperor simply glanced at the instructions, smiled and approved. He was further promoted to Chief Controller of the Eastern Circuits and Inspector of Yan province while retaining his other offices.

In addition to his unbridled corruption, Erzhu Zhongyuan was also notorious for his cruelty and lust. He was considered by many at the time to be the most ruthless of Erzhu Rong's retainers and was feared by the officials and common people, who compared his behaviour to a jackal. He would rape the wives of generals that he found attractive and often convict wealthy nobles under false charges, execute them and then seize their property for himself. To destroy the evidence, he had the bodies of the victims he killed dumped into rivers. From Xingyang eastward, taxes were collected by his army and were never sent to the capital.

=== Battle of Guang'a ===
In 531, the Inspector of Jin province, Gao Huan raised an army in rebellion against the Erzhu clan at Xindu. Erzhu Zhongyuan and Erzhu Dulü converged at Yangping (陽平; in present-day Qingfeng County, Henan) to fight Gao, and they were also joined by Erzhu Zhao from Jinyang. Though they have gathered to defeat Gao Huan, Erzhu Zhongyuan and his brothers, especially Erzhu Shilong who was back in Luoyang, were not on good terms with Erzhu Zhao. Gao Huan took advantage of this weakness by spreading a rumour that Shilong and his brothers were planning to kill Zhao, as well as a rumour that Zhao was colluding with Gao to kill Zhongyuan and the rest. The plan was a success, and Zhongyuan and Zhao began suspecting each other.

As their armies refused to advance, Zhongyuan instructed Husi Chun and Heba Sheng to mediate with Erzhu Zhao. However, Zhao went to his camp with 300 cavalrymen, where he cracked his whip, whistled loudly and glared at Zhongyuan, signalling his disapproval. As Zhao rode away, Zhongyuan sent Husi and Heba to pursue him and offer an explanation, but Zhao arrested them and was about to execute them. The incident frightened Erzhu Zhongyuan and Erzhu Dulü that they decided to return south and abandon Erzhu Zhao. Even after Zhao spared Husi and Heba, they refused to turn back, leaving Zhao to fight Gao Huan alone and suffer a defeat at Guang'a (廣阿, in modern Xingtai, Hebei).

=== Battle of Hanling and surrender to Liang ===
In 532, Erzhu Zhongyuan brought his forces from Dong Commandery to join forces with his family members at Ye to oppose Gao Huan once more. However, despite outnumbering Gao's forces, the Erzhu clan was dealt a heavy defeat at the Battle of Hanling, forcing Zhongyuan to flee back to Dong. As Erzhu Shilong, Erzhu Yanbo, Erzhu Tianguang and Erzhu Dulü were all betrayed and killed by their subordinates, Zhongyuan had no choice but to flee south to the Liang dynasty. Gao's Inspector of Xu province, Du De (杜德) led his forces to pursue Zhongyuan, but he was able to cross the border in time and escape. Emperor Wu of Liang awarded him the title of General Who Stabilizes the Luo and the Prince of Henan. His subsequent activities are unknown, and he eventually died in the Jiangnan.

== Sources ==
- Book of Wei
- History of the Northern Dynasties
- Zizhi Tongjian
- Lü, Simian (1948), A History of Jin, Northern and Southern Dynasties 两晋南北朝史, vol. 1, Shanghai: Kaiming Press
