= Emperor Fei =

Emperor Fei or Fèidì is a term for deposed Chinese emperors. It may refer to:

- Marquis of Haihun, Emperor Fei of Han (92–58 BC, r.74 BC)
- Emperor Fei of Jin (342–386, r.365–371)
- Emperor Qianfei of Liu Song (449–465, r.464–465) (Qian means previous)
- Emperor Houfei of Liu Song (463–477, r.472–477) (Hou means later)
- Xiao Baojuan, Emperor Fei of Southern Qi (483–501, r.498–501)
- Emperor Jiemin of Northern Wei, Emperor Qianfei of Northern Wei (498–532, r.531)
- Emperor Fei of Northern Qi (545–561, r.559–560)
- Yuan Lang, Emperor Houfei of Northern Wei (513–532, r.531–532)
- Emperor Fei of Western Wei (died 554, r.554)
- Emperor Fei of Chen (554–570, r.566–568)
- Li Congke, Emperor Fei of Later Tang (887–937, r.934–937)
