= Empress Erzhu (Yuan Gong's wife) =

Empress of Chinese Northern Wei dynasty

Empress Erzhu (爾朱皇后, personal name unknown) was an empress of the Xianbei-led Chinese Northern Wei dynasty. Her husband was Emperor Jiemin, and she was a daughter of the general Erzhu Zhao. To distinguish her from her sister who married Yuan Ye, her sister is referred to as "Empress Jianming" ("Jianming" being the era name of Yuan Ye's reign).

Very little is known about her. Her father Erzhu Zhao had come to prominence after members of the Erzhu clan, avenging the head of the clan Erzhu Rong (Erzhu Zhao's uncle), overthrew Emperor Xiaozhuang in 530. With the general Gao Huan declaring a rebellion in 531 and with the Erzhu camp itself in internal disarray, Erzhu Rong's cousin Erzhu Shilong tried to keep the unity within the clan by persuading Emperor Jiemin to marry her as empress in April 532. Later that year, however, Gao Huan defeated the Erzhus and captured the capital Luoyang, imprisoning Emperor Jiemin and replacing him with Emperor Xiaowu, who then poisoned Emperor Jiemin to death. Erzhu Zhao himself tried to hold out against Gao, but by 533 had been defeated, and he committed suicide. Unlike her older sister, who was Yuan Ye's empress, who is known to have then become Gao's concubine, nothing further is known about Emperor Jiemin's widow.

Chinese royalty
Preceded by Empress Erzhu (Yuan Ye's wife)	Empress of Northern Wei; 532	Succeeded by Empress Gao
