= Xiaowu =

Xiaowu is a given name. Notable people with the name include:

- Emperor Xiaowu of Jin (362–396), an emperor of the Eastern Jin Dynasty (266–420) in China
- Emperor Xiaowu of Liu Song (430–464), an emperor of the Chinese dynasty Liu Song
- Emperor Xiaowu of Northern Wei (510–535), an emperor of the Chinese/Xianbei dynasty Northern Wei
- Empress Gao (Xiaowu), empress of the Chinese/Xianbei dynasty Northern Wei: her husband was Emperor Xiaowu
- Ruan Xiaowu, fictional character in the Water Margin, one of the four Great Classical Novels of Chinese literature
