= Emperor Chu =

Emperor Chu (出帝; Chudi) may refer to:

- Emperor Xiaowu of Northern Wei (510–535), also known as Emperor Chu of Northern Wei
- Shi Chonggui (914–974, reigned 942–946), Emperor Chu of Later Jin, during the Five Dynasties and Ten Kingdoms period
