= Yuan Huangtou =

Northern Wei prince

- Born: China?
- Died: 559; Ye, Northern Qi, China
- Occupation: Prince of Northern Wei
- Father: Yuan Lang

Yuan Huangtou (Chinese: 元黄头; died in 559) was the son of emperor Yuan Lang of Northern Wei dynasty of China. At that time, paramount general Gao Yang took control of the court of Northern Wei's branch successor state Eastern Wei and set the emperor as a puppet. After Gao deposed the last Eastern Wei emperor and established himself as the emperor of Northern Qi, he exterminated the imperial clan of the previous dynasty. Yuan Huangtou was imprisoned by Gao Yang and, along with other prisoners and against his will, flown via a large kite from the tower of Ye. The History of Northern Dynasties and Zizhi Tongjian record that all the condemned kite airmen died except for him. "Gao Yang made Yuan Huangtou and other prisoners take off from the Tower of the Phoenix attached to paper owls. Yuan Huangtou was the only one who succeeded in flying as far as the Purple Way, and there he came to earth." The Purple Way, a road, was 2.5 kilometres from the approximately 33-metre-tall (108 ft) Golden Phoenix Tower.

He survived this flight, but was later executed via starvation within prison.

== See also ==
- List of firsts in aviation
