= Erzhu Tianguang =

Northern Wei general (496–532)

Erzhu Tianguang (simplified Chinese: 尔朱天光; traditional Chinese: 爾朱天光; pinyin: Ěrzhū Tiānguāng) (496 – 29 August 532) was a general of the Xianbei-led Chinese Northern Wei dynasty. He became a major general during the reign of Emperor Xiaozhuang, when his father's cousin Erzhu Rong was the paramount general of the state. He was renowned for pacifying the Guanzhong region, which had been seized by agrarian rebel generals Moqi Chounu and Wang Qingyun (王慶雲) in 530. He thereafter tried to maintain a relatively distant profile from the other Erzhu clan members, particularly after Emperor Xiaozhuang killed Erzhu Rong later in 530 and then was overthrown and killed by Erzhu Rong's nephew Erzhu Zhao and cousin Erzhu Shilong. In 532, after the other Erzhus had suffered defeats at the hand of the rebelling general Gao Huan, Erzhu Tianguang tried to come to their aid, but was also defeated by another general who rebelled, Husi Chun, and Gao executed him.

== Under Erzhu Rong's command ==
Erzhu Tianguang's father was a cousin of Erzhu Rong, who was a Northern Wei general and the chief of the ethnic Xiongnu Qihu (契胡) tribe. In Erzhu Tianguang's youth, he was described to be resolute and capable in archery and horseriding. Erzhu Rong considered him a close confidant, and often discussed military matters with him. In 528, after Emperor Xiaoming was poisoned by his mother Empress Dowager Hu, it was after consulting with Erzhu Tianguang that Erzhu Rong set out to attack the capital Luoyang to overthrow Empress Dowager Hu. As he did, he entrusted one of his home provinces, Si Province (肆州, roughly modern Xinzhou, Shanxi) to Erzhu Tianguang, and after Erzhu Rong killed Empress Dowager Hu and made Emperor Xiaozhuang emperor, Erzhu Tianguang was created the Duke of Chang'an. In 528, when Erzhu Rong set out to destroy the rebel Emperor of Qi, Ge Rong, he entrusted his entire home base, including Bing Province (并州, roughly modern Taiyuan, Shanxi) to Erzhu Tianguang as well, remarking, "Only you can make me feel secure about places where I am not at."

In 529, Erzhu Tianguang was one of the generals under the command of Erzhu Rong's close associate Yuan Tianmu when Yuan Tianmu attacked and defeated the rebel general Xing Gao. At the same time, however, Yuan Hao the Prince of Beihai, who also claimed the throne, was attacking Luoyang with the support of rival Liang Dynasty, and Yuan Tianmu was unable to stop Yuan Hao. Emperor Xiaozhuang fled Luoyang, and Yuan Tianmu and Erzhu Tianguang also fled north with their troops, joining with Erzhu Rong. Erzhu Rong sent Erzhu Tianguang back to Bing and Si Provinces to secure them, before he himself advanced south and defeated Yuan Hao. After Yuan Hao's defeat, Emperor Xiaozhuang created Erzhu Tianguang the greater title of Duke of Guangzong.

In 530, with Moqi Chounu, who had claimed imperial title by that point, attacking and seizing parts of the Guanzhong region, Erzhu Rong was initially going to send the general Heba Yue to command an army against Moqi. However, Heba Yue declined to be in command, believing that he would draw suspicions even if were victorious, and instead offering to serve under a member of the Erzhu clan. Erzhu Rong therefore put Erzhu Tianguang in command of the army, with Heba and Houmochen Yue as Erzhu Tianguang's lieutenants. Erzhu Tianguang was given a relatively small army, and initially the campaign against Moqi appeared hopeless, but with Erzhu Tianguang himself and Heba both being capable generals, they scored initial victories and then misled Moqi into believing that they would rest several months before taking further action. Instead, they made a surprise attack against Moqi, capturing him in battle, and then captured Moqi's capital Gaoping (高平, in modern Guyuan, Ningxia) and Moqi's prime minister Xiao Baoyin. Erzhu Tianguang's follow-up campaign against Moqi Chounu's general Moqi Daoluo (万俟道洛), however, was initially unsuccessful, and Erzhu Rong, in anger, had Emperor Xiaozhuang demote his rank and title to marquess. Erzhu Tianguang, however, was eventually able to force Moqi Daoluo to flee to another rebel general, Wang Qingyun, and then defeated and captured both Moqi Daoluo and Wang.

== Involvement in the campaign against Emperor Xiaozhuang ==
With the Guanzhong region and the surrounding provinces pacified, Erzhu Tianguang was put in charge of those provinces, with his headquarters at Chang'an. His title was restored to duke.

Late in 530, Emperor Xiaozhuang, apprehensive that Erzhu Rong would eventually seized the throne, ambushed him in the palace and killed him. Erzhu Rong's cousin Erzhu Shilong and nephew Erzhu Zhao rebelled, declaring Erzhu Rong's wife Princess Beixiang's nephew Yuan Ye the Prince of Changguang emperor. However, Erzhu Tianguang initially took no corresponding action; rather, when Emperor Xiaozhuang sent his official Zhu Rui (朱瑞) to try to persuade Erzhu Tianguang to join his side, Erzhu Tianguang deliberately made ambiguous gestures, trying to instead encourage Emperor Xiaozhuang to abandon Luoyang and flee, rather than to directly confront the emperor. Both Emperor Xiaozhuang and Yuan Ye conferred princely titles on Erzhu Tianguang, and Erzhu Tianguang eventually accepted Yuan Ye's bestowment of the Prince of Longxi title, but did not make further threatening gestures against Emperor Xiaozhuang. Around the new year 531, Erzhu Zhao made a surprise attack on Luoyang and captured it and Emperor Xiaozhuang, and only then did Erzhu Tianguang go to Luoyang to meet with Erzhu Zhao and Erzhu Shilong, but soon returned to his post at Chang'an.

While Erzhu Tianguang was still at Luoyang, however, he suggested to Erzhu Shilong, who had become concerned that Yuan Ye's lineage was too far from the recent emperors' to be a proper candidate for the throne, to make Emperor Xianwen's grandson Yuan Gong the Prince of Guangling emperor. In spring 531, Erzhu Shilong took such action, forcing Yuan Ye to yield the throne to Yuan Gong, who took the throne as Emperor Jiemin.

== Defeat and death ==
Erzhu Tianguang continued to control the western provinces, and in summer 531 he attacked the rebel general Suqin Mingda (宿勤明達) and captured him, taking Xia Province (夏州, roughly modern Yulin, Shanxi), which Suqin controlled, under his own control, while delivering Suqin to Luoyang to be executed. However, when the general Gao Huan rebelled at Xindu (信都, in modern Hengshui, Hebei) later in the summer, Erzhu Tianguang abandoned his planned campaigns against the rebel generals Gedouling Yili (紇豆陵伊利) and Moqi Shouluogan (万俟受洛干), who controlled the modern central and western Gansu, and prepared for possible action in the east, although he did not immediately intervene in the campaign between Gao and his fellow Erzhu clan members, even after Gao defeated Erzhu Zhao in battle late in 531.

In 532, hoping to force Erzhu Tianguang to come to his clan members' aid so that they could be destroyed together, the generals Husi Chun and Heba Sheng (Heba Yue's brother) persuaded Erzhu Shilong to put pressure on Erzhu Tianguang to act against Gao Huan. Soon, Erzhu Tianguang took his army to converge with Erzhu Zhao, and Erzhu Shilong's brothers Erzhu Dulü and Erzhu Zhongyuan at the important city Yecheng, which Gao had taken earlier in 532. Despite numerical advantage, however, Gao defeated them, and Erzhu Zhao fled back to Jinyang (晉陽, in modern Taiyuan, Shanxi), while Erzhu Zhongyuan fled back to Huatai (滑台, in modern Anyang, Henan). Erzhu Tianguang and Erzhu Dulü retreated toward Luoyang, but Husi rebelled at this time, seizing the fortress of Beizhong (北中, just north of Luoyang across the Yellow River), and when Erzhu Dulü and Erzhu Tianguang failed to recapture Beizhong, they were forced to flee, and they were captured and delivered to Husi, who in turn delivered them, as well as the heads of Erzhu Shilong and Erzhu Shilong's brother Erzhu Yanbo (爾朱彥伯) (whom Husi had earlier captured and executed on 20 May) to Gao. Gao had Erzhu Tianguang and Erzhu Dulü executed in August.

The official history of Northern Wei, the Book of Wei, written during the succeeding Northern Qi (whose imperial family was Gao Huan's descendants), was largely highly critical of the Erzhus, but remarked that Erzhu Tianguang was, unlike the other Erzhu clan members, neither corrupt nor violent, and praised him for his recapturing the western provinces for Northern Wei.
