= Wei Shou =

Chinese historian and author (506–572)

Wei Shou (Chinese: 魏收; pinyin: Wèi Shōu) (506–572), courtesy name Boqi (伯起), was a Chinese author born in Quyang County in Julu Commandery (today Xingtai, Hebei) who served under the Northern Qi dynasty. He wrote the Book of Wei, composed in 554, an important Chinese historical text.

== See also ==
- Twenty-Four Histories
