= Emperor Xiaowu of Northern Wei =

Emperor Xiaowu of Northern Wei 北魏孝武帝

Emperor of Northern Wei
- Reign: June 13, 532 – February 3, 535
- Predecessor: Yuan Lang
- Successor: Emperor Xiaojing (Eastern); Emperor Wen (Western)
- Regent: Gao Huan (532–534); Yuwen Tai (534–535)
- Born: 510
- Died: February 3, 535 (aged 25)
- Consorts: Empress Yongxi
- Issue: Yuan Guangji
Names
- Family name: Yuán (元); Given name: Xiū (脩 or 修)
Era dates
- tài chāng (太昌): 532; yǒng xīng (永興): 532; yǒng xī (永熙): 532–534
Posthumous name
- Emperor Xiàowǔ (孝武皇帝, lit. "filial and martial")
- House: Yuan
- Dynasty: Northern Wei
- Father: Yuan Huai
- Mother: Lady Li

Emperor Xiaowu (Note: In the Twenty-Four Histories, the name "Xiaowu" was not used to refer to Yuan Xiu in Book of Wei; it was first used in Book of the Northern Qi. Later, Zizhi Tongjian also used this posthumous name to refer to him.) of Northern Wei ((北)魏孝武帝) (510 – 3 February 535), personal name Yuan Xiu (元脩 or 元修), courtesy name Xiaoze (孝則), at times known as Emperor Chu (出帝, "the emperor who fled"), was the last emperor of the Xianbei-led Chinese Northern Wei dynasty. After the general Gao Huan rebelled against and defeated the clan of the deceased paramount general Erzhu Rong in 532, he made Emperor Xiaowu emperor. Despite Gao's making him emperor, however, Emperor Xiaowu tried strenuously to free himself from Gao's control, and in 534, he, aligning with the general Yuwen Tai, formally broke with Gao. When Gao advanced south to try to again take control of the imperial government, Emperor Xiaowu fled to Yuwen's territory, leading to Northern Wei's division into two (as Gao then made Yuan Shanjian (Emperor Xiaojing of Eastern Wei) the heir apparent, establishing Eastern Wei). Emperor Xiaowu's relationship with Yuwen, however, soon deteriorated over Yuwen's refusal to condone his incestuous relationships with his cousins, and around the new year 535, Yuwen poisoned him to death. Emperor Xiaowu's successor, Yuan Baoju (Emperor Wen of Western Wei), is typically regarded, then, as the first emperor of Western Wei, formalizing the division of the empire.

== Background ==
Yuan Xiu was born in 510, as the third son of Yuan Huai (元懷) the Prince of Guangping, a son of Emperor Xiaowen and a younger brother of the then-reigning Emperor Xuanwu. His mother Lady Li was Yuan Huai's concubine, although historical records were not clear on the issue. On 2 May 517, Yuan Huai died. (Note: Little is known about the rest of Yuan Xiu's family from official histories, as the biographies of Yuan Huai were inexplicably lost from extant editions of both the Book of Wei (zh:s:魏書/卷22) and the History of Northern Dynasties (zh:s:北史/卷019). However, his epitaph (which does not have a formal name as the epitaph lid was lost), as well as the epitaphs of his sons Yuan Hui (魏故司徒范阳王墓铭) and Yuan Ti (魏故侍中太尉公冀州刺史广平王墓铭) were found; in them, Yuan Huai's posthumous name was recorded as Prince Wumu of Guangping. Yuan Huai's epitaph recorded that he died at the age of 30 (by East Asian reckoning) on the 26th day of the 3rd month of the 2nd year of the Xiping era of the reign of Emperor Xiaoming of Northern Wei. One of Yuan Huai's daughters was Yuan Jiyan, the Princess Huayang. Her details are found in Jin Shi Lu (金石录) by Zhao Mingcheng and Qinghu Yilao Shiji (庆湖遗老诗集).) One of Emperor Xiaowu's sisters was married to Zhang Huan, a Han Chinese, according to the Book of Zhou (Zhoushu). His name is given as Zhang Xin in the Book of Northern Qi (Bei Qishu) and History of the Northern Dynasties (Beishi) which mention his marriage to a Xianbei princess of Wei. His personal name was changed due to a naming taboo on the emperor's name. He was the son of Zhang Qiong.

In Yuan Xiu's youth, he was considered to be quiet and smart, and he was interested in military matters. In 527, Emperor Xuanwu's son Emperor Xiaoming created Yuan Xiu the Duke of Ruyang. In 530, Emperor Xiaozhuang promoted him to the title of Prince of Pingyang.

In 532, the general Gao Huan defeated the members of the Erzhu clan. (Note: These were the clansmen of the paramount general Erzhu Rong, who had overthrown and killed Emperor Xiaozhuang after Emperor Xiaozhuang killed Erzhu Rong in 530.) During the campaign, Gao had declared Yuan Lang, a distant member of the imperial Yuan clan, emperor, to compete with Emperor Jiemin, whom Erzhu Rong's cousin Erzhu Shilong had made emperor. Gao, after victory, considered Yuan Lang an inappropriate choice to be emperor, given his distant relationship to the recent emperors. He considered keeping Emperor Jiemin on the throne, but decided against it when his generals Wei Lan'gen (魏蘭根) and Cui Ling (name not in Unicode) opined that Emperor Jiemin would be difficult to control in the future; he therefore had Emperor Jiemin imprisoned. He also considered making Yuan Yue (元悅) the Prince of Ru'nan, the only surviving son of Emperor Xiaowen, whom he welcomed back from rival Liang dynasty (where Yuan Yue had fled earlier), emperor, but later changed his mind after hearing that Yuan Yue was violent and arbitrary. At that time, the imperial princes were all largely in hiding, and Yuan Xiu was hiding at a farm. Gao's ally, the general Husi Chun, located Yuan Xiu, and Gao wanted to make Yuan Xiu emperor. After a meeting with Gao, in which Gao vowed allegiance, Yuan Xiu decided to agree. Gao therefore forced Yuan Lang to yield the throne to Yuan Xiu, who then took the throne as Emperor Xiaowu.

== Reign in Luoyang ==
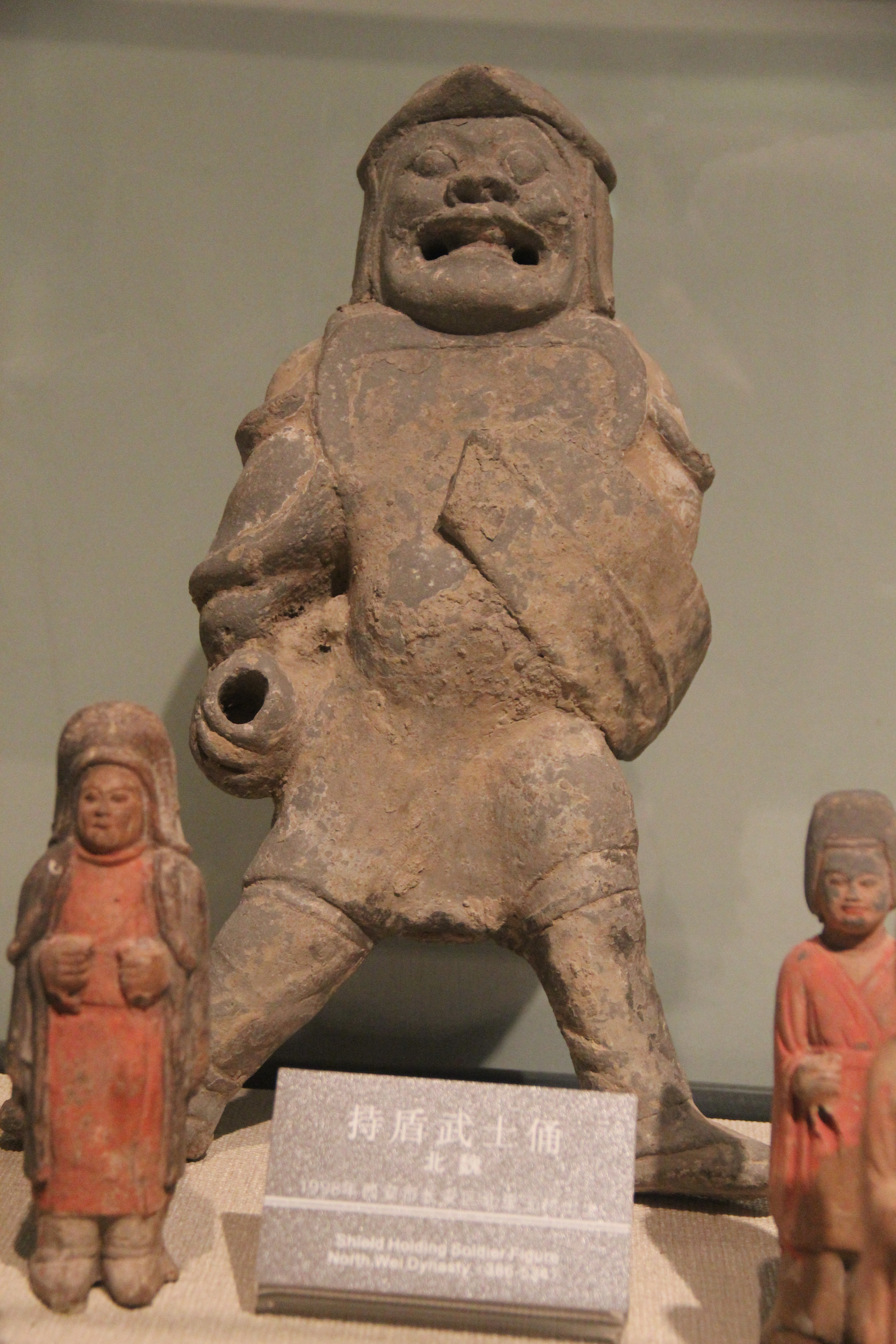
Shield holding soldier figurine of Northern Wei

One thing Emperor Xiaowu immediately started doing—for which he was criticized by historians—was eliminating potential claimants to the throne. Less than 10 days after taking the throne, he poisoned the deposed Emperor Jiemin to death. Six months later, he forced Yuan Lang and another former emperor, Yuan Ye, to commit suicide. He also executed his uncle Yuan Yue.

Although Gao made him emperor, Emperor Xiaowu also almost immediately tried to do what he could to avoid being controlled by Gao. Although he married Gao's oldest daughter as his empress around the new year 533, he, after initially appearing to show deference to Gao, began to rule with Husi Chun and his associate Wang Sizheng as his assistants, making decisions contrary to Gao's opinion, particularly after Gao had defeated the final major member of the Erzhu clan, Erzhu Zhao. He secretly communicated with Heba Yue, who controlled the western provinces, and also commissioned Heba Yue's brother Heba Sheng as the commander of the southern provinces, wanting to depend on the Heba brothers to resist Gao's hold. Tensions also increased over Gao's desire to control more provinces and Emperor Xiaowu's corresponding desire to wrest control of the provinces from Gao.

In spring 534, Heba Yue's friend and lieutenant, Houmochen Yue, due to Gao's instigation, assassinated Heba Yue. Heba Yue's troops supported Heba Yue's assistant Yuwen Tai to replace him, and Yuwen soon defeated Houmochen, who committed suicide. Emperor Xiaowu continued to engage in talks with Yuwen (whom Heba Yue had previously sent to Emperor Xiaowu as a liaison) with an eye of depending on Yuwen to face off against Gao. In summer 534, Emperor Xiaowu prepared his troops and, believing he could catch Gao by surprise, issued secret edits to Gao pretending that he was suspecting Yuwen and Heba Sheng of rebellion and planning to attack them with Gao. Gao saw through Emperor Xiaowu's plot, however, and instead marched toward Luoyang. Wang Sizheng, believing that the imperial troops were not strong enough to resist Gao's, suggested Emperor Xiaowu to flee to Yuwen's territory, and Emperor Xiaowu decided to do so, rejecting Husi Chun's offer to take one final stand at Luoyang, particularly when Heba Sheng failed to come to the emperor's aid and when Yuwen's troops failed to arrive quickly. It took Gao only a month to reach Luoyang, and Emperor Xiaowu fled west, encountering Yuwen's troops on the way, and had them escort him back to Yuwen's headquarters at Chang'an, where he reestablished the imperial government and made Yuwen prime minister. He also married his sister Princess Fengyi to Yuwen.

== Flight to Chang'an and death ==
Meanwhile, Gao Huan took over the Luoyang region, and soon also defeated Heba Sheng, taking over his territory and forcing him to flee to Liang. Gao then wrote repeated petitions to Emperor Xiaowu, requesting that he return to Luoyang and indicating that he was willing to return to the status quo ante. Emperor Xiaowu did not respond to any of Gao's overtures. Gao therefore made Yuan Shanjian, the son and heir apparent of Emperor Xiaowu's cousin Yuan Dan (元亶) the Prince of Qinghe emperor (as Emperor Xiaojing) and moving the capital from Luoyang to Yecheng, thus formally dividing the empire into two (Eastern Wei under Emperor Xiaojing and Western Wei under Emperor Xiaowu), albeit with each claiming to be the rightful one.

Meanwhile, Emperor Xiaowu's relationship with Yuwen Tai was deteriorating. While at Luoyang, he had previously entered into incestuous relationships with three of his cousins—Yuan Mingyue (元明月) the Princess Pingyuan, the Princess Ande, and Yuan Jili (元蒺藜), who was also created princess. Yuan Mingyue accompanied him on his flight to Chang'an, but Yuwen disapproved of the relationship, and persuaded the imperial princes to arrest and kill her. Emperor Xiaowu was very angry, and he often used his bow or pounded his table inside the palace as demonstrations of his displeasure. Around the new year 535, he drank wine spiked by poison—in all likelihood placed by Yuwen's assassins—and died. Yuwen made his cousin Yuan Baoju the Prince of Nanyang (Yuan Mingyue's brother) emperor (as Emperor Wen).

== Family ==
=== Consorts and issue ===
- Empress Yongxi, of the Gao clan of Bohai (永熙皇后 渤海高氏)
- Lady Xing, of the Xing clan of Hejian (河间邢氏), personal name Tong'e (同娥)
- Unknown
  - Yuan Guangji, Prince Wu (吳王 元光基; 527–545), fourth son
  - Princess Dongping (东平公主)

== Notes ==
Regnal titles
Preceded by Yuan Lang (Prince of Anding)	Emperor of Northern Wei (Northern); 532–534	Succeeded by Emperor Xiaojing of Eastern Wei
Preceded by Emperor Jiemin of Northern Wei	Emperor of Northern Wei (Eastern); 532–534	Succeeded by Emperor Xiaojing of Eastern Wei
Preceded by Emperor Jiemin of Northern Wei	Emperor of Northern Wei (Western); 532–535	Succeeded by Emperor Wen of Western Wei
