= Book of Wei =

Book by Wei Shou about Northern Wei and Eastern Wei dynasties

- Traditional Chinese: 魏書
- Simplified Chinese: 魏书
Transcriptions
Standard Mandarin
- Hanyu Pinyin: Wèi Shū
Southern Min
- Hokkien POJ: Gūi-su

The Book of Wei, also known by its Chinese name as the Wei Shu, (Note: Besides the text about Cao Wei found in Records of the Three Kingdoms, there were other books titled Wei Shu about Cao Wei, including the one written by Wang Chen.) is a classic Chinese historical text compiled by Wei Shou from 551 to 554, and is an important text describing the history of the Northern Wei and Eastern Wei from 386 to 550. Widely regarded as the official and authoritative source historical text for that period, it is one of the Twenty-Four Histories.

== Origin and reception ==
The Northern Wei dynasty was established in 386 by the Tuoba clan. The greatest accomplishment of the Northern Wei dynasty was the unification of Northern China in 439. An internal struggle resulted in a split which introduced the Eastern Wei and the Western Wei. The Eastern Wei dynasty was short-lived. Established in 534, several military campaigns were fought to try to reunite east and west but each failed. In 550, the area was taken over by Gao Yang who founded his own dynasty which he names the Northern Qi. It is the history of these two dynasties that Wei Shou attempted to record.

In compiling the work, Wei Shou managed to withstand pressure, with the help of the Northern Qi emperor, from powerful elites who wanted him to glorify their otherwise disputed ancestral origins. (Note: An example is Wang Songnian (王松年). Wang grew outraged at Wei Shou because the Book of Wei fully recorded the fact that his ancestor's claim to have come from the prominent Wang clan of Taiyuan was not believed by many at the time. See Book of Northern Qi, Volume 35.) Detractors of the work referred to the book as Hui Shu (穢書), nearly pronounced as 'Wei Shu', but meaning "Book of Filth". From a modern reader's perspective, the book had problems characteristic of other works in Twenty-Four Histories, as it praised the subject dynasty of interest (in this case the Northern Wei). It likely overstated the power of her predecessor state Dai, which was a vassal of Western Jin, Later Zhao, Former Yan, and Former Qin. Further, it retroactively used the sinicized surnames introduced by Emperor Xiaowen of Northern Wei in 496 to apply to events long before, making it difficult for readers to know what the actual names of historical personages were. In addition, Wei Shou was criticized in that, as an official of the Eastern Wei and its successor state Northern Qi, he included the sole emperor of Eastern Wei, Emperor Xiaojing, among his imperial lists while intentionally omitting the three emperors from the rival state Western Wei after the division of the Northern Wei in 534. However, he was credited with harmonizing highly confusing and fragmented accounts of historical events from the state of Dai to the early period of Northern Wei and creating coherent accounts of events.

== Content ==
The content of the Book of Wei follows the format of previous standard histories. The first fifteen chapters are annals (紀) describing the lives and events of the emperors, with the first being a preface.

=== Annals (帝紀) ===
#	Title	Translation	Notes
Chapter 1	帝紀第1 序紀	(Preface)	
Chapter 2	帝紀第2 太祖道武帝	Emperor Daowu	
Chapter 3	帝紀第3 太宗明元帝	Emperor Mingyuan	
Chapter 4 Part 1	帝紀第4 世祖太武帝	Emperor Taiwu	
Chapter 4 Part 2	帝紀第4 世祖太武帝 恭宗景穆帝	Emperor Taiwu, Emperor Jingmu	
Chapter 5	帝紀第5 高宗文成帝	Emperor Wencheng	
Chapter 6	帝紀第6 显祖献文帝	Emperor Xianwen	
Chapter 7 Part 1	帝紀第7 高祖孝文帝	Emperor Xiaowen	
Chapter 7 Part 2	帝紀第7 高祖孝文帝	Emperor Xiaowen	
Chapter 8	帝紀第8 世宗宣武帝	Emperor Xuanwu	
Chapter 9	帝紀第9 肅宗孝明帝	Emperor Xiaoming	
Chapter 10	帝紀第10 敬宗孝莊帝	Emperor Xiaozhuang	
Chapter 11	帝紀第11 前廢帝・後廢帝・出帝	Emperor Jiemin (Qianfei), Prince of Anding (Emperor Houfei), Emperor Xiaowu (Chu)	
Chapter 12	帝紀第12 孝静帝	Emperor Xiaojing of Eastern Wei	

Chapter 13 through 104 are biographies beginning with Chapter 13: Biographies of Empresses (皇后列傳) and ending with Chapter 104: Author's Preface (自序). In his preface Wei Shou harmonizes the Xianbei cultural heritage with Han Chinese cultural heritage, arguing that the rise of the Northern Wei was mandated by Heaven and that the Xianbei people were descended from the Yellow Emperor. Descriptions of figures from the historic Korean kingdoms of Goguryeo, Baekje, and also Khitan and many other historic nationalities and regimes (Note: Examples include emperors of Cheng-Han, Eastern Jin, Liu Song dynasty, Southern Qi, Emperor Wu of Liang and Huan Xuan.) are included in chapters 95 through 103.

Wei Shou also includes positive descriptions of the dialog between Confucianism, Buddhism, and Daoism. For example, in Chapter 69 where the court official Pei Yanjun (裴延隽; d. 528) describes a knowledge of both Buddhism and Confucianism as being beneficial to social administration. The whole of Chapter 114, "Treatise on Buddhism and Daoism" (釋老志), of the Book of Wei is also related to this topic. Chapters 105 through 114 are treatises (志).

The book originally contains 114 chapters, but by the Song dynasty some chapters were already missing. Later editors reconstructed those chapters by taking material from the History of the Northern Dynasties dated to the 7th century.

== Translations ==
Dien translates parts of volume 59, which describes the dispute between the Northern Wei and Liu Song at Pengcheng. Lee translates part of volume 111 describing the case of Liu Hui (劉輝), who committed adultery while married to Princess Lanling (蘭陵公主).

== See also ==
- Twenty-Four Histories
- Change of Xianbei names to Han names
