= Erzhu Zhao =

Erzhu Zhao (爾朱兆) (died c.February 533), courtesy name Wanren (萬仁), Xianbei name Tumo'er (吐沒兒), was a general of the Xianbei-led Northern Wei dynasty of China. He was ethnically Xiongnu and a nephew of the paramount general Erzhu Rong. After Erzhu Rong was killed by Emperor Xiaozhuang, Erzhu Zhao came to prominence by defeating, capturing, and killing Emperor Xiaozhuang. Subsequently, however, his general Gao Huan rebelled against him, defeating him and overthrowing the Erzhu regime in 532, capturing and killing most members of the Erzhu clan. Erzhu Zhao himself tried to hold out, but was again defeated by Gao in February 533 and committed suicide.

== Under Erzhu Rong's command ==
Erzhu Zhao was Erzhu Rong's nephew. When he was young, he was known for his valor, physical strength and expertise in riding and archery; he was said to excel in armed combat so much that he could fight fierce beasts with his bare hands. One of Erzhu Rong's favorite activities as the chief of the Xiongnu Qihu (契胡) tribe was hunting, and of all his attendants, only Erzhu Zhao was able to keep up with him on hunts. Erzhu Rong therefore favored him greatly. However, once, when Erzhu Rong was asking his commanders for opinions on who could succeed him as the commanding general of the army if he were no longer there, most commanders opined that Erzhu Zhao could, but Erzhu Rong himself opined that Gao Huan was the only one capable of doing so, and he warned Erzhu Zhao, "You are no match for Gao Huan, and one day he will surely pierce through your nose." He also commented that Erzhu Zhao would be undefeatable as long as he commanded a cavalry force under 3,000 men—and that if he commanded more, his army would be in a state of confusion.

Later, after Erzhu Rong overthrew Emperor Xiaoming's mother Empress Dowager Hu, after she poisoned Emperor Xiaoming and made Emperor Xiaozhuang emperor, Erzhu Rong became the paramount general of the empire, and Erzhu Zhao became a major general under him. Emperor Xiaozhuang created him the Duke of Yingchuan. He participated in the campaign by Erzhu Rong's associate Yuan Tianmu against the rebel Xing Gao in 529, and subsequently, when Emperor Xiaozhuang was expelled from the capital Luoyang later that year by the competing claimant for the throne, Yuan Hao (who was supported by rival Liang Dynasty), Erzhu Zhao helped break the stalemate between Yuan Hao's troops and Erzhu Rong's troops by making a surprise attack against Yuan Hao's son Yuan Guanshou (元冠受), causing Yuan Hao's forces to collapse and Yuan Hao to flee, allowing Emperor Xiaozhuang to be restored. By 530, Erzhu Zhao was serving as the governor of Fen Province (汾州, roughly modern Linfen, Shanxi), near Erzhu Rong's headquarters at Jinyang (晉陽, in modern Taiyuan, Shanxi).

== Campaign against Emperor Xiaozhuang ==
In 530, Emperor Xiaozhuang, apprehensive that Erzhu Rong would one day seize the throne, ambushed him in the palace at Luoyang and killed him and Yuan Tianmu. Erzhu Rong's wife Princess Beixiang and cousin Erzhu Shilong fought their way out of Luoyang and initially battled with Emperor Xiaozhuang's troops outside of Luoyang, but eventually withdrew north across the Yellow River. Erzhu Zhao met them at Zhangzi (長子, in modern Changzhi, Shanxi), and they jointly declared Princess Beixiang's nephew Yuan Ye the Prince of Changguang, a distant member of the imperial Yuan clan, emperor, to compete with Emperor Xiaozhuang.

Despite the opposition of Gao Huan (who subsequently refused to participate in the campaign), Erzhu Rong advanced south to the Yellow River. Then, surprising Emperor Xiaozhuang, he quickly crossed the Yellow River, entering Luoyang and capturing Emperor Xiaozhuang. He allowed his soldiers to pillage the capital and kill many imperial officials, and he also killed the son of Emperor Xiaozhuang and Erzhu Rong's daughter, Empress Erzhu Ying'e. He then had Emperor Xiaozhuang delivered to Jinyang and, despite Gao's warning not to do so, strangled Emperor Xiaozhuang to death.

== Subsequent control of power ==
In light of the Erzhus' victory, they controlled the government, and Erzhu Zhao was recognized as the supreme military authority, and Yuan Ye created him the Prince of Yinchuan. (Yuan Ye also created Erzhu Zhao's daughter empress, although it is not clear whether Yuan Ye only married her at this point or had already married her previously.) However, he did not have as much control over the clan as Erzhu Rong did, and the imperial government largely was controlled by Erzhu Shilong. Erzhu Zhao himself controlled the provinces north of the Yellow River, while his cousin Erzhu Tianguang controlled the Guanzhong region, and Erzhu Shilong's brother Erzhu Zhongyuan controlled the southeastern provinces. Erzhu Zhao set up his headquarters at Jinyang, where Erzhu Rong's headquarters had been.

Around the new year 531, the general Gedouling Bufan (紇豆陵布番), who had been loyal to Emperor Xiaozhuang, attacked Erzhu Zhao from the north, and after scoring victories over him, approached Jinyang. Erzhu Zhao was fearful, and sought aid from Gao Huan. Gao agreed to help him, and together they defeated and killed Gedouling. In light of this joint victory, Erzhu Zhao and Gao swore to be brothers, and he, trusting Gao's faithfulness, gave the remnants of the rebel Ge Rong, largely ethnic Xianbei, to Gao—a decision that he would regret later.

In spring 531, after Yuan Ye arrived in Luoyang, Erzhu Shilong and Erzhu Tianguang, believing that Yuan Ye was too distantly related to the line of recent emperors and lacking in good reputation, forced Yuan Ye to yield the throne to Yuan Gong the Prince of Guangling (who took the throne as Emperor Jiemin). Because Erzhu Shilong did not first consult with Erzhu Zhao, Erzhu Zhao became angry and considered attacking Erzhu Shilong. Erzhu Zhao only calmed down and accepted the situation after Erzhu Shilong sent his brother Erzhu Yanbo (爾朱彥伯) to Jinyang to explain the decision to him.

== Defeat by Gao Huan and death ==
In summer 531, Gao Huan, believing that the Erzhus had become overly corrupt and therefore vulnerable, decided to rebel. He declared another distant member of the Yuan clan, Yuan Lang, emperor, to compete with Emperor Jiemin. When the Erzhu forces converged at Guang'a (廣阿, in modern Xingtai, Hebei) to face Gao, Gao used false rumors to make them suspicious of each other—by making Erzhu Zhao believe that Erzhu Shilong and his brothers were conspiring against him, and by making Erzhu Shilong and Erzhu Zhongyuan believing that Erzhu Zhao was conspiring with Gao. As a result, after a major quarrel between Erzhu Zhao and Erzhu Zhongyuan, Erzhu Zhongyuan and Erzhu Rong's cousin Erzhu Dulü withdrew, leaving Erzhu Zhao, albeit with still a much larger army than Gao's, alone against Gao. Gao subsequently defeated him, and, brushing his army aside, continued to advance south, entering the important city Yecheng in spring 532.

The Erzhu forces recoalesced, and to cement the unity, under Erzhu Shilong's suggestion, Emperor Jiemin married another daughter of Erzhu Zhao as his empress. Erzhu Zhao thereafter made a counterattack, trying to capture Yecheng, but was defeated by Gao. After the defeat, instead of turning his army back to Luoyang to join with Erzhu Shilong and Erzhu Tianguang (who had by this point arrived from his base in Chang'an), Erzhu Zhao returned to Jinyang. Meanwhile, the general Husi Chun rose against the Erzhus at Luoyang, killing Erzhu Shilong and Erzhu Yanbo and capturing Erzhu Tianguang and Erzhu Dulü, delivering them to Gao, who subsequently killed them after entering Luoyang. Erzhu Zhongyuan fled to Liang, leaving Erzhu Zhao as the only member of the Erzhu clan still remaining with a significant force. He withdrew from Jinyang and set up his new headquarters at Xiurong (秀容, in modern Shuozhou, Shanxi), the old territory of the Qihu tribe.

In spring 533, Gao, after making Erzhu Zhao relax by making multiple announcements of attacks but then not attacking, launched a surprise attack on Xiurong and defeated Erzhu Zhao's forces. Erzhu Zhao fled into the mountains, but, finding his escape route cut off, initially ordered his attendants Zhang Liang (張亮) and Chen Shanti (陳山提) to kill him. When Zhang and Chen could not bear doing so, he hanged himself on a tree after killing his war horse. Gao buried him with honors.
