= Erzhu Shilong =

Chinese politician (500–532)

Erzhu Shilong (爾朱世隆) (500 – 20 May 532), courtesy name Rongzong (榮宗), was an official of the Xianbei-led Northern Wei dynasty of China. He first became prominent when after his cousin Erzhu Rong overthrew Emperor Xiaoming's mother Empress Dowager Hu (after she poisoned Emperor Xiaoming) and made Emperor Xiaozhuang emperor. Later, when Emperor Xiaozhuang killed Erzhu Rong in 530, Erzhu Shilong participated in the counterattack that overthrew Emperor Xiaozhuang, and thereafter controlled the imperial government during the reign of Emperor Jiemin. When the general Gao Huan, in turn, rebelled in response to Emperor Xiaozhuang's death, the officials in the imperial capital Luoyang rebelled against the Erzhus, and Erzhu Shilong was executed after failing to flee Luoyang.

== Background ==
Erzhu Shilong was a cousin of Erzhu Rong and a fellow member of the ethnic Xiongnu Qihu (契胡) tribe, of which Erzhu Rong was chief. (They were at most as close as second cousins, as they did not have the same grandfather.) Unlike Erzhu Rong, who served his entire career as a general and not a civilian official, Erzhu Shilong was part of the imperial administration during the reign of Emperor Xiaoming, although he became a commander of the imperial guards as well.

In 528, Emperor Xiaoming, in a dispute with his mother Empress Dowager Hu over the continued control of the imperial administration along with her lover Zheng Yan (鄭儼) and Zheng's associate Xu Ge (徐紇), conspired with Erzhu Rong to have Erzhu Rong advance on the capital Luoyang to force Empress Dowager Hu to yield power. When Empress Dowager Hu discovered this, she poisoned Emperor Xiaoming to death and made his distant toddler nephew, Yuan Zhao, emperor. Erzhu Rong immediately denounced her publicly. In order to try to calm Erzhu Rong, Empress Dowager Hu sent Erzhu Shilong to him to try to explain her actions, and while Erzhu Rong wanted to keep Erzhu Shilong with him, Erzhu Shilong chose to return to Luoyang, reasoning that if he did not, Empress Dowager Hu would be aware that Erzhu Rong was planning to attack Luoyang and would take precautions.

Erzhu Rong soon advanced quickly on Luoyang; as he did, Erzhu Shilong secretly fled out of Luoyang and joined him at Shangdang (上黨, in modern Changzhi, Shanxi). Empress Dowager Hu's forces surrendered without significant combat. Erzhu Rong made Yuan Ziyou the Prince of Changle emperor (as Emperor Xiaozhuang), while throwing Empress Dowager Hu and Yuan Zhao into the Yellow River to drown. He also slaughtered a large number of imperial officials, and he installed a number of his close associates, among whom was Erzhu Shilong, into high positions in the imperial government.

== Under Erzhu Rong's command ==
Emperor Xiaozhuang made Erzhu Shilong pushe (僕射) -- a high level imperial official—and made him in charge of the civil service system. Erzhu Shilong, initially fearing that he was not capable for the position, spent much time and energy studying the laws and regulations, and reformed the system so that it was no longer strictly seniority-based. He received much praise for the reforms. Emperor Xiaozhuang also created him the Duke of Leping.

In 529, when Yuan Hao the Prince of Beihai, claimed the throne with the support by rival Liang Dynasty's troops, and Yuan Hao invaded and advanced toward Luoyang, Emperor Xiaozhuang made Erzhu Shilong be in charge of the key fortress of Hulao (虎牢, in modern Zhengzhou, Henan). Erzhu Shilong, however, lacked military talent, and when the Liang general Chen Qingzhi captured the nearby city of Yingyang (滎陽, also in modern Zhengzhou), Erzhu Shilong, in panic, abandoned Hulao and fled back to Luoyang, causing Emperor Xiaozhuang to flee the capital. Because of this, when Emperor Xiaozhuang was north of the Yellow River, he demoted Erzhu Shilong to be the governor of Xiang Province (相州, roughly modern Handan, Hebei), but after Emperor Xiaozhuang returned to Luoyang later that year after Erzhu Rong defeated Yuan Hao, Erzhu Shilong was restored to his position as pushe.

Emperor Xiaozhuang eventually came to fear that Erzhu Rong had designs on the throne. These fears were exacerbated by the chilly relationship that Emperor Xiaozhuang had with his wife, Erzhu Rong's daughter Empress Erzhu Ying'e, because of Empress Erzhu's jealousy. Emperor Xiaozhuang once asked Erzhu Shilong to try to ask Empress Erzhu to change her ways, and during the conversation Erzhu Shilong had with Empress Erzhu, she remarked that the Erzhus made Emperor Xiaozhuang emperor and that the situation was still changeable. Erzhu Shilong commented that if Erzhu Rong had taken the throne, he would have been an imperial prince. In 530, when Empress Erzhu became pregnant, Erzhu Rong arrived in the capital to attend to her birth, and it around this time that Emperor Xiaozhuang plotted with the officials Yuan Hui (元徽) the Prince of Chengyang, Li Yu (李彧), Yang Kan (楊侃), and Yuan Luo (元羅) to ambush Erzhu Rong. Erzhu Shilong heard rumors of this, and he personally wrote a warning to Erzhu Rong, but Erzhu Rong failed to heed the warning. Subsequently, when Erzhu Rong was in the palace, Emperor Xiaozhuang ambushed and killed him. Erzhu Shilong and Erzhu Rong's wife Princess Beixiang fought their way out of the capital.

== Campaign against Emperor Xiaozhuang ==
Initially, Erzhu Shilong was going to lead the remnants of Erzhu Rong's guards immediately to the Erzhus' stronghold of Jinyang (晉陽, in modern Taiyuan, Shanxi), then guarded by Erzhu Rong's nephew Erzhu Zhao. Erzhu Rong's strategist Sima Ziru (司馬子如) advised Erzhu Shilong that he needed to quickly make a show of strength to Emperor Xiaozhuang before doing so, and Erzhu Shilong therefore attacked and seized both Beizhong (北中, a fortress directly north of Luoyang across the Yellow River) and the Yellow River bridge connecting Luoyang and Beizhong. Emperor Xiaozhuang tried to get Erzhu Shilong to submit by offering him an "iron certificate" (鐵券, tie quan, which could be used against a death-eligible crime) to Erzhu Shilong if he would be willing to give up resisting. Erzhu Shilong refused—declaring that if Erzhu Rong could be killed after accomplishing so much, the certificate was meaningless. Emperor Xiaozhuang's troops and the Erzhus' troops stalemated for half a month, before an ambush by Emperor Xiaozhuang's official Li Miao (李苗) destroyed the Yellow River bridge, causing Erzhu Shilong to decide to march north. Erzhu Shilong met with Erzhu Zhao at Zhangzi (長子, in modern Changzhi, Shanxi), and they jointly declared Princess Beixiang's nephew Yuan Ye the Prince of Changguang emperor, as a competing candidate for the throne. Yuan Ye created Erzhu Shilong the Prince of Leping.

Soon, the Erzhu forces, under Erzhu Zhao's command, advanced south and caught Emperor Xiaozhuang, who did not expect Erzhu Zhao to be able to cross the Yellow River easily, by surprise when he had his army ride on horsebacks across the river around the new year 531. Emperor Xiaozhuang's imperial guards collapsed, and he was captured by Erzhu Zhao's cavalry soldiers and imprisoned, less than three months after he killed Erzhu Rong. Erzhu Zhao killed Emperor Xiaozhuang's infant son (by Empress Erzhu), while allowing his soldiers to pillage Luoyang, killing many officials and raping many honored women.

Erzhu Zhao, believing that he had accomplished much, was arrogant in his attitude toward Erzhu Shilong, blaming Erzhu Shilong for failing to sufficiently warn Erzhu Rong. Erzhu Shilong apologized profusely, but bore resentment against Erzhu Zhao after that point. However, Erzhu Zhao soon returned to Jinyang, leaving Erzhu Shilong in control of Luoyang and the imperial administration. Erzhu Shilong, meanwhile, apprehensive that Yuan Ye's mother Lady Wei might exert political influence, had her assassinated, but staging the assassination to look like a robbery.

== Subsequent control of power ==
Erzhu Zhao soon had Emperor Xiaozhuang strangled to death. In light of the Erzhus' death, they controlled all the important functions of the government, and Erzhu Shilong controlled the imperial government, quickly reorganizing it and restoring order in Luoyang. Erzhu Zhao was recognized the paramount military authority, and controlled the provinces north of the Yellow River, while Erzhu Rong's nephew Erzhu Tianguang controlled the Guanzhong region, and Erzhu Shilong's brother Erzhu Zhongyuan controlled the southeastern provinces.

In early 531, before the new emperor Yuan Ye could arrive in Luoyang, Erzhu Shilong and his brothers Erzhu Zhongyuan and Erzhu Yanbo (爾朱彥伯), as well as Erzhu Tianguang, because Yuan Ye's lineage was distant from that of recent emperors, believed him to be an inappropriate choice as emperor. Erzhu Tianguang proposed Yuan Gong the Prince of Guangling, a grandson of Emperor Xianwen, who had been well regarded by the populace. Erzhu Shilong sent Erzhu Yanbo to force Yuan Gong to accept the throne, and Yuan Gong agreed. When Yuan Ye arrived in Luoyang, Erzhu Shilong forced him to yield the throne to Yuan Gong, who took the throne as Emperor Jiemin. (Erzhu Zhao, who was not consulted, was initially angry and considered attacking Erzhu Shilong. He only calmed down after Erzhu Shilong sent Erzhu Yanbo to Jinyang to explain the decision to him.)

Erzhu Shilong, by this point, had grown complacent and arrogant, and no longer paid as much attention to handling his duties as well as he had done during Emperor Xiaozhuang's reign. He tried to appease military commanders by promoting most of them to generals, and as a result, the "general" title became no longer a valued one.

== Defeat by Gao Huan and death ==
Meanwhile, the other members of the Erzhu clan were also growing corrupt, particularly Erzhu Zhongyuan. The general Gao Huan, who had been a follower of Erzhu Rong, believed that the Erzhus could be overthrown, and rebelled in summer 531. The members of the Erzhu clan were largely unconcerned, due to Gao's inferiority in numbers, but Erzhu Shilong, knowing Gao's abilities, was concerned. Gao soon declared another distant member of the imperial Yuan clan, Yuan Lang, emperor. When the Erzhu forces converged at Guang'a (廣阿, in modern Xingtai, Hebei) to face Gao, Gao used false rumors to make them suspicious of each other—by making Erzhu Zhao believe that Erzhu Shilong and his brothers were conspiring against him, and by making Erzhu Shilong and Erzhu Zhongyuan believing that Erzhu Zhao was conspiring with Gao. As a result, after a major quarrel between Erzhu Zhao and Erzhu Zhongyuan, Erzhu Zhongyuan and Erzhu Rong's cousin Erzhu Dulü withdrew, leaving Erzhu Zhao, albeit with still a much larger army than Gao's, alone against Gao. Gao subsequently defeated him, and, brushing his army aside, continued to advance south, entering the important city Yecheng in spring 532.

The Erzhu forces recoalesced, and to cement the unity, under Erzhu Shilong's suggestion, Emperor Jiemin married a daughter of Erzhu Zhao as his empress. Erzhu Zhao thereafter made a counterattack, trying to capture Yecheng, but was defeated by Gao. After the defeat, instead of turning his army back to Luoyang to join with Erzhu Shilong and Erzhu Tianguang (who had by this point arrived from his base in Chang'an), Erzhu Zhao returned to Jinyang. The general Husi Chun rose against the Erzhus at Luoyang, capturing Erzhu Shilong and Erzhu Yanbo, and then beheaded them outside the city gates.
