= Emperor Jiemin of Northern Wei =

Emperor Jiemin of Northern Wei 北魏節閔帝

Emperor of Northern Wei
- Reign: 1 April 531 – 6 June 532
- Predecessor: Yuan Ye
- Successor: Yuan Lang
- Born: 498
- Died: 21 June 532
Names
- Family name: Yuán (元); Given name: Gōng (恭)
Era name and dates
- Pǔtài (普泰): 531-532
Posthumous name
- Emperor Jiemin (節閔皇帝; lit. "self-controlled and careful")
- House: Yuan
- Dynasty: Northern Wei

Emperor Jiemin of Northern Wei ((北)魏節閔帝) (498 – 21 June 532), also known as Emperor Qianfei (前廢帝), at times referred to by pre-ascension title Prince of Guangling (廣陵王), personal name Yuan Gong (元恭), courtesy name Xiuye (脩業), was an emperor of the Xianbei-led Northern Wei dynasty of China. He became emperor after the clan members of the paramount general Erzhu Rong, after Erzhu Rong was killed by Emperor Xiaozhuang, overthrew Emperor Xiaozhuang. Emperor Jiemin tried to revive order of the Northern Wei state, but with his power curbed by the Erzhus, was not able to accomplish much. After the general Gao Huan defeated the Erzhus in 532, Emperor Jiemin was imprisoned by Gao and subsequently poisoned to death by Emperor Xiaowu, whom Gao made emperor.

== Background ==
Yuan Gong was born in 498, during the reign of Emperor Xiaowen. His father was Yuan Yu (元羽) the Prince of Guangling, a son of Emperor Xianwen and a brother of Emperor Xiaowen. His mother was Yuan Yu's concubine Lady Wang. In 501, during the reign of Emperor Xiaowen's son Emperor Xuanwu, Yuan Yu died from injuries he suffered when he was attacked by his lover's husband, the low level official, Feng Junxing (馮俊興). For reasons unclear, Yuan Gong inherited Yuan Yu's title even though he had one older brother, Yuan Xin, and neither he nor Yuan Xin was the son of Yuan Yu's wife Princess Zheng Shirong (郑始容). Yuan Gong also had one younger brother, Yuan Yongye (元永業).

Yuan Gong was described to be confident and strong-willed, and also filially pious toward his grandmother Princess Dowager Meng and his father's wife Princess Dowager Zheng (whom, under Confucian doctrines, he was required to treat her as a mother). During Yuan Cha's regency over Emperor Xuanwu's son Emperor Xiaoming (i.e., sometime between 520 and 525), Yuan Gong, because of Yuan Cha's corruption and violent tendencies, pretended to be ill and unable to speak, living in the Buddhist Longhua Temple (龍花寺). During the reign of his cousin Emperor Xiaozhuang, someone made a report to Emperor Xiaozhuang that Yuan Gong was only pretending to be unable to speak, and had treasonous intent. When Yuan Gong was informed of this, he, in fear, fled to Shangluo Mountain (上洛山, in modern Shangzhou, Shaanxi), but was captured and returned to Luoyang. Interrogations and investigations, however, yielded no proof that Yuan Gong plotted treason, so he was released.

In 530, Emperor Xiaozhuang, in fear that the paramount general Erzhu Rong would seize the throne, killed Erzhu Rong. Erzhu Rong's clan members rose and declared Erzhu Rong's wife Princess Beixiang's nephew Yuan Ye the Prince of Changguang emperor. Around the new year 531, Erzhu Rong's nephew Erzhu Zhao captured Luoyang and seized Emperor Xiaozhuang, subsequently killing him. Yuan Ye traveled toward Luoyang to take the throne. However, Erzhu Rong's cousin Erzhu Shilong was uncomfortable with Yuan Ye's lineage being distant from that of recent emperors, and wanted to find an emperor with closer imperial lineage. Erzhu Rong's nephew Erzhu Tianguang suggested Yuan Gong, and after Erzhu Shilong sent his brother Erzhu Yanbo (爾朱彥伯) to visit Yuan Gong to force him to accept and to ascertain that he was not truly unable to speak, Yuan Gong agreed, and Erzhu Shilong, when Yuan Ye arrived at Luoyang, forced him to yield the throne to Yuan Gong. Yuan Gong, after making three submissions to Yuan Ye declining the throne, took the throne as Emperor Jiemin.

== Reign ==
During Emperor Jiemin's reign, the Erzhu clan members controlled much of the functions of the central government, the provinces, and the military, with Erzhu Shilong controlling the central government, Erzhu Zhao controlling the northern provinces, Erzhu Tianguang controlling the western provinces, and Erzhu Zhongyuan controlling the southeastern provinces. Despite this, Emperor Jiemin himself tried to exert influences on policy in subtle ways, and at times he refused to following Erzhu Shilong's wishes. For example, when Erzhu Shilong had the official Xing Zicai (邢子才) author Emperor Jiemin's general pardon edict, describing the death of Erzhu Rong in detail as an extremely wrongful act by Emperor Xiaozhuang, Emperor Jiemin refused to promulgate the edict as written, but instead wrote a brief edict himself, using humble language and not getting into details. He also removed the character huang (皇) from his title, going from huangdi (皇帝) to just di (帝). He treated Yuan Ye with honor, creating him the Prince of Donghai. He also, in an unprecedented action, ordered that rival Liang Dynasty no longer be referred to as "false" (偽, wei) Liang. (Traditionally, in Chinese history, the rival states referred to each other as "false.") He posthumously honored his father Yuan Yu as emperor, but only honored his mother Lady Wang as princess dowager, perhaps out of respect to Yuan Yu's wife Princess Zheng. He also created his brother Yuan Yongye the Prince of Gaomi and his son Yuan Shu (元恕) as Prince of Bohai.

The Erzhus, however, engaged in violence and corruption, and Emperor Jiemin was unable to curb them. As a result, in succession, the generals Liu Lingzhu (劉靈助) and Gao Huan rebelled. Liu was easily defeated, but Gao, with many disaffected generals joining him, proved to be a formidable opponent, and Gao, who initially acknowledged Emperor Jiemin's position as emperor, soon had another distant member of the imperial Yuan clan, Yuan Lang, declared emperor. In late 531, with the Erzhu clan in internal dissent from rumors that Gao spread, Gao defeated Erzhu Zhao and captured the important city Yecheng.

In spring 532, Erzhu Shilong, in order to end the dissension within the Erzhu clan, requested that Emperor Jiemin marry Erzhu Zhao's daughter as his empress. Soon, the Erzhu forces, commanded by Erzhu Zhao, Erzhu Tianguang, Erzhu Zhongyuan, and Erzhu Shilong's brother Erzhu Dulü, converged at Yecheng to face Gao Huan, but despite their numerical advantage, Gao defeated them. Erzhu Zhao and Erzhu Zhongyuan fled back to their headquarters, while Erzhu Tianguang and Erzhu Dulü fled back toward Luoyang. At this time, the general Husi Chun rose against the Erzhus at Luoyang, and he killed Erzhu Shilong and Erzhu Yanbo, while capturing and delivering Erzhu Tianguang and Erzhu Dulü to Gao, who executed them.

== After the defeat of the Erzhus ==
Emperor Jiemin tried to take initiative by sending the official Lu Bian (盧辯) to greet Gao. Gao, who was then accompanying Yuan Lang and heading toward Luoyang, considered allowing Emperor Jiemin to keep the throne, as Yuan Lang's lineage was distant from recent emperors. He sent the general Wei Lan'gen (魏蘭根) to calm the imperial officials and to observe Emperor Jiemin. After Wei returned to Gao, Wei opined that Emperor Jiemin was intelligent and decisive and would be difficult to control in the future. Gao therefore arrested Emperor Jiemin and imprisoned him at Chongxun Temple (崇訓寺). Gao instead forced Yuan Lang to yield the throne to Yuan Xiu the Prince of Pingyang, and Yuan Xiu took the throne as Emperor Xiaowu.

During Emperor Jiemin's imprisonment at Chongxun Temple, he wrote a poem that is still extant:

A red door [sign of an honored household] brings disaster in the end;
The imperial purple is not something to be accustomed to;
Falls can be expected;
Things change three times a year;
And this is what fortune brings;
It is better to study the true path.

About 10 days after Emperor Xiaowu took the throne, he sent messengers to poison Emperor Jiemin. He did not bury Emperor Jiemin with imperial honors, but did give him a burial that was greater than ordinary for imperial princes, and ordered the imperial officials to attend the funeral.

== Family ==
=== Consorts and issue ===
- Empress, of the Erzhu clan (皇后 爾朱氏)
- Unknown
  - Yuan Zishu, Prince Pei (沛王 元子恕)

Chinese royalty
Preceded by Yuan Ye (Prince of Changguang)	Emperor of Northern Wei (Northern); 531	Succeeded by Yuan Lang (Prince of Anding)
Preceded by Yuan Ye (Prince of Changguang)	Emperor of Northern Wei (Southern); 531–532	Succeeded by Emperor Xiaowu of Northern Wei
