= Erzhu Rong =

Northern Wei general (493-530)

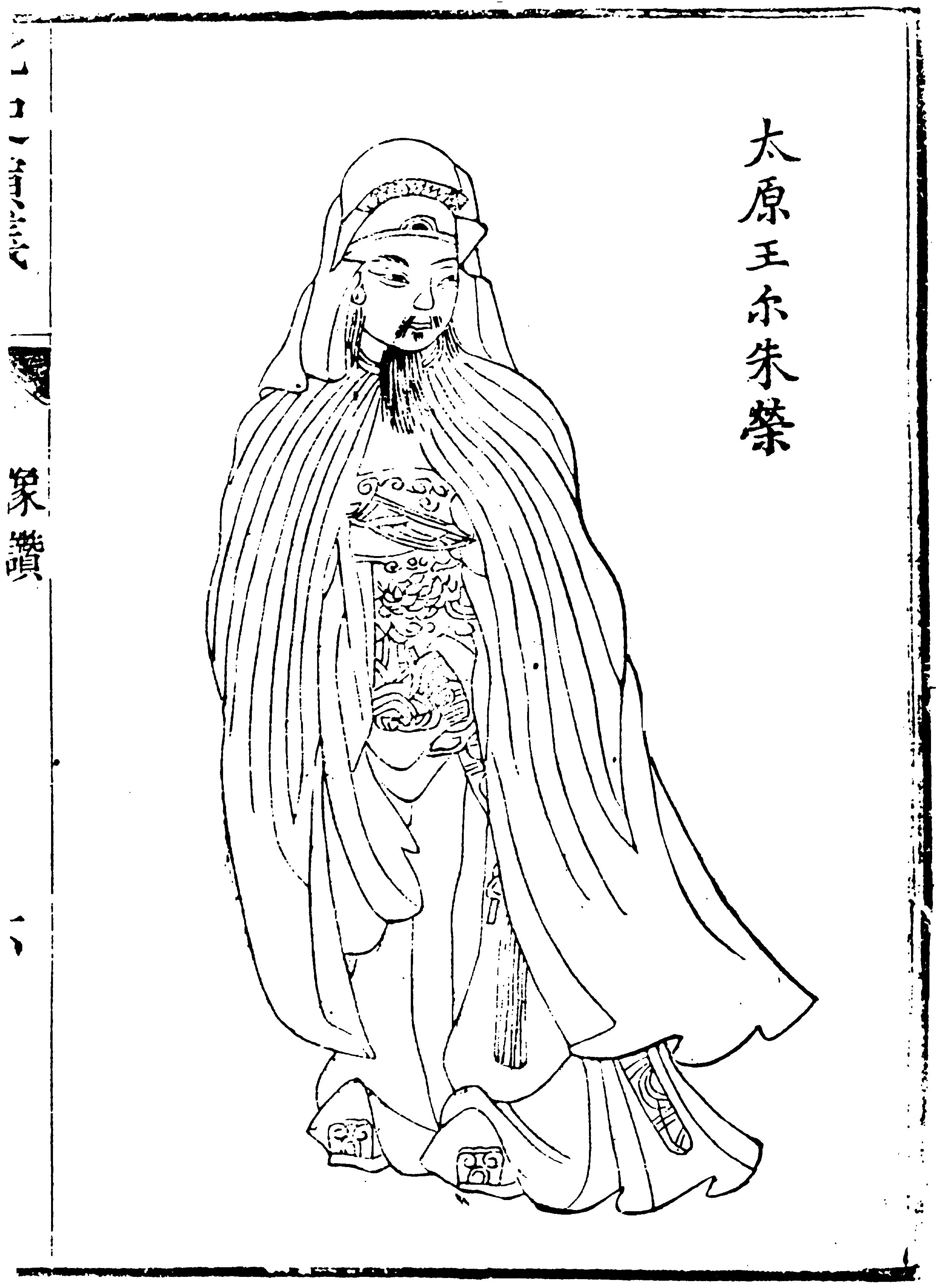
Erzhu Rong

Erzhu Rong (爾朱榮) (493 (Note: According to Erzhu Rong's biography in Book of Wei, he was 38 (by East Asian reckoning) when he died. Thus by calculation, his birth year should be about 493.) – 1 November 530), courtesy name Tianbao (天寶), formally Prince Wu of Jin (晉武王), was a general of the Xianbei-led Chinese Northern Wei dynasty. He was of Xiongnu ancestry, and after Emperor Xiaoming was killed by his mother Empress Dowager Hu in 528, Erzhu overthrew her and put Emperor Xiaozhuang on the throne, but at the same time slaughtered many imperial officials and took over most of actual power, effectively ruling as military dictator of the Northern Wei State. He then contributed much to the rebuilding of the Northern Wei state by putting down the various agrarian rebellions that had fractured the state during Emperor Xiaoming's reign. However, in 530, Emperor Xiaozhuang, believing that Erzhu would eventually usurp the throne, tricked Erzhu into the palace and ambushed him. Subsequently, however, Erzhu's clan members, led by his cousin Erzhu Shilong and nephew Erzhu Zhao, defeated and killed Emperor Xiaozhuang. He was often compared by historians to the Han dynasty general Dong Zhuo, for his ferocity in battle and for his violence and lack of tact. Unlike Dong Zhuo however, by accounts of Wei Shou, the author of Northern Wei's official history, the Wei Shu, Erzhu Rong's military skills had few equals in his time, and he is not recorded to have ever lost a battle.

== During Emperor Xiaoming's reign ==
Erzhu Rong's ancestors were hereditary chiefs of the Qihu (契胡) tribe of Jie extraction, and they used Erzhu as their family name after settling on Erzhu River (modern Zhujia River, Shanxi). Erzhu Rong's great-great-grandfather Erzhu Yujian (爾朱羽健) had assisted Northern Wei's founding emperor Emperor Daowu in his campaigns, and therefore was granted the Xiurong (秀容, in modern Shuozhou, Shanxi) region as the Erzhus' hereditary domain. There, the Erzhus practiced husbandry and became extremely wealthy from the accumulation of livestock.

Erzhu Rong himself was born in 493, during the reign of Emperor Xiaowen. When Erzhu Rong's father Erzhu Xinxing (爾朱新興) grew old, Erzhu Xinxing asked that the chief post be passed to Erzhu Rong, and the imperial government agreed. Erzhu Rong was described to be a pale-skinned man who was handsome, resolute, ambitious and capable in military matters, and was particularly strict in military discipline. As he saw the empire begin to degrade during Emperor Xiaoming's reign, he began to consider whether the empire would collapse, and he sold part of his livestock to gather brave warriors around him. He married a distant member of the imperial Yuan clan, the daughter of Yuan Zhen (元禎) the Prince of Nan'an, a brother of Emperor Wencheng.

In 524, as Northern Wei was in the middle of facing a large number of agrarian rebellions, a man from Xiurong, Qifu Moyu (乞伏莫于), started a rebellion as well in Xiurong, and he was soon joined by a shepherd, Wanyu Qizhen (萬于乞真), killing the general Lu Yan (陸延), whom the imperial government had sent against them. Erzhu used his own private forces to defeat Qifu and Wanyu. As a result of this victory, he received a general commission, and he started to further accumulate soldiers, soon engaging in campaigns to defeat more rebels around the region. He thus received increasing authorities and honors, and was by 526 the Duke of Liang Commandery. That year, when he approached the government-held Si Province (肆州, roughly modern Xinzhou, Shanxi), the governor of Si Province, Wei Qingbin (尉慶賓) became apprehensive of his intentions and refused to let him enter. This drew Erzhu's ire, and he attacked Wei, seizing him and commissioning his uncle Erzhu Yusheng (爾朱羽生) as governor without imperial permission. From this point on, it became increasingly difficult for the imperial government to control Erzhu Rong.

Sometime during Emperor Xiaoming's reign, Emperor Xiaoming took Erzhu Rong's daughter Lady Erzhu as a concubine.

== Campaign against Empress Dowager Hu and the Heyin Massacre ==
By 528, the ambitious Erzhu Rong had seen that Empress Dowager Hu, who was serving as Emperor Xiaoming's regent, had grown increasingly unpopular with the people due to her toleration of corruption by her lover Zheng Yan (鄭儼) and Zheng's associate Xu Ge (徐紇). Under advice from his generals Gao Huan and Heba Yue and close friend Yuan Tianmu, Erzhu considered waging a campaign to end Empress Dowager Hu's regency, and therefore prepared his army for campaign, while claiming that he was seeking to attack the rebel Ge Rong, who had claimed the title Emperor of Qi. Empress Dowager Hu, under advice from Xu, tried to alienate Erzhu's generals from him by awarding them "iron certificates" (鐵券, tie quan, advance promises to pardon death-eligible crimes), and when Erzhu realized this, he became increasingly resentful of Empress Dowager Hu.

Meanwhile, Emperor Xiaoming, who was then 18 years old, was not any happier about Empress Dowager Hu's toleration of corruption and hold on power than Erzhu. He sent secret messengers to Erzhu, ordering him to advance on Luoyang to force Empress Dowager Hu to give up power and to kill Zheng and Xu. Erzhu therefore started heading toward Luoyang. However, for reasons unknown, Emperor Xiaoming then sent another messenger to him to order him to stop, but the news still leaked. Zheng and Xu advised Empress Dowager Hu to poison Emperor Xiaoming, and she did so. She, after initially declaring a child of Emperor Xiaoming emperor, soon admitted that the child was a daughter, not a son, and therefore ineligible for the throne. She then declared Yuan Zhao, a two-year-old child and son of Yuan Baohui (元寶暉) the Prince of Lintao (a distant cousin of Emperor Xiaoming), emperor.

Erzhu refused to recognize Yuan Zhao as emperor. With support from Yuan Tianmu, he issued a harshly worded statement accusing Zheng and Xu of poisoning Emperor Xiaoming. Empress Dowager Hu sent Erzhu Rong's cousin Erzhu Shilong to try to persuade him to change his mind, but Erzhu Shilong instead encouraged him to continue his resistance. He therefore prepared to advance south, and meanwhile sent messengers to persuade Emperor Xuanwu's well-regarded cousin Yuan Ziyou the Prince of Changle to accept the throne as a competing claimant to the throne. Yuan Ziyou agreed, and as Erzhu Rong approached Luoyang, Yuan Ziyou and his brothers Yuan Shao (元劭) the Prince of Pengcheng and Yuan Zizheng (元子正) the Duke of Bacheng secretly left Luoyang to join Erzhu's army. Erzhu declared him emperor (as Emperor Xiaozhuang). In turn, Emperor Xiaozhuang created Erzhu the Prince of Taiyuan. As soon as news of Emperor Xiaozhuang's ascension reached Luoyang, Luoyang's defenses collapsed, and Zheng and Xu, abandoning Empress Dowager Hu, fled, while the generals Zheng Xianhu (鄭先護, Zheng Yan's cousin) and Fei Mu (費穆) surrendered to Erzhu Rong.

Upon hearing the news of the surrender, Empress Dowager Hu ordered all of Emperor Xiaoming's consorts to become nuns. She herself took tonsure as well, but did not declare herself a nun. Erzhu ordered the imperial officials to welcome Emperor Xiaozhuang into the capital, and the officials complied. Erzhu then sent cavalry soldiers to arrest Empress Dowager Hu and Yuan Zhao and deliver them to his camp at Heyin (河陰, near Luoyang). Once Empress Dowager Hu met Erzhu, she tried to repeatedly explain and defend her actions. Erzhu became impatient of her explanations, and he left abruptly and ordered that Empress Dowager Hu and Yuan Zhao be thrown into the Yellow River to drown.

Empress Dowager Hu and Yuan Zhao would not be Erzhu's only victims. Fei suggested to Erzhu that since his army was actually small, as soon as the imperial officials realized the situation, they would resist him. He suggested that Erzhu carry out a massacre of the imperial officials, and Erzhu, despite the opposition of his strategist Murong Shaozong, proceeded. Erzhu ordered the imperial officials to his camp at Heyin (河陰, near Luoyang) under the pretense that Emperor Xiaozhuang was going to offer sacrifices to heaven and earth there, and surrounded the imperial officials, slaughtering over 2,000 of them, including Emperor Xiaozhuang's uncle, the prime minister Yuan Yong the Prince of Gaoyang. Erzhu also sent soldiers to assassinate Yuan Shao and Yuan Zizheng, while putting Emperor Xiaozhuang under effective arrest in the army camp.

Emperor Xiaozhuang, in fear and anger, sent a messenger to Erzhu, suggesting that he would be willing to yield the throne, either to Erzhu or to yet another person that Erzhu designated. Erzhu, under suggestion of Gao Huan, contemplated taking the throne himself or offering it to Yuan Tianmu, himself a member of the imperial clan, albeit distant from the recent emperors' lineage. Subsequently, however, his sorcerer Liu Lingzhu (劉靈助) predicted that neither Erzhu himself nor Yuan Tianmu were favored to be emperor by the gods, and that only Emperor Xiaozhuang was favored. Erzhu therefore stopped those plans and offered an apology to Emperor Xiaozhuang, claiming that the massacre was a result of the soldiers going out of control. However, the people of Luoyang and the surviving imperial officials, fearful of further massacre, fled Luoyang, leaving it nearly empty, particularly because Erzhu publicly pondered the idea of moving the capital to Jinyang (晉陽, in modern Taiyuan, Shanxi). It was not until Erzhu offered offices to the heirs of the officials who died and publicly renounced the idea of moving the capital that the people began to return to Luoyang.

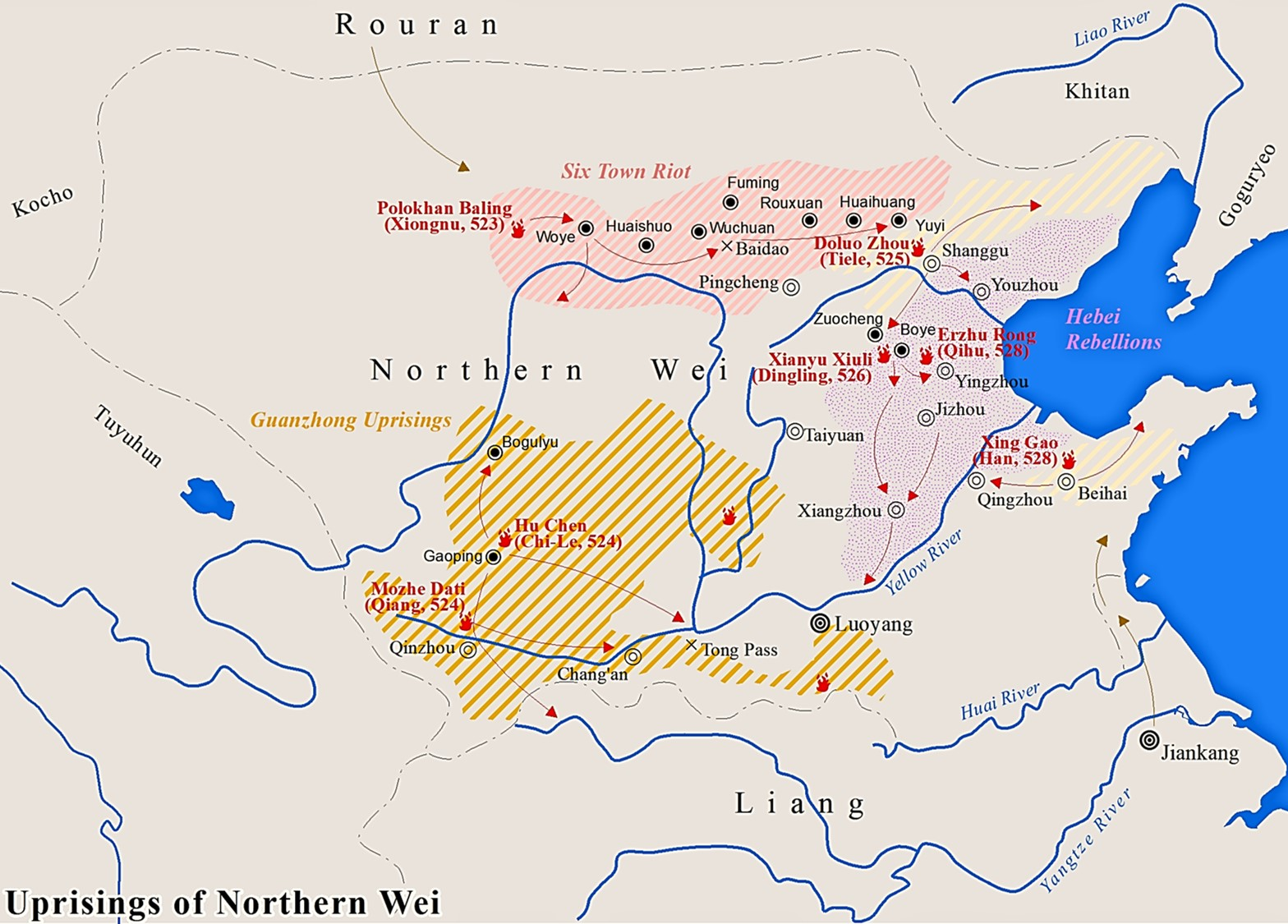
Location of Erzhu Rong's rebellion

== During Emperor Xiaozhuang's reign ==
Nevertheless, Erzhu Rong, while publicly returning authority to Emperor Xiaozhuang, retained command of the armed forces, while putting several officials closely aligned with him, including Yuan Tianmu and his cousin Erzhu Shilong, into high positions, and kept a close watch on Emperor Xiaozhuang even though he was largely away from the capital. He also wanted Emperor Xiaozhuang to marry his daughter as his empress. Because this constituted incest under Confucian traditions, Emperor Xiaozhuang hesitated, but under the suggestion of the official Zu Ying (祖瑩), who advised that this marriage would be advantageous, Emperor Xiaozhuang agreed.

Emperor Xiaozhuang was said to be diligent in governmental matters, and even though Erzhu was not particularly pleased with the development, Emperor Xiaozhuang proceeded to take much interest in criminal matters, as well as refusing to comply with all of Erzhu's recommendations for officials. He did not dare to directly cross Erzhu, however, and Erzhu continued to install officials close to him in the imperial administration.

Meanwhile, Erzhu proceeded to try to reunify the empire, which had been largely divided by agrarian rebellions that rose during the reign of Emperor Xiaoming. At that time, the more major rebels included:

- Ge Rong, with an army largely of Xianbei soldiers from the six garrisons on the northern borders, with the title of Emperor of Qi and controlling most of the provinces in modern Hebei
- Xing Gao, with an army largely consisting of refugees from Ge Rong's and other associated rebellions, with the title of Prince of Han and controlling most of the provinces in modern Shandong
- Moqi Chounu, with the title of emperor and controlling most of the provinces in Shaanxi and eastern Gansu

Erzhu's first target was Ge, who had put the important city Yecheng under siege and was getting close to the Yellow River. With just 7,000 cavalry soldiers, Erzhu caught the much larger Ge army by surprise and crushed it, capturing Ge and delivering him to Luoyang, where Ge was executed in winter 528. Ge's general Han Lou (韓樓) took part of his army and took over modern Beijing and Tianjin.

Around the same time, rival Liang dynasty's Emperor Wu created Emperor Xiaozhuang's cousin Yuan Hao the Prince of Beihai, who had fled to Liang following the Heyin Massacre, the Prince of Wei and sent an army commanded by the general Chen Qingzhi to escort him, with an intent to install Yuan Hao as Northern Wei's emperor as a vassal state to Liang. Emperor Xiaozhuang's administration did not consider Yuan Hao a serious threat at the moment, and instead sent a large army, commanded by Yuan Tianmu and Erzhu Rong's nephew Erzhu Zhao, to attack Xing first. Xing was captured and executed in summer 529, but Chen and Yuan Hao, who declared himself the emperor of Northern Wei upon entering Northern Wei territory, took the opportunity to capture Yingyang (滎陽, in modern Zhengzhou, Henan), defeating Yuan Tianmu as he returned from the campaign against Xing, and approached Luoyang. Emperor Xiaozhuang decided to flee Luoyang, and he crossed the Yellow River to rendezvous with Erzhu Rong and Yuan Tianmu at Zhangzi (長子, in modern Changzhi, Shanxi). Meanwhile, Yuan Hao entered Luoyang unopposed, and the provinces south of the Yellow River largely declared allegiance to Yuan Hao.

Yuan Hao, however, believed that he had already succeeded and began to plot against Chen and his Liang forces, wanting to throw off Liang's control. He therefore sent messengers to persuade Liang's Emperor Wu not to send any additional reinforcements. Erzhu's forces, meanwhile, were stymied against Chen, but eventually Erzhu made an attack at night and crossed the Yellow River, causing Yuan Hao's forces to collapse, and while Chen tried to withdraw, his army was defeated as well. Yuan Hao was killed in flight, and Emperor Xiaozhuang again entered Luoyang to assume the throne.

In spring 530, Erzhu Rong sent his nephew Erzhu Tianguang, assisted by the generals Heba Yue and Houmochen Yue, to attack Moqi Chounu. Erzhu Tianguang, after tricking Moqi into believing that an attack would not come quickly, made a surprise attack, defeating Moqi and capturing him. He then captured Moqi's capital Gaoping (高平, in modern Guyuan, Ningxia), capturing Moqi's general Xiao Baoyin – a former major Northern Wei general and Southern Qi prince who had, during Emperor Xiaoming's reign unsuccessfully tried to reestablish Southern Qi. Moqi was executed, and while many officials friendly with Xiao tried to plead for Xiao's life, Emperor Xiaozhuang ordered Xiao to commit suicide. Erzhu Tianguang subsequently defeated another major rebel, Wang Qingyun (王慶雲), and Moqi Chounu's general Moqi Daoluo (万俟道洛), largely pacifying the western empire. Soon thereafter, Erzhu Rong's generals Hou Yuan (侯淵) and Liu Lingzhu defeated and killed Han Lou, and the empire became basically reunified.

== Death ==
However, Emperor Xiaozhuang was secretly unhappy about these victories by the Erzhu forces, believing that this made an usurpation by Erzhu Rong closer to reality. Inside his own palace, he felt under pressure by the jealous Empress Erzhu. Erzhu Rong gave hints that he wanted to be awarded the nine bestowments – symbols of great honor that usually preceded usurpations, and Emperor Xiaozhuang pretended not to understand, and did not bestow the nine bestowments on Erzhu. Yuan Hui (元徽) the Prince of Chengyang, the husband of Emperor Xiaozhuang's cousin, and Li Yu (李彧), Emperor Xiaozhuang's brother-in-law, both wanted more power, and saw the Erzhus as in their way, and therefore persuaded Emperor Xiaozhuang that one day Erzhu Rong would indeed usurp the throne. Emperor Xiaozhuang also feared a repeat of the Heyin Massacre, and therefore engaged his officials Yang Kan (楊侃) and Yuan Luo (元羅) in the conspiracy as well.

In fall 530, with Empress Erzhu pregnant, Erzhu Rong requested to come to the capital to attend to his daughter for childbirth. Emperor Xiaozhuang's associates were divided in their opinions—some wanted to assassinate Erzhu when he came to the palace, and some wanted to slaughter Erzhu's associates in the capital and militarily resist. Emperor Xiaozhuang hesitated and did not take any actions initially. Meanwhile, Erzhu Shilong heard rumors of Emperor Xiaozhuang's conspiracy and reported them to Erzhu Rong, but Erzhu Rong did not believe that Emperor Xiaozhuang would dare to turn against him and therefore arrived at Luoyang anyway. The populace of Luoyang expected either Erzhu Rong to carry out a coup or Emperor Xiaozhuang to act against him, and many fled. When Erzhu arrived at the capital, however, he entered the palace with minimal guards and without weapons, and so Emperor Xiaozhuang considered not acting against him. Yuan Hui, however, persuaded Emperor Xiaozhuang that even if Erzhu Rong was not planning a coup, that he still should not be allowed to be left alive.

Emperor Xiaozhuang feared, however, that Yuan Tianmu, who was then at Jinyang, would be a latent threat, and therefore summoned Yuan Tianmu to the capital as well. Meanwhile, with rumors that Erzhu was planning to arrest Emperor Xiaozhuang and move the capital to Jinyang, Emperor Xiaozhuang became even more apprehensive and anxious to carry out the plot. He studied the historical accounts of the Han dynasty general Dong Zhuo, and concluded that Wang Yun's failure, after he killed Dong, was in not pardoning Dong's associates and forcing them into rebellion. He therefore prepared to first kill Erzhu Rong and then declaring a general pardon. Under pretense that Empress Erzhu had given birth, he summoned Erzhu Rong and Yuan Tianmu into the palace and surprised and killed them; Erzhu Rong's son Erzhu Puti (爾朱菩提), who was 14 years old at the time, and Erzhu's attendants were also killed. The populace rejoiced upon hearing news of Erzhu Rong's death, except for Erzhu Rong's wife the Princess Beixiang. (Note: The Wei Shu recorded that Erzhu Rong's wife was the paternal aunt of Yuan Lve, Prince Wenzhen of Dongping (东平文贞王), and Yuan Ning, Prince of Dong'an (东安王), and thus a daughter of Yuan Zhen, Prince Hui of Nan'an (南安惠王). This is in contrast to Hu Sanxing's assertion that the Princess Beixiang was not from the Yuan clan, but was created princess in recognition of Erzhu's achievements. Erzhu Rong's biography in Wei Shu, and vol.154 of Zizhi Tongjian also recorded that the Princess Beixiang warned her husband not to go to the palace; Erzhu ignored her.) (Note: The princess's title was recorded as "Elder Princess of Xiang" (乡郡长公主) in Emperor Xiaozhuang's biography (vol.10) in Book of Wei. In his annotations to Zizhi Tongjian, Hu Sanxing noted that Tongjian used the title "Elder Princess of Beixiang" to refer to Erzhu Rong's wife, despite Sima Guang noting in his Zizhi Tongjian Kaoyi that Tongjian would be using "Elder Princess of Xiang" (per Emperor Xiaozhuang's biography in Book of Wei); Hu opinioned that the discrepancy could have been caused by errors while copying manuscripts.) Eventually, the Erzhu clan members, led by Erzhu Shilong and Erzhu Zhao, gathered with their armies, and defeated and killed Emperor Xiaozhuang. When they subsequently made Yuan Gong the Prince of Guangling emperor (as Emperor Jiemin), Erzhu Rong was posthumously honored the Prince of Jin, with the posthumous name Wu (武, "martial"), and enshrined in the shrine of Emperor Xiaowen. Erzhu Shilong also converted the temple of the Duke of Zhou to be a temple of Erzhu Rong. After the Erzhus were defeated and overthrown by Gao Huan in 532, much of the honor given to Erzhu Rong was removed, but Erzhu Rong was never personally denounced, as Gao had been a subordinate of his and subsequently took Lady Erzhu as a concubine.

Wei Shou had these comments about Erzhu Rong:

Erzhu Rong was a general of the empire who depended on the loyalty his subordinates had for him. Suzong's [Emperor Xiaoming's temple name] death by poisoning incurred the wrath of the people and the gods alike. He thus had great ambitions of saving the weak, and his campaign to reestablish the old dynasty and banish evils, had its door opened by Heaven. At that time, the hearts and minds of the people were lost, and the morales of officials and generals have collapsed, and people hoped that someone would express the voice of the righteous, to start a just uprising, like Duke Huan of Qi and Duke Wen of Jin. Indeed, Erzhu Rong easily succeeded, with his warhorses not even sweating, and both the government and the people followed him. He placed a prince on the throne to allow the government to have a sovereign, and he allowed the imperial ancestors to be worshipped along with Heaven. The traditions of the empire were not destroyed. Thereafter, he captured Ge Rong, killed Yuan Hao, executed Xing Gao, cut short Han Lou's life, and both Moqi Chounu and Xiao Baoyin were taken to the execution field to be beheaded. These rebel leaders seized regions and were not minor thieves who captured just singular cities or villages. Without Erzhu Rong's full efforts to eliminate these disasters, many people would have claim kingships and many peoples would have claim imperial thrones. Were not Erzhu Rong's achievements great? But from the very beginning, he had improper thoughts and wanted to seize the throne, and he threw Empress Hu and the Young Lord [Yuan Zhao] into the Yellow River. At the massacre of Heyin, all of the honored officials were massacred. These were the reasons why he was condemned by men and gods, and was finally killed. If Erzhu Rong did not commit errors of treachery and cruelty, but instead encouraged himself with virtues and righteousness, then how could even Yi Yin (Note: legendary great prime minister of Shang dynasty) or Huo Guang compare to him? But even at the end, even though he did not carry out acts of treason, he was suspected and died violently and suddenly. This is why Kuai Che [蒯徹] persuaded Han Xin to rebel.
