= Emperor Xiaozhuang of Northern Wei =

Emperor Xiaozhuang of Northern Wei 北魏孝莊帝
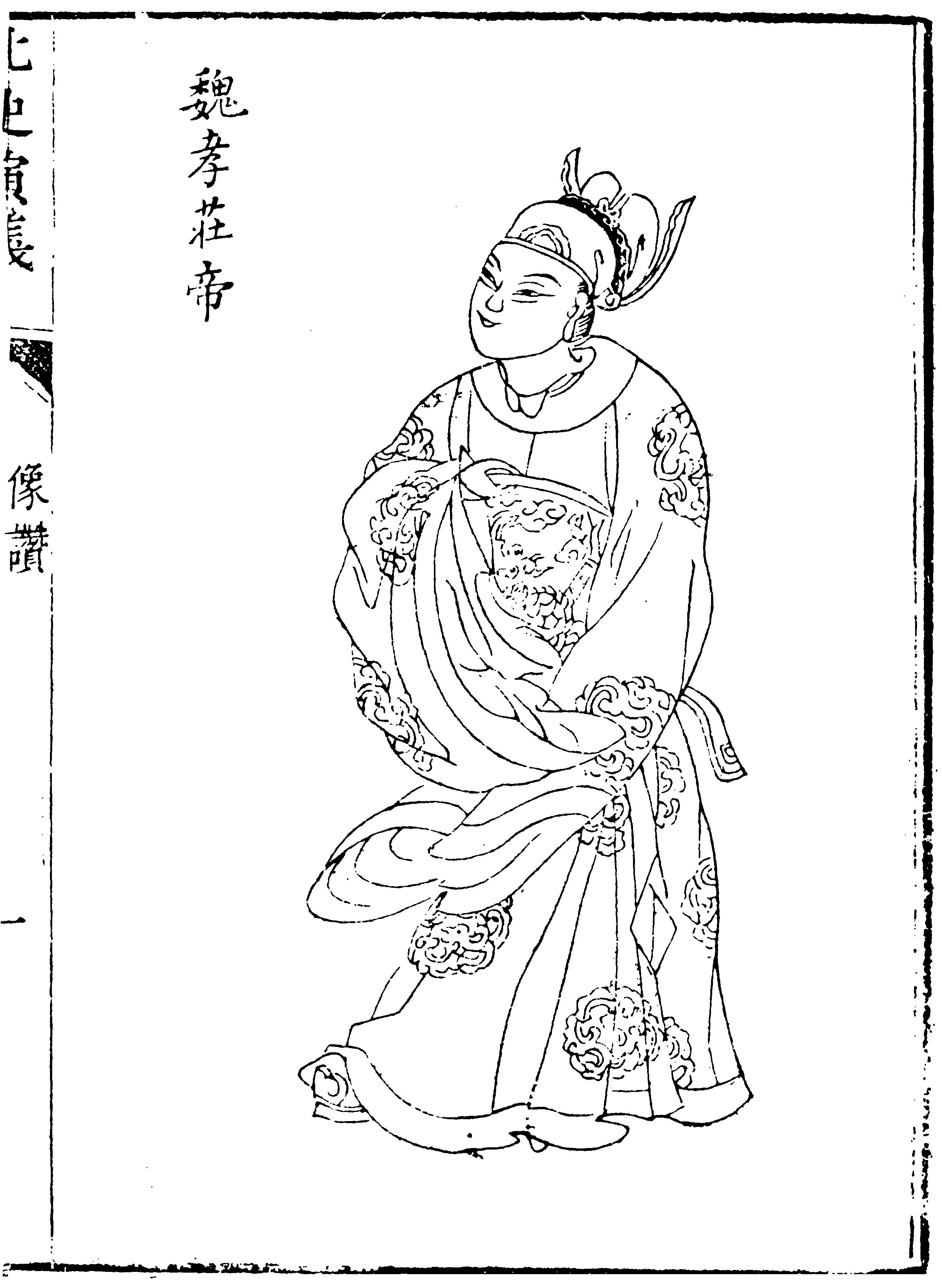

Emperor of Northern Wei
- Reign: May 15, 528 – January 6, 531
- Predecessor: Yuan Zhao
- Successor: Yuan Ye
- Born: 507
- Died: January 26, 531
- Burial: Jing Mausoleum (靜陵)
Names
- Family name: Yuán (元); Given name: Zǐyōu (子攸)
Era dates
- Jiàn yì (建義) 528; Yǒng ān (永安) 528-530
Posthumous name
- Initially Emperor Wuhuai (武懷皇帝), later Emperor Xiaozhuang (孝莊皇帝)
Temple name
- Jingzong (敬宗)
- House: Yuan
- Dynasty: Northern Wei

Emperor Xiaozhuang of Northern Wei (Chinese: (北)魏孝莊帝, 507 – 26 January 531; (Note: According to Emperor Xiaozhuang's biography in Book of Wei, he was 24 (by East Asian reckoning) when he died on the jiazi day of the 12th month of the 3rd year of the Yong'an era of his reign; the date corresponds to 26 Jan 531 in the Julian calendar. His biography in Bei Shi used the term "shi" (弑) to indicate that he was killed.) r. May 528 – Jan 531), personal name Yuan Ziyou (Chinese: 元子攸), courtesy name Yanda (彥達), was an emperor of China's Northern Wei dynasty. He was placed on the throne by General Erzhu Rong, who refused to recognize the young emperor, Yuan Zhao, who Empress Dowager Hu had placed on the throne after she poisoned her son Emperor Xiaoming.

During his reign, General Erzhu largely controlled the military and acted in a violent manner, leading Emperor Xiaozhuang to believe that he would usurp the throne. In late 530, Emperor Xiaozhuang ambushed General Erzhu and killed him in the palace, but his cousin Erzhu Shilong and nephew Erzhu Zhao subsequently captured and killed Xiaozhuang.

== Early life ==
Yuan Ziyou was born in 507, during the reign of his cousin Emperor Xuanwu, as the third son of the highly regarded imperial prince, Emperor Xuanwu's uncle Yuan Xie the Prince of Pengcheng. His mother was Yuan Xie's wife Princess Li Yuanhua, the daughter of the honored official Li Chong (李沖). Of his two older brothers, the oldest, Yuan Zizhi (元子直), was not Princess Li's son, and the other, born of Princess Li, was Yuan Shao (元劭).

In 508, Princess Li was again pregnant and due to give birth, when Emperor Xuanwu, believing in false accusations of his maternal uncle Gao Zhao that Yuan Xie was plotting rebellion, forced Yuan Xie to commit suicide. Princess Li soon gave birth to Yuan Ziyou's younger brother, Yuan Zizheng (元子正). It appeared that Yuan Ziyou was close to his brothers. Yuan Shao, as the oldest son of Yuan Xie's wife, inherited Yuan Xie's title of Prince of Pengcheng. Yuan Ziyou and his brothers Yuan Zizhi and Yuan Zizheng were created dukes—in Yuan Ziyou's case, the Duke of Wucheng. (Note: Emperor Xiaozhuang's biography in the Book of Wei recorded that it was Emperor Xuanwu who created Yuan Ziyou (and thus, implicitly, Yuan Zizhi and Yuan Zizheng) duke. But, Yuan Xie's biography in the same work recorded that it was Empress Dowager Hu.) Yuan Ziyou, in his youth, served as an attendant to Emperor Xuanwu, and was praised for his intelligence and handsome looks. He held increasingly higher offices during the reigns of Emperor Xuanwu and his son and successor Emperor Xiaoming.

In 526, Emperor Xuanwu's son and successor Emperor Xiaoming promoted Yuan Ziyou to be the Prince of Changle. In 527, however, he lost all actual authority (although he retained honorific offices) when Yuan Shao was suspected of plotting a rebellion and was reported by Yuan Yanming (元延明) the Prince of Anfeng. Emperor Xiaoming and his mother, Empress Dowager Hu, however, did not kill either Yuan Ziyou or his brothers.

In 528, Emperor Xiaoming, who was having increasing friction with Empress Dowager Hu, conspired with the general Erzhu Rong to have Erzhu advance on the capital Luoyang to force Empress Dowager Hu to yield power and to kill her lover Zheng Yan (鄭儼) and Zheng's associate Xu Ge (徐紇). The conspiracy was discovered, and Empress Dowager Hu poisoned the emperor and made Yuan Zhao, a two-year-old son of an imperial prince, emperor. Erzhu refused to recognize Yuan Zhao as emperor and advanced on Luoyang. Because Yuan Xie's memory remained highly regarded by the people, and Yuan Ziyou was renowned for his abilities, Erzhu sent secret messengers to make overtures to him, offering to make him emperor. Yuan Ziyou agreed, and when Erzhu advanced to Luoyang's vicinity, Yuan Ziyou, along with Yuan Shao and Yuan Zizheng, fled Luoyang and joined Erzhu's army. Erzhu proclaimed him emperor (as Emperor Xiaozhuang), and there was much rejoicing in the army ranks.

== Reign in coordination with Erzhu Rong ==
Emperor Xiaozhuang made Yuan Shao the Wushang Prince (無上王, meaning "prince without anyone greater") and Yuan Zizheng, who was Duke of Bacheng, the Prince of Shiping. He invested Erzhu Rong with a variety of supreme military and civilian titles, and created him the title Prince of Taiyuan.

=== The Heyin Massacre and aftermath ===
Upon hearing of Emperor Xiaozhuang's ascension, Empress Dowager Hu's generals Zheng Xianhu (鄭先護), a friend of Emperor Xiaozhuang, and Fei Mu (費穆), quickly surrendered, while another general, Li Shengui (李神軌), fled. Zheng Yan and Xu Ge also deserted Luoyang. Empress Dowager Hu became desperate; after ordering Emperor Xiaoming's consorts to all become Buddhist nuns, she took tonsure herself although she did not declare herself a nun.

Erzhu ordered the imperial officials to welcome Emperor Xiaozhuang into Luoyang while sending cavalry to arrest Empress Dowager Hu and Yuan Zhao. After a meeting with Empress Dowager Hu, in which she tried to defend her actions but drew no sympathy from Erzhu, Erzhu had her and Yuan Zhao thrown into the Yellow River to drown.

Empress Dowager Hu and Yuan Zhao would not be Erzhu's only victims, however. Fei suggested to Erzhu that since his army was actually small, as soon as the imperial officials realized the situation, they would resist him. He suggested that Erzhu carry out a massacre of the imperial officials, and Erzhu, despite the opposition of his strategist Murong Shaozong, proceeded. Erzhu ordered the imperial officials to his camp at Heyin (河陰, near Luoyang) under the pretense that Emperor Xiaozhuang was going to offer sacrifices to heaven and earth there, and then surrounded the imperial officials and slaughtered them, killing more than 2,000 of them, including Emperor Xiaozhuang's uncle, the prime minister Yuan Yong the Prince of Gaoyang. Erzhu also sent soldiers to assassinate Yuan Shao and Yuan Zizheng, while putting Emperor Xiaozhuang under effective arrest in the army camp.

Emperor Xiaozhuang, in fear and anger, sent a messenger to Erzhu, suggesting that he would be willing to yield the throne either to Erzhu or to another person that Erzhu designated. Erzhu, under suggestion of his general Gao Huan, toyed with the idea of taking the throne himself or offering it to his close associate Yuan Tianmu, a distant relative of Emperor Xiaozhuang. Subsequently, however, his sorcerer Liu Lingzhu (劉靈助) predicted that neither Erzhu himself nor Yuan Tianmu was favored to be an emperor by the gods, and that only Emperor Xiaozhuang was favored. Erzhu therefore stopped these plans and offered a deep apology to Emperor Xiaozhuang, claiming that the massacre was a result of the soldiers going out of control. However, the people of Luoyang and the surviving imperial officials, fearful of further massacre, fled Luoyang, which was then left nearly empty, particularly because Erzhu publicly pondered the idea of moving the capital to Jinyang (晉陽, in modern Taiyuan, Shanxi). It was not until Erzhu offered offices to the heirs of the officials who died and publicly renounced the idea of moving the capital that the people began to return to Luoyang.

Nevertheless, Erzhu, while publicly returning authority to Emperor Xiaozhuang, retained command of the armed forces, while putting several officials closely aligned with him, including Yuan Tianmu and his cousin Erzhu Shilong, into high positions. He kept a close watch on Emperor Xiaozhuang even though he was largely away from the capital. He also wanted Emperor Xiaozhuang to marry his daughter Lady Erzhu, who had previously been Emperor Xiaoming's concubine, as his empress. Because this match constituted incest under Confucian standards, Emperor Xiaozhuang hesitated, but under the suggestion of the official Zu Ying (祖瑩), who advised that this marriage would be advantageous, Emperor Xiaozhuang agreed.

=== Subsequent reunification of the empire ===
Emperor Xiaozhuang was said to be diligent in governmental matters, and even though Erzhu was not particularly pleased with the development, Emperor Xiaozhuang proceeded to take much interest in criminal matters, as well as refusing to comply with all of Erzhu's recommendations for officials. He did not dare to directly cross Erzhu, however, and Erzhu continued to install officials close to him in the imperial administration.

Meanwhile, Erzhu proceeded to try to reunify the empire, which had been largely divided by agrarian rebellions that rose during the reign of Emperor Xiaoming. At that time, the more major rebels included:

- Ge Rong, with an army largely of Xianbei soldiers from the six garrisons on the northern borders, with the title of Emperor of Qi and controlling most of the provinces in modern Hebei
- Xing Gao, with an army largely consisting of refugees from Ge Rong's and other associated rebellions, with the title of Prince of Han and controlling most of the provinces in modern Shandong
- Moqi Chounu, with the title of emperor and controlling most of the provinces in Shaanxi and eastern Gansu

Erzhu's first target was Ge, who had put the important city Yecheng under siege and was getting close to the Yellow River. With just 7,000 cavalry soldiers, Erzhu caught the much larger Ge army by surprise and crushed it, capturing Ge and delivering him to Luoyang, where Ge was executed in winter 528. Ge's general Han Lou (韓樓) took party of his army and took over modern Beijing and Tianjin.

In spring 529, Emperor Xiaozhuang posthumously honored his father Yuan Xie as Emperor Wenmu and his mother Princess Li as Empress Wenmu, and enshrined them in the imperial ancestral temple, despite opposition by Yuan Yu (元彧) the Prince of Linhuai as being inappropriate since Yuan Xie was never actually emperor. He further also posthumously honored his brother Yuan Shao as Emperor Xiaoxuan and Yuan Shao's wife Princess Li as Empress Wengong, although he did not enshrine them in the imperial temple.

Around the same time, rival Liang dynasty's Emperor Wu created Emperor Xiaozhuang's cousin Yuan Hao the Prince of Beihai, who had fled to Liang following the Heyin Massacre, the Prince of Wei and sent an army commanded by the general Chen Qingzhi to escort him, with an intent to install Yuan Hao as Northern Wei's emperor as a vassal state to Liang. Emperor Xiaozhuang's administration did not consider Yuan Hao a serious threat at the moment, and instead sent a large army, commanded by Yuan Tianmu and Erzhu Rong's nephew Erzhu Zhao, to attack Xing first. Xing was captured and executed in summer 529, but Chen and Yuan Hao, who declared himself the emperor of Northern Wei upon entering Northern Wei territory, took the opportunity to capture Yingyang (滎陽, in modern Zhengzhou, Henan), defeating Yuan Tianmu as he returned from the campaign against Xing, and approached Luoyang. Emperor Xiaozhuang decided to flee Luoyang, and he crossed the Yellow River to rendezvous with Erzhu Rong and Yuan Tianmu at Zhangzi (長子, in modern Changzhi, Shanxi). Meanwhile, Yuan Hao entered Luoyang unopposed, and the provinces south of the Yellow River largely declared allegiance to Yuan Hao.

Yuan Hao, however, believed that he had already succeeded and began to plot against Chen and his Liang forces, wanting to throw off Liang's control. He therefore sent messengers to persuade Liang's Emperor Wu not to send any additional reinforcements. Erzhu's forces, meanwhile, were stymied against Chen, but eventually Erzhu made an attack at night and crossed the Yellow River, causing Yuan Hao's forces to collapse, and while Chen tried to withdraw, his army was defeated as well. Yuan Hao was killed in flight, and Emperor Xiaozhuang again entered Luoyang to assume the throne.

In spring 530, Erzhu Rong sent his nephew Erzhu Tianguang, assisted by the generals Heba Yue and Houmochen Yue, to attack Moqi Chounu. Erzhu Tianguang, after tricking Moqi into believing that an attack would not come quickly, made a surprise attack, defeating Moqi and capturing him. He then captured Moqi's capital Gaoping (高平, in modern Guyuan, Ningxia), capturing Moqi's general Xiao Baoyin—a former major Northern Wei general and Southern Qi prince who had, during Emperor Xiaoming's reign, unsuccessfully tried to reestablish Southern Qi. Moqi was executed, and while many officials friendly with Xiao tried to plead for Xiao's life, Emperor Xiaozhuang ordered Xiao to commit suicide. Erzhu Tianguang subsequently defeated another major rebel, Wang Qingyun (王慶雲), and Moqi Chounu's general Moqi Daoluo (万俟道洛), largely pacifying the western empire. Soon thereafter, Erzhu Rong's generals Hou Yuan (侯淵) and Liu Lingzhu defeated and killed Han Lou, and the empire became basically reunified.

== Killing of Erzhu Rong ==
However, Emperor Xiaozhuang was secretly unhappy about these victories by the Erzhu forces, believing that this made an usurpation by Erzhu Rong closer to reality. Inside his own palace, he felt under pressure by the jealous Empress Erzhu. Erzhu Rong gave hints that he wanted to be awarded the nine bestowments—symbols of great honor that usually preceded usurpations—but Emperor Xiaozhuang pretended not to understand, and did not bestow the nine bestowments on Erzhu. Yuan Hui (元徽) the Prince of Chengyang, the husband of Emperor Xiaozhuang's cousin, and Li Yu (李彧), Emperor Xiaozhuang's brother-in-law, both wanted more power, and saw the Erzhus as in their way, and therefore persuaded Emperor Xiaozhuang that one day Erzhu Rong would indeed usurp the throne. Emperor Xiaozhuang also feared a repeat of the Heyin Massacre, and therefore engaged his officials Yang Kan (楊侃) and Yuan Luo (元羅) in the conspiracy as well.

In autumn 530, with Empress Erzhu pregnant, Erzhu Rong requested to come to the capital to attend to his daughter for childbirth. Emperor Xiaozhuang's associates were divided in their opinions—some wanted to assassinate Erzhu when he came to the palace, and some wanted to slaughter Erzhu's associates in the capital and militarily resist. Emperor Xiaozhuang hesitated and did not take any actions initially. Meanwhile, Erzhu Shilong heard rumors of Emperor Xiaozhuang's conspiracy and reported them to Erzhu Rong, but Erzhu Rong did not believe that Emperor Xiaozhuang would dare to turn against him and therefore went to Luoyang anyway. The populace of Luoyang expected that either Erzhu Rong would carry out a coup or Emperor Xiaozhuang would act against him, and many fled. When Erzhu arrived at the capital, however, he entered the palace with minimal guards and without weapons, and so Emperor Xiaozhuang considered not acting against him. Yuan Hui, however, persuaded Emperor Xiaozhuang that even if Erzhu Rong was not planning a coup, that he still should not be allowed to be left alive.

Emperor Xiaozhuang feared, however, that Yuan Tianmu, who was then at Jinyang, would be a latent threat, and therefore summoned Yuan Tianmu to the capital as well. Meanwhile, with rumors that Erzhu was planning to arrest Emperor Xiaozhuang and move the capital to Jinyang, Emperor Xiaozhuang became even more apprehensive and anxious to carry out the plot. He studied the historical accounts of the Han dynasty general Dong Zhuo, and concluded that Wang Yun's failure, after he killed Dong, was in not pardoning Dong's associates, forcing them into rebellion. He therefore prepared first to kill Erzhu Rong and then to declare a general pardon. Under pretense that Empress Erzhu had given birth, he summoned Erzhu Rong and Yuan Tianmu into the palace and surprised and killed them. Also killed were Erzhu Rong's eldest son Erzhu Puti (爾朱菩提), who was 14 years old at the time, and Erzhu's attendants. The populace rejoiced at the news of Erzhu Rong's death, but Erzhu Rong's wife the Princess Beixiang (Note: In his annotations to Zizhi Tongjian, Hu Sanxing wrote that the Princess Beixiang was not from the Yuan clan, but was created princess in recognition of Erzhu's achievements. However, this contradicts the Wei Shu, which recorded that Erzhu Rong's wife was the paternal aunt of Yuan Lve, Prince Wenzhen of Dongping (东平文贞王), and Yuan Ning, Prince of Dong'an (东安王), and thus a daughter of Yuan Zhen, Prince Hui of Nan'an (南安惠王). Hu also noted that Tongjian used the title "Elder Princess of Beixiang" to refer to Erzhu Rong's wife, despite Sima Guang noting in his Zizhi Tongjian Kaoyi that Tongjian would be using "Elder Princess of Xiang" (per Emperor Xiaozhuang's biography in Book of Wei); Hu opinioned that the discrepancy could have been caused by errors while copying manuscripts.) and Erzhu Shilong fought their way out of the capital, initially camping at Heyin and demonstrating their military strength.

== The campaign against the Erzhus ==
Emperor Xiaozhuang sent messengers to Erzhu Shilong, declaring a general pardon, and issuing an "iron certificate" (鐵券, tie quan, which could be used against a death-eligible crime) to Erzhu Shilong if he would be willing to give up resisting. Erzhu Shilong refused, declaring that if Erzhu Rong could be killed after accomplishing so much, the certificate was meaningless. While Emperor Xiaozhuang's army was larger than Erzhu Shilong's, it was not as well-trained and could not decisively defeat Erzhu Shilong's. During this campaign, Empress Erzhu bore a son, and Emperor Xiaozhuang declared a general pardon. Erzhu Shilong eventually withdrew from Luoyang and joined the army of Erzhu Zhao, which advanced south from Jinyang after Erzhu Zhao heard of Erzhu Rong's death. They rendezvoused at Zhangzi and declared a distant relative of Emperor Xiaozhuang's, Yuan Ye the Prince of Changguang, emperor. Meanwhile, Erzhu Tianguang also headed toward Luoyang, while claiming to be still supportive of Emperor Xiaozhuang.

Meanwhile, Erzhu Zhao, after meeting Erzhu Shilong, quickly advanced on Luoyang. Around the new year 531, he had his army ride on horseback across the Yellow River, catching Emperor Xiaozhuang, who did not expect Erzhu Zhao to be able to cross the river easily, by surprise. Emperor Xiaozhuang's imperial guards collapsed, and he was captured by Erzhu Zhao's cavalry soldiers and imprisoned, less than three months after he killed Erzhu Rong. Erzhu Zhao killed Emperor Xiaozhuang's infant son, while allowing his soldiers to pillage Luoyang, killing many officials and raping many honored women.

== Death ==
12 days after capturing Emperor Xiaozhuang, Erzhu Zhao had him delivered to Jinyang. While he was on the way, Gao Huan, who had been considering rebelling against Erzhu Zhao, considered a rescue mission to intercept Emperor Xiaozhuang's train, but missed the timing. Gao sent a letter to Erzhu Zhao, advising him not to kill the emperor, lest that he gained the ruinous reputation for having murdered an emperor. Erzhu Zhao, in anger, refused to accept Gao's advice. Emperor Xiaozhuang was imprisoned in a Buddhist temple in Jinyang, and 10 days after he left Luoyang, Erzhu Zhao had him strangled. He was not given a proper imperial burial until Gao overthrew the Erzhus in 532.

== Family ==
=== Consorts and issue ===
- Empress, of the Erzhu clan (皇后 爾朱氏; d. 556), second cousin once removed, personal name Ying'e (英娥)
  - Unnamed son (530)

== Notes ==
Regnal titles
Preceded by Yuan Zhao	Emperor of Northern Wei; 528–530	Succeeded by Yuan Ye (Prince of Changguang)
