= Ng (name) =

Ng (pronounced [ŋ̍]) is the simplified (tone-less) romanization of the Cantonese surnames 吳/吴 (Jyutping: Ng4, read in Mandarin as pinyin: Wú) and 伍 (Ng5, Mandarin Wǔ); and also of the Hokkien surnames 黃/黄 (Pe̍h-ōe-jī: N̂ɡ, Mandarin Huáng) and 阮 (Ńg, Mandarin Ruǎn).

The surname is often pronounced in English as /əŋ/ əng or /ɪŋ/ ing or /ɛŋ/ eng. It is sometimes romanized as Ang, Eng, Ing and Ong in the United States, and as Ung in Australia. In Cambodia, the corresponding surname is Oeng.

== Notable people with the surname Ng ==
=== Chinese character spelling unknown ===
- Clive Ng (born 1962), media sector financier and executive
- Evelyn Ng (born 1975), Canadian professional poker player
- Fae Myenne Ng (born 1956), American novelist
- Geeling Ng, New Zealand model, actress and restaurateur
- Heok Hee Ng, Singaporean biologist
- Jacob Ng (born 1994), Australian professional boxer
- John Ng (born 1950), Chinese martial arts instructor
- Eden (Irish musician) (born Jonathon Ng, 1995), Irish singer-songwriter
- Kelvin Ng (born 1958), Canadian politician
- Lenhard Ng (born 1976), American mathematician

=== Chinese character spelling 吳 ===
- Ng Mui, said to have been one of the legendary Five Elders
- Andrew Ng (born 1976), British-born American computer scientist and technology entrepreneur
- Antonio Ng (born 1957), Chinese politician
- Carl Ng (born 1976), Hong Kong actor and model
- Charles Ng (born 1960), Hong Kong born serial killer
- Charles Ng Wang-wai, civil engineer and academic
- Ng Ching-fai (born 1939), Chinese academic
- Ng Chiu Kok (born 1975), Football referee and government official
- Deep Ng (born 1983), Hong Kong singer-songwriter and actor
- Dominic Ng (born 1959), American banker
- Dora Ng, Hong Kong film costume and make up designer
- Elaine Ng (born 1972), Hong Kong actress and beauty pageant titleholder
- Francis Ng (born 1961), Hong Kong actor and director
- Hiu Lui Ng (c. 1975–2008), New Yorker who died while in the custody of U.S. Immigration and Customs Enforcement
- James Ng (born 1990), Hong Kong singer and actor
- Jeannette Ng, Hong Kong-born British fantasy author
- John Lone (born Ng Kwok-leung, 1952), American actor
- Jinny Ng (born 1992), Hong Kong singer, hostess and actress
- Kary Ng (born 1986), Hong Kong singer
- Lawrence Ng (born 1964), Hong Kong actor
- Ng Man-tat (1952–2021), Hong Kong actor
- Margaret Ng (born 1948), Hong Kong politician, barrister, writer and columnist
- Melissa Ng (born 1972), American Hong Kong retired actress
- Ng Ming-yum (1955–1992), Hong Kong politician and writer
- Ng On-yee (born 1990), Hong Kong former professional snooker player
- Ng Tat Wai (born 1947), Malaysian badminton player
- Richard Ng (1939–2023), Hong Kong actor
- Ron Ng (born 1979), Hong Kong actor and singer
- Sandra Ng (born 1965), Hong Kong actress, film director and producer
- Ng See-yuen (born 1944), Hong Kong film producer, director, screenwriter and businessman
- Stephen Ng (born 1953), Hong Kong entrepreneur
- Ng Ting Yip (born 1960), Hong Kong actor
- Stanley Ng (born 1960), Hong Kong urban planner and politician
- Ng Wai Chiu (born 1981), Hong Kong professional football player
- Ng Wei (born 1981), Hong Kong badminton player
- Yan Ng (born 1983), Hong Kong singer and actress
- Ren Ng (born 1979), Malaysian American scientist
- Maya Soetoro-Ng (born 1970), Indonesian-born American academic

=== Chinese character spelling 伍 ===
- Wu Zixu (?–484 BC), general and politician during the Spring and Autumn period, credited by all branches of 伍 clans as the 'first ancestor'
- Wu Ting-fang (1842–1922), also known as Ng Choy, Chinese calligrapher, diplomat, lawyer, politician, and writer
- Jiahui Wu (born 1981), Malaysian singer-songwriter
- Sky Wu (born 1966), Taiwanese singer-songwriter
- Celeste Ng (born 1980), American writer and novelist
- Chelsia Ng (born 1981), Malaysian actress
- Charles Ng (racing driver) (born 1984), Hong Kong professional race car driver
- Christine Ng (born 1969), Hong Kong actress
- Edward Ng (1939–2018), American applied mathematician who worked for NASA
- Katherine Ng (born 1974), Hong Kong politician
- Kingsley Ng, interdisciplinary artist
- Kim Ng (born 1968), American executive in Major League Baseball
- Mary Ng (born 1969), Canadian politician
- Ng Boon Bee (1937–2022), former Malaysian badminton player
- Irene Ng (politician) (born 1963), Malaysian-born Singaporean politician
- Ng Yat Chung (born 1961), Singaporean former lieutenant-general
- Philip Ng (born 1977), Hong Kong-born American actor, martial artist and action choreographer
- Rita Ng (born 1978), American cardiologist and beauty pageant titleholder
- Ng Poon Chew (1866–1931), Chinese author, publisher, and advocate for Chinese American civil rights
- Josiah Ng (born 1980), Malaysian track cyclist
- Win Ng (1936–1991), Chinese-American artist, entrepreneur, and decorative designer

=== Chinese character spelling 黄 ===
- Allan Ng (born 1941), Singaporean businessman
- Darren Ng (born 1983), Australian basketball player
- Elvin Ng (born 1980), Singaporean actor
- Irene Ng (born 1974), American actress, teacher and banker
- Jasmine Ng (born 1972), Singaporean film director
- Lina Ng (born 1974), Singaporean actress
- Nigel Ng (born 1991), Malaysian stand-up comedian
- Ng Eng Teng (1934–2001), Singaporean sculptor
- Ng Chee Khern (born 1965), Singaporean civil servant and former major-general
- Ng Chee Yang, Singaporean singer-songwriter
- Ng Eng Hen (born 1958), Singaporean politician and former oncologist
- Ng Joo Ngan (born 1947), Malaysian cyclist
- Ng Moon Hing (born 1955), Malaysian Anglican Bishop
- Ng Ser Miang (born 1949), Singaporean entrepreneur, diplomat, and retired sailor
- Ng Shin Yii (born 1989), Malaysian wushu athlete
- Ng Swee Hong (1935–2006), Malaysian businessman
- Ng Teng Fong (1928–2010), Singaporean real estate tycoon
- Robert Ng (born 1952), Singaporean businessman
- Ng Tian Hann (born 1969), Malaysian Chinese movie director
- Ng Woon Lam (born 1971), Malaysian painter
- Ng Yen Yen (born 1946), Malaysian politician
- Yew-Kwang Ng (born 1942), Malaysian-Australian economist
- Ng Yi Sheng (born 1980), Singaporean writer
- Ng Yong Li (born 1985), Malaysian professional racing cyclist
- Darren Ng Wei Jie (1991–2010), Singaporean murder victim
- Agnes Ng Siew Heok, Singaporean murder victim of the Toa Payoh child murders
- Ng Soo Hin (1971–1993), Singaporean murderer
- Ng Lee Kheng (1971–1990), Singaporean murder victim
- Ng Tze Yong (born 2000), Malaysian badminton player
- Kym Ng (born 1967), Singaporean television host and actress
- Perry Ng (born 1996), English footballer

== See also ==
- "Ana Ng", an alternative rock song by the band They Might Be Giants
- Huang (disambiguation)
- Wong (disambiguation)
- Wu (surname)
