= Heba Sheng =

Western Wei general (died 544)

- 賀拔勝
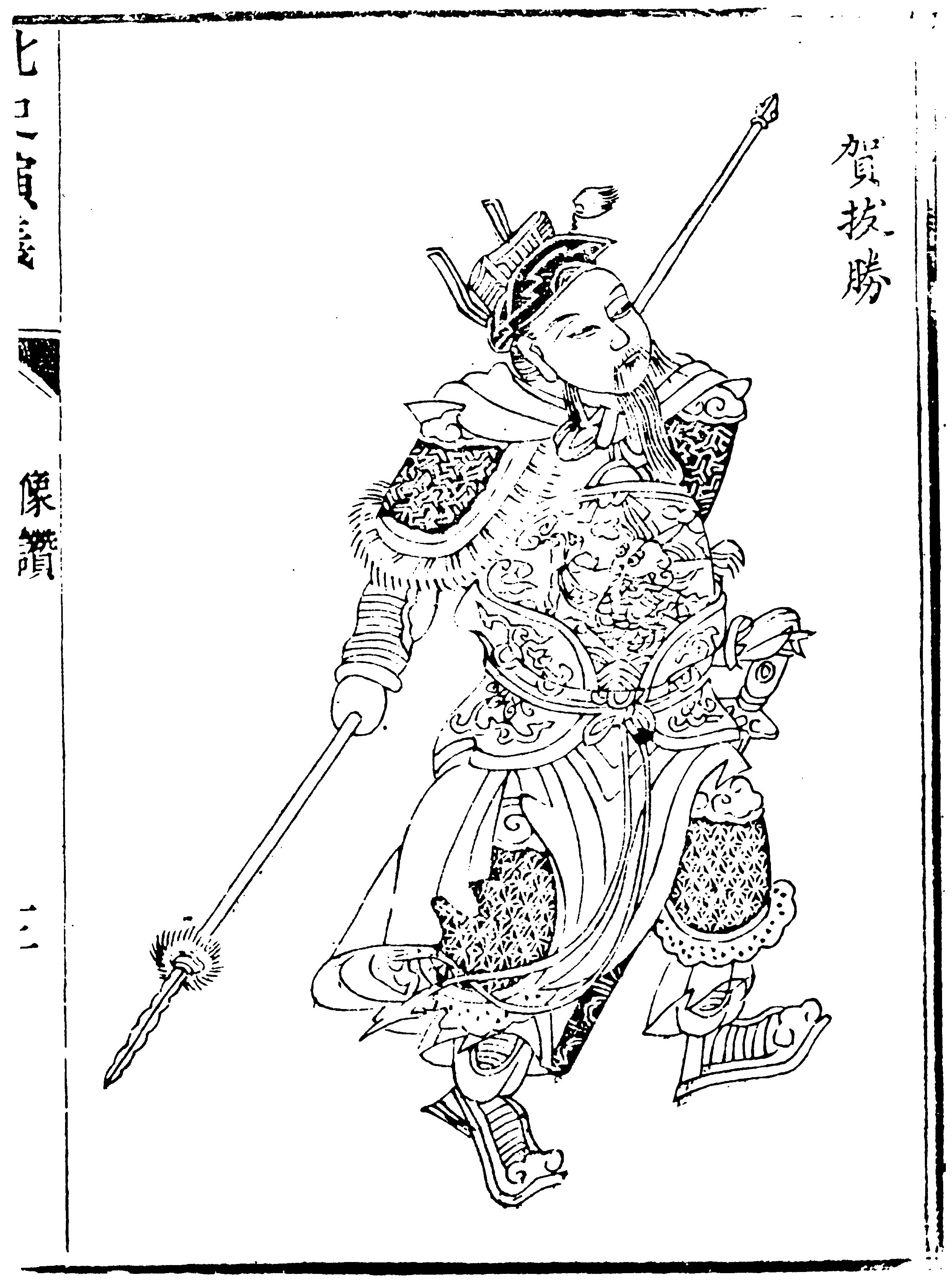

Grand Preceptor (太師)
- In office 536–544
- Monarch: Emperor Wen of Western Wei

Personal details
- Born: Unknown Shouyang County, Shanxi
- Died: 544
- Relations: Heba Yun (brother); Heba Yue (brother)
- Children: Heba Bisha; Heba Zhongyuan (adopted)
- Parent: Heba Duba (father)
- Courtesy name: Pohu (破胡)
- Peerage: Duke of Langya Commandery (瑯琊郡公)
- Posthumous name: Zhenxian (貞獻)

Heba Sheng (died 544), courtesy name Pohu, was a Tiele military general of the Northern Wei and Western Wei during the Northern and Southern dynasties period. Along with his family, he fought against the rebels of the Six Garrisons before joining the commander, Erzhu Rong, distinguishing himself through his military deeds. After the fall of the Erzhu clan, he was given command over Jing province by Emperor Xiaowu to act as a deterrent against the paramount general, Gao Huan, but when his brother, Heba Yue was suddenly assassinated by Gao in 534, he hesitated to support the emperor and was ultimately driven out to the Liang dynasty.

After a three-year stay in the Liang, Heba returned north to join Yuwen Tai and the Western Wei, fighting in several battles against Gao Huan and the Eastern Wei. In 543, at the Battle of Mount Mang, he came close to killing Gao in battle before his horse was shot down by an enemy general. In reprisal, Gao had Heba's sons under him killed, causing Heba to grow ill in anger and die soon after.

== Background ==
Heba Sheng was born into a Tiele family from Jianshan County (尖山縣), Shenwu Commandery (神武郡; in present-day Shenchi County, Shanxi) as the son of Heba Duba (賀拔度拔), the commander of the Wuchuan garrison under the Northern Wei. Together with his elder brother, Heba Yun and his younger brother, Heba Yue, they were renowned for their bravery along the northern border. Heba Sheng was also skilled in archery and horsemanship.

== Rebellion of the Six Garrisons ==
=== Siege of Huaishuo ===
In 523, rebellion broke out in the Six Garrisons led by Poliuhan Baling of Woye garrison (沃野鎮; northeast of present-day Linhe District, Inner Mongolia). Poliuhan sent his general, Wei Kegu (衛可孤) eastward to attack Huaishuo (懷朔鎮, near present-day Guyang County, Inner Mongolia), which was defended by the commander Yang Jun (楊鈞). Hearing of Heba Duba's reputation, Yang Jun summoned him to join forces against Wei Kegu's invasion. His sons, including Heba Sheng, were also appointed military officers.

Wei Kegu placed Huaishuo under siege for over a year. In March or April 524, the imperial court sent the Prince of Linhuai, Yuan Yu (元彧) to lift the siege, but Yuan Yu stopped at Shuo province and refused to advance any further. Seeing the delay in reinforcements, Heba Sheng asked Yang Jun for permission to leave the city and urge Yuan Yu to help. Heba recruited more than ten brave men and broke through the enemy lines at night, shouting "I am Heba Pohu!" along the way. The rebels did not dare attack him, and Heba managed to reach Shuo province. After delivering an earnest plea for help, Yuan Yu agreed to advance and sent Heba back to Huaishou to report the news. Heba returned swiftly and broke through the siege again, shooting and killing several of his pursuers. At the city gates, he declared, "Heba Pohu has come with a great army!" so the defenders opened the gates and let him in.

Afterwards, Heba Sheng was sent by Yang Jun to scout and observe the situation at Wuchuan. When he learned that Wuchuan had fallen, he turned back to Huaishuo only to find out that that the city was lost to rebels as well. Heba Duba and his sons were captured, and while Yuan Yu did kept his words, he was defeated by rebels at Wuyuan. Fortunately for Heba Sheng, his father and brothers rallied their fellow captives and mounted a revolt against Wei Kegu, killing him in an ambush. Heba Duba then sent Heba Sheng to Shuo province to report their success, but as he did, Heba Duba was soon killed in battle while fighting the Tiele.

=== Relieving Yuan Yuan ===
The Inspector of Shuo, Fei Mu appreciated Heba Sheng's talents, so he kept him by entrusting him with military affairs, often employing him as a cavalry officer. Later, the Prince of Guangyang, Yuan Yuan was heavily besieged at Wuyuan garrison by Poliuhan Baling, so the prince decided to call Heba Sheng for reinforcements. Heba led 200 recruits out to the east and killed more than 100 of the rebels, forcing them to retreat for dozens of miles. Yuan Yuan capitalized by withdrawing his army to Shuo province, with Heba Sheng acting as their escort. For his contributions, Heba was given command over an army and promoted to General Who Calms the Waves.

== Service under the Erzhu clan ==
=== Serving Erzhu Rong ===
Heba Sheng was later reunited with his brothers as they were assigned to guard Heng province (恆州; roughly present-day Datong, Shanxi). However, in 526, Xianyu Ahu (鮮于阿胡) started a rebellion in Shuo province and invased Heng, during which the brothers were again separated when the rebels captured their city. Heba Yun and Heba Yue went to join the Wei commander Erzhu Rong, while Heba Sheng fled to Si province (肆州, roughly modern Xinzhou, Shanxi). When Erzhu Rong captured Si from the provincial inspector, Wei Qingbin (尉慶賓) later that year, Heba Sheng joined him, much to Erzhu's delight, who said, "I have you and your brothers when I have yet to even pacify the world." As rebel forces in Hebei under Du Luozhou and Ge Rong grew, Erzhu appointed Heba as General Who Guards Distant Lands, instructing him to lead 5,000 troops to guard Jingxing and resist the westward advance of the rebels.

In 528, after Empress Dowager Hu poisoned Emperor Xiaoming, Erzhu Rong led his troops to Luoyang and carried out the Heyin massacre. After enthroning Emperor Xiaozhuang to the throne, Heba Sheng was enfeoffed the Count of Yiyang County and received a number of offices for his meritorious service. Later that year, he served as Grand Chief Controller of the Vanguard under the Prime Minister, Yuan Tianmu in his campaign against Ge Rong, capturing thousands of prisoners in their victory at Fukou (滏口; northwest of present-day Ci County, Hebei). Later, a remnant of Ge Rong's forces, Han Lou, rebelled in Jicheng. Heba Sheng was appointed Grand Chief Controller and stationed at Zhongshan (中山, in modern Baoding, Hebei), during which Han Lou did not dare advace south due to Heba's reputation.

In 529, Heba Sheng was recalled from Zhongshan and made Grand Chief Controller of the Front Army in Erzhu Rong's campaign against Yuan Hao and the Liang general, Chen Qingzhi at Luoyang. With Erzhu Zhao, Heba Sheng led 1,000 cavalrymen to cross the river from Xiashi (硤石; north of Luoyang, Henan) to attack Yuan Hao. In his retreat, Yuan Hao was killed, while his son Yuan Guanshou (元冠受) and the Liang general, Chen Sibao (陳思保) were all captured. Heba pressed on to Luoyang and recaptured the capital. After the campaign, he was made General of the Military Guards and Grand Master of the Palace with Golden Seal and Purple Ribbon, while his fief was elevated to the Duke of Zhending County. Later, he was made Right General of the Guards and Regular Mounted Attendant.

=== Rebellion of the Erzhu clan ===
In 530, after two years of mounting tension, Erzhu Rong was assassinated by Emperor Xiaozhuang at Luoyang. Upon receiving the news, Heba Sheng immediately rushed to Erzhu Rong's residence. At the time, Luoyang was yet to be placed under martial law. One of Erzhu's accomplice, Tian Yi (田怡) proposed to storm the palace, but Heba, due to their lack of troops and believing that the emperor had laid out a trap, argued that they should leave the city and then plan out their next move. Erzhu Rong's family escaped from Luoyang that night through Erzhu Shilong's guidance. Heba accompanied them to Heqiao (河穚; southwest of present-day Mengzhou, Henan), but there, he had a change of heart and decided to return to Luoyang and support Emperor Xiaozhuang.

Not long after, Erzhu Zhao and Erzhu Zhongyuan brought their armies to attack Luoyang in revenge for Erzhu Rong and propped up the Prince of Changguang, Yuan Ye in challenge of Emperor Xiaozhuang. Xiaozhuang appointed Heba Sheng and General of the Cavalry and Chief Controller of the Eastern Expedition, instructing him to join forces wth Zheng Xianhu (鄭先護) in resisting the Erzhu clan. However, Heba was not trusted by Zheng, who placed him outside of the main without the rest of his men and horses. Heba fought against Erzhu Zhongyuan, but without success, so he defected back to the Erzhu, who defeated and executed Emperor Xiaozhuang the following year.

=== Battle of Guang'a and Hanling ===
The Erzhu clan briefly held paramountcy over the empire, but in 531, their general, Gao Huan, raised an army in Xindu in rebellion of their rule. Erzhu Zhao, Erzhu Dulü and Erzhu Zhongyuan brought their forces to fight against Gao Huan, but they were internally at odds with one another, which Gao Huan used to his advantage. Heba was serving in Erzhu Dulü's staff, and fearing that the family's infighting will lead to defeat, he and Husi Chun visited Erzhu Zhao to mediate. However, Zhao had the two men imprisoned, prompting Dulü to withdraw his forces. He then wanted to execute Heba for the crimes of "killing Wei Kegu" and his previous betrayal of the Erzhu clan. Heba argued that the charges were absurd, stating that Wei Kegu was a rebel, and that Erzhu Rong's death was a result of the emperor's own will. Unable to retort, Zhao released Heba, who then rushed back to Luoyang to rejoin Dulü. Erzhu Zhao was subsequently defeated by Gao Huan at Guang'a (廣阿, in modern Xingtai, Hebei).

In 532, Gao Huan captured Xiang province (相州, roughly modern Handan, Hebei) and threatened the Erzhu clan into reuniting against his power. The Erzhu clan converged at Hanling (韩陵; northeast of present-day Anyang, Henan) and faced Gao Huan in a decisive battle. While Erzhu Zhao advanced to attack, Erzhu Dulü was reluctant to do so, instead ordering his soldiers to wait and see. Realizing that the Erzhu clan can never reconcile with each other, Heba Sheng decided to bring his forces over to Gao Huan in surrender. In the end, Gao Huan destroyed the Erzhu clan at Hanling, scattering their forces for them to be eliminated one by one. Gao Huan asserted his authority as paramount general of the empire with Emperor Xiaowu of Wei on the throne, and Heba Sheng was appointed General Who Leads the Army and later a Palace Attendant.

== Division of Northern Wei ==
=== Control over Jing province and invasion of Liang ===
Behind the scenes, Emperor Xiaowu was at odds with Gao Huan, as he was apprehensive of the power he held over the imperial government. At the time, Heba Yue controlled the Guanzhong region in the west, so Xiaowu formed a secret alliance with him to overthrow Gao Huan. In 533, to add more leverage, the emperor appointed Heba Sheng as the Chief Controller of military affairs in the Three Provinces of Jing, General of the Cavalry, Inspector of Jing province and Grand Branch Censorate of the Left Supervisor of the Masters of Writing of the Southern Circuits.

Upon his instatement, Heba Sheng immediately invaded the Liang dynasty in the south to expand his sphere of influence. He captured Xialuo garrison (下溠戍; northwest of present-day Suizhou, Hubei) and enticed the local barbarian ruler, Wen Daoqi (文道期) into surrendering. He then repeatedly defeated the Liang Inspector of Yong province, Xiao Xu (蕭續) and extended his reach south of the Han river. Afterwards, he marched to Fandeng region (樊鄧; between Xiangyang, Hubei and Dengzhou, Henan) where he captured several counties in the vicinity of Xiangyang. The Liang suffered heavy losses, with records stating that land north of the Mianyang was almost destroyed to ruins while Xiao Xu was entrapped in Xiangyang. For his achievements, Heba was appointed Secretariat Director and elevated to Duke of Langya.

=== Hesitation in supporting Emperor Xiaowu ===
However, while Heba Sheng was away on his campaign, Heba Yue was suddenly assassinated by Houmochen Yue in the Guanzhong through Gao Huan's instigation. Heba Yue's forces were left without a leader, with both Gao Huan and Emperor Xiaowu desperate to absorb them. One of Heba Yue's generals, Li Hu went south to inform Heba Sheng of the news and urged him to assume leadership. However, Heba Sheng was unwilling to leave Jing province, and only sent Dugu Xin to appease the troops in Guanzhong. By then, Heba Yue's subordinates had elected Yuwen Tai to succeed him, and they soon avenge Heba Yue by defeating Houmochen. Emperor Xiaowu recognized Yuwen Tai's leadership over the Guanzhong, thus legitimizing him as Heba Yue's successor.

Soon, war broke out between Emperor Xiaowu and Gao Huan, and the former summoned Heba Sheng to reinforce Luoyang. Heba marched out north, but when he arrived at Guang province (廣州; around Lushan County, Henan), he stopped at the Ru River (汝水) and refused to advance. His advisor, Lu Rou (盧柔), proposed to him three options; the best option was to swiftly march to the capital and fight to the death on behalf of the emperor. The middle option was to return to Jing province and reinforce the region, expanding his territory southwards and forming an alliance with Yuwen Tai while they observe the situation. The worst option was to surrender to the Liang, as while he will likely save his life, his reputation will be ruined as a result. Heba only smiled and did nothing in response.

Eventually, Gao Huan broke through the outer defenses of Luoyang. Emperor Xiaowu held a council with his ministers on where he should flee, and while some ministers proposed that he join Heba Sheng in Jing province, he ultimately decided to join Yuwen Tai at Chang'an in the Guanzhong. When he learnt that the emperor had left, Heba Sheng returned to Jing province. He then ordered Yang Xiuzhi (陽休之) to submit a memorial to Chang'an and left Yuan Ying (元颖) to guard Jing while he led his troops to support the emperor in Guanzhong.

=== Surrendering to the Liang ===
When Emperor Xiaowu heard that Heba Sheng had entered the Guanzhong, he appointed him Grand Protector and Manager of the Affairs of the Masters of Writing. However, when Heba Sheng arrived at Xiyang (淅陽; in present-day Xichuan County, Henan), he discovered that Gao Huan's forces had already passed Tongguam and was frightened into returning back to Jing. Despite the minister, Cui Qian (崔謙) urging him to support Xiaowu and Yuwen, Heba refused to listen. Finally, Gao Huan sent his general, Hou Jing to attack him, and Heba was defeated as soon as he arrived at his city.

After his defeat, Heba Sheng fled with several hundred cavalrymen to the Liang capital, Jiankang, where he surrendered. He stayed in the Liang for three years and received special treatment from Emperor Wu of Liang. He requested several times to lead troops to attack Gao Huan, which Emperor Wu repeatedly turned down, but out of respect for his integrity, the emperor promised to return Heba Sheng to the north when the time was right. While Heba Sheng was in the south, Yuwen Tai founded the Western Wei in 534, thus challenging Gao Huan and his Eastern Wei in the north.

== Service under Western Wei ==
=== Returning north ===
In 536, Heba Sheng and his subordinates made a request to Emperor Wu's favourite advisor, Zhu Yi, to send them to the Guanzhong. In the meantime, the Western Wei also sent an envoy, Zhao Gang (趙剛) to discuss the return of Heba Sheng and the others. Once the negotiations succeeded, Heba Sheng and his followers were released. Along the way, Heba's party was chased after by Hou Jing, forcing them to abandon their boat and take the mountain roads instead. Half of his followers succumbed to hunger and cold, but they eventually arrived at Chang'an. Rewarding them for his return, Heba was given the office of the Grand Tutor.

When he first returned to the Guanzhong, Heba, who was more older and experienced than Yuwen Tai, refused to kowtow to him, but he soon grew to regret this decision. Yuwen Tai later held a banquet at Kunming Lake (昆明池), where he saw two ducks swimming in the lake. He handed Heba a bow and arrow, requesting him to display his talents in marksmanship. After shooting the ducks with a single shot, Heba took the opportunity to kowtow to Yuwen and said, "I wish to uphold the worthy and strike down the rebels, just like that." Yuwen was pleased by his actions.

=== Battles with Eastern Wei ===
In 537, Heba Sheng followed Yuwen Tai and participated in the Battle of Xiaoguan, where the Western Wei forces killed the Eastern Wei general, Dou Tai. He was then promoted to Chief Controller of the Central Army. Later, he accompanied Yuwen Tai to conquer Hongnong, during which he led his troops across the river from Shanjin (陕津; in present-day Sanmenxia, Henan) to pursue and capture the general, Gao Gan (高干). Capitalizing on his victory, he entered the Hebei and further captured alive the administrators, Sun Yan (孫晏) and Cui Yi (崔乂).

In October or November that same year, Gao Huan's forces were defeated by Yuwen Tai at the Battle of Shayuan. Heba Sheng followed Yuwen to pursue the retreating army all the way to the Yellow River. Dividing his troops and advancing eastward, Yuwen sent Heba and Li Bi to cross the river and attack Puban (蒲阪, in modern Yuncheng, Shanxi). The city defenders opened the gates to surrender, while the commander, Xue Chongli (薛崇禮) abandoned them and fled but was eventually captured by Heba. The Hedong thus fell to the Western Wei, and Heba was awarded with 5,000 households for his fief.

In 538, the Western Wei faced the Eastern Wei again at the Battle of Heqiao, but this time suffered a defeat. Heba Sheng was tasked in recruiting back surrendered soldiers. In 542, Gao Huan laid siege to Yubi (玉壁, in modern Yuncheng, Shanxi) but retreated as he was unable to break through the city. Heba was appointed Chief Controller of the Front Army and followed Yuwen Tai to pursue Gao Huan all the way to Fenbei (汾北; north of Xiangning County, Shanxi).

=== Battle of Mount Mang and death ===
In 543, Yuwen Tai and Gao Huan fought once more at the Battle of Mount Mang. During the battle, Yuwen spotted Gao Huan's flag and recognized him. He then recruited 3,000 elite soldiers with short weapons and placed them under Heba Sheng's command to attack Gao Huan. In the chaos, Heba happened to come face to face with Gao Huan and declared "Heliuhun! (Note: Heliuhun (賀六渾) was Gao Huan's Xianbei name.) I, Heba Pohu, will slay you!" Brandishing a long spear, Heba chased after Gao Huan for several miles on horseback and almost stabbed him. However, Gao Huan's general, Duan Shao managed to shoot his horse dead and allowed him to escape. By the time Heba's deputies arrived, Gao Huan was long gone. Heba sighed and said, "Today was because I did not bring a bow and arrow. This is Heaven's will!"

After the incident, Gao Huan returned to Ye and ordered for Heba Sheng's sons who remained in the Eastern Wei to all be executed. When Heba learnt of their deaths, he became so resentful that he fell ill, eventually dying in 544. The Western Wei court posthumously awarded him the office of Inspector of Ding province, Grand Chancellor and Recorder of the Secretariat, as well as the posthumous name of "Zhenxian". Under the Northern Zhou dynasty in 558, he was enshrined in the ancestral temple of Yuwen Tai.

== Sources ==
- Book of Zhou
- History of the Northern Dynasties
- Zizhi Tongjian
