= Wang =

Wang may refer to:

== Names ==
- Wang (surname) (王), a common Chinese surname
- Wāng (汪), a less common Chinese surname
- Titles in Chinese nobility
- A title in Korean nobility
- A title in Mongolian nobility

== Places ==
- Wang River in Thailand
- Wang Township, Minnesota, a township in the United States
- Wang, Bavaria, a town in the district of Freising, Bavaria, Germany
- Wang, Austria, a town in the district of Scheibbs in Lower Austria
- An abbreviation for the town of Wangaratta, Australia
- Wang Theatre, in Boston, Massachusetts
- Charles B. Wang Center, an Asian American center at Stony Brook University

== Broadcasting ==
- WWNG, a radio station (1330 AM) licensed to serve Havelock, North Carolina, United States, which held the call sign WANG from 1999 to 2017
- WBKZ, a radio station licensed to Havelock, North Carolina formerly known as WANG-FM
- WANG, a radio station using the call sign since 2018

== Other ==
- Wang (Tibetan Buddhism), a form of empowerment or initiation
- Wang tile, in mathematics, are a class of formal systems
- Wang (musical), an 1891 New York musical
- Wang Film Productions, Taiwanese-American animation studios
- Wang Laboratories, an American computer company founded by Dr. An Wang
- Wang International Standard Code for Information Interchange, a proprietary version of ASCII

== See also ==
- Huang (disambiguation)
- Wong (disambiguation)
- Wang Chung (disambiguation)
- Vong (disambiguation)
- Whang (disambiguation)
- Waang (disambiguation)
