= Yang Kan =

Liang dynasty general (496–549)

- 羊侃
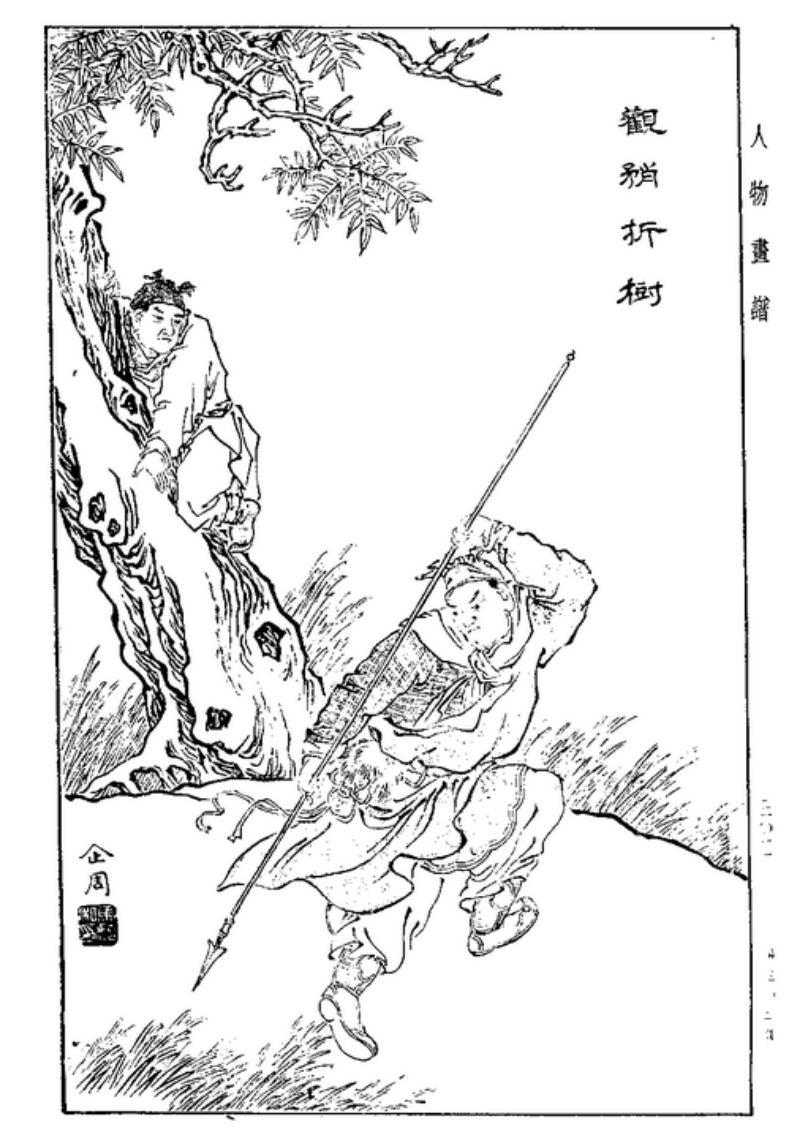

Director of the Justice Department of the Imperial Secretariat (都官尚書)
- In office 548–549
- Monarch: Emperor Wu of Liang

Personal details
- Born: 496 Xintai, Shandong
- Died: 549 Nanjing, Jiangsu
- Children: Yang Zhuo; Yang Qiu; Yang Kun; Unnamed daughter
- Parent: Yang Zhi (father)
- Courtesy name: Zuxin (祖忻)
- Peerage: Marquis of Gaochang County (高昌縣侯)

Yang Kan (495 – January or February 549), courtesy name Zuxin, was a military general of the Northern Wei and Liang during the Northern and Southern dynasties period. During the final years of the Northern Wei, he began a rebellion and led his followers to join the Liang, fulfilling his family's wish of returning to the southlands. Yang Kan then became a general of Liang, participating in a few northern expeditions but never given important roles. In 548, when Jiankang came under heavy siege from the rebel, Hou Jing, he staunchly defended the capital before dying of illness.

Outside of his official duty, Yang Kan garnered a reputation in the south for his sumptuous lifestyle, love for music and martial prowess. He possessed remarkable physical strength, with one story stating that he chopped down a tree using only a spear.

== Background ==
Yang Kan's family originally hailed from Liangfu County (梁父縣; in present-day Xintai, Shandong), Taishan Commandery. He was a descendant of Yang Xu, the Administrator of Nanyang during the Eastern Han dynasty. (Note: Yang Xu was the paternal grandfather of Yang Hu and Yang Huiyu.) His grandfather, Yang Gui (羊規) was the Magistrate of Rencheng County under the Liu Song dynasty, but he later surrendered to the Northern Wei, becoming the Administrator of Yanmen and receiving the title of Viscount of Juping. Yang Kan was the sixth son of Yang Zhi (羊祉), the Inspector of Yan province and General Who Guards the Army.

From a young age, Yang Kan had a very imposing figure, as he reportedly stood around "seven chi and eight cun" (approx. 1.9m or 6'2) and was capable of wielding a bow that weighed 10 shi. He was also fond of reading literature and history, particularly the Art of War and the Zuo Zhuan. Before the age of 20, he followed his father to Liang province, and through his military deeds, he was appointed as a Gentleman of the Masters of Writing.

In 527, the Qiang rebel in Qin province, Mozhe Niansheng rebelled and proclaimed himself as emperor. He sent his brother, Mozhe Tiansheng (莫折天生) to capture Qi province and then invade Yong province. Yang Kan, now a lieutenant, followed the general, Xiao Baoyin to fight the rebels. During the campaign, he shot Mozhe Tiansheng dead with a single arrow, causing his troops to scatter. His efforts earned him the positions of General Who Attacks the East, Administrator of Taishan and Branch Censorate of the Eastern Circuits, as well as the fiefly title of Marquis of Juping.

== Rebellion against Northern Wei ==
Though his family had served the Wei for three generations, Yang Zhi longed to return his family's services to the southern dynasties and often reminded his sons to go south when they have the chance.

In 528, while Yang Kan was serving in Taishan, the official, Xu He (徐紇) (Note: There are two pronunciations to the character "紇":"hé" and "gē". Xu was a favourite of Empress Dowager Hu, who was killed by Erzhu Rong.) fled to him after the Wei commander, Erzhu Rong brought his army to purge the imperial court in Luoyang. (Note: The purge was known as the "Heyin Incident" (河阴之变).) Xu He encouraged Yang Kan to rebel, and remembering his father's wishes, he gathered his followers to leave for the Liang dynasty in the south. However, his cousin, the Inspector of Yan province, Yang Dun (羊敦), remained loyal to Wei and mounted a defense in his city. Yang Kan led 30,000 soldiers to besiege Yang Dun, but was unsuccessful, so he built more than a dozen forts at Xiaqiu (瑕丘; in present-day Yanzhou, Shandong) and requested reinforcements from the Liang. Emperor Wu of Liang received his envoy and sent Yang Yaren (羊鴉仁) and Wang Bian (王弁) to retrieve him while Li Yuanlu (李元履) transported their weapons and provisions.

Yang Kan's rebellion coincided with the uprising of Xing Gao, who rebelled in the neighbouring province of Qing. The Wei court initially attempted to appease the two rebel leaders by offering them offices and titles, but they refused. Thus, the court decided to suppress them through force by sending the general, Yu Hui with an army of 100,000 with Gao Huan and Erzhu Yangdu (爾朱陽都) acting as reinforcements. The Wei army first besieged Yang and cut them off from the Liang army. Yang's forces fought to the point that their camps were completely depleted of arrows. In November or December, Yang brought his troops south, fighting the enemy as they advanced. By the time they reached Zhakou (渣口; west of present-day Shuyang County, Jiangsu), they still had over 10,000 soldiers and 2,000 horses. However, as they were about to cross the river and enter Liang territory, many of the soldiers became homesick and spent the entire night singing mournful songs. Understanding their grief, Yang allowed those who wanted to return home to turn back to the north. The soldiers bid him farewell before they dispersed.

== Early service under Liang ==
In 529, Yang Kan arrived at the Liang capital of Jiankang, where Emperor Wu granted him tally and appointed him Regular Mounted Attendant, Chief Controller of the military expedition to Xiaqiu, General Who Stabilizes the North and Inspector of Xu province while his brothers were also given roles as provincial inspectors. He was soon appointed Chief Controller of the Northern Expeditions and stationed at Dunri city (頓日城) to support the general, Chen Qingzhi in his northern expeditions. Later, he was made General of Cloud Banner and Inspector of the two provinces of Qing and Ji.

In 532, Emperor Wu intended to send Yuan Faseng, a member of the ruling clan of Northern Wei who defected to Liang, north to establish a puppet regime as the King of Eastern Wei. As the two were old friends, Yuan requested to the court that Yang Kan follow him back to the north, which was granted. Before they departed, Emperor Wu summoned Yang to discuss the strategy for the campaign. Yang presented his plans, but then said, "Since returning to the court, my heart has always been to serve the people, but I cannot travel with Yuan Faseng. Though the northerners think that I am from Wu, the southerners still see me as a northern barbarian. For me to follow Faseng is like sending northerners to fight northerners. Not only does this go against my family's long-cherished wishes, but I fear the northern tribes will look down upon the Han Chinese." However, Emperor Wu insisted that he go north and appointed him a Marshal.

In July or August, Yang Kan arrived at Guanzhu (官竹; northeast of present-day Bozhou, Anhui) and received news that the main commander of the northern expedition, Yuan Shu, was defeated and captured. He then led his troops in retreat and soon resigned from the military, becoming a Palace Attendant in the court. In 533, his peerage was elevated to the Marquis of Gaochang County.

In 534, Yang Kan was appointed General of Cloud Banner and Administrator of Jin'an. At the time, the Minyue region was plagued by rebellions, and many of the local governors were unable to quell them. When Yang arrived, he suppressed the rebels and killed their leaders, Chen Cheng (陳稱), Wu Man (吳滿) and others. For the rest of his tenure, the region remained at peace and no one dared to rebel. Soon, he was appointed the Left Defense Commander for the Crown Prince.

For the next decade, Yang Kan held a series of different offices; in 540, he was appointed as Right Chief Clerk to the Minister Over the Masses. In 542, he was made Director of the Justice Department of the Imperial Secretariat. Then, in 543, he was granted tally and assigned to General of Strong Authority and Inspector of Heng province.

== The Hou Jing Disturbance ==
=== Battle of Hanshan ===
In 547, Yang Kan was summoned back to the capital to serve as a Palace Attendant. At the time, the Eastern Wei general, Hou Jing rebelled in Henan and called upon the Liang to support him. Emperor Wu issued another northern expedition, and Yang was made Champion General and tasked with building a weir at Hanshan (寒山; in present-day Xuzhou, Jiangsu). After completing the weir, he advised his commander, Xiao Yuanming to flood the enemy city of Pengcheng, but was ignored. When Eastern Wei reinforcements led by Murong Shaozong arrived, Yang Kan repeatedly urged Xiao to attack him, but was rejected each time. In the end, Yang brought his soldiers to camp at the newly built weir. In November or December, the main Liang force was defeated, so Yang ordered his men into battle formation and slowly withdrew.

=== Siege of Jiankang ===
When Yang Kan returned in 548, he was once again appointed Director of the Justice Department of the Imperial Secretariat. Meanwhile, Hou Jing was defeated in Henan and formally surrendered to the Liang. However, he soon rebelled and captured Liyang. When asked by Emperor Wu for countermeasures, Yang said, "Hou Jing had long been planning to rebel and is making haste towards the capital. We should swiftly occupy Caishi and order the Prince of Shaoling (Xiao Lun (蕭綸)) to attack Shouchun. Hou Jing will be unable to advance, and if he retreats, he will be without a nest, and his forces will soon dissipate." The officials in Jiankang did not believe that Hou Jing would attack their city. Instead, they ordered Yang to lead more than 1,000 cavalrymen to camp at Wangguo Gate (望國門).

As Yang Kan predicted, Hou Jing continued south towards Jiankang and reached Xinlin (新林; southwest of present-day Nanjing, Jiangsu). When Hou Jing rebelled, the lands of Liang had been at peace for nearly five decades that even many of the officials and scholars in the countrysides do not have experience in war. By then, many of the old generals in the capital were dead, while the new generals were all stationed outside. The only generals in Jiankang aside from Yang Kan were Liu Jin (柳津), who was old and sickly, and Wei An (韋黯), who was considered cowardly and incompetent. Therefore, the imperial court sent people to fetch Yang Kan and ask him to assist the Crown Prince, Xiao Daqi to command the capital's army.

With Hou Jing's arrival coming as a surprise, there was great disorder in the capital as many people rushed in to take refuge. Yang Kan divided the city into areas of defence and had the royal family participate in the fight. He also issued for any soldiers caught stealing weapons from the armoury to be executed, thus restoring order in the city. When Hou Jing approached the capital, the people were frightened, but Yang falsely claimed that he had received an arrow with a letter stating that reinforcements were coming, which slightly calmed them down. The rebels set fire to the Eastern Ye Gate (東掖門), but Yang put it out with water and killed several of the rebels with his bow, driving them back. Emperor Wu promoted Yang Kan to a Palace Attendant and Military Adviser-General. He also wanted to gift him a large sum of gold, silver and silk for him to reward his soldiers, but Yang refused, using his own wealth to award them instead.

The rebels then built a "pointed wooden donkey" to attack the city, which the defenders were unable to counter it. Yang Kan made a pheasant tail torch, installing an iron arrowhead doused in oil and fired it at the wooden donkey, burning it completely. The rebels also built earthen mounds on the east and west sides of the city, but Yang sent people to dig tunnels below the mounds, causing them to collapse. Other than that, the rebels made a tower cart that was around ten zhang tall, intending to shoot arrows into the city from it. However, Yang observed that the tower was too high and that the city moat was still shallow, so they will not need to deal with it. As he anticipated, when the cart started moving, it immediately fell.

Unable to break through, Hou Jing decided to make long siege lines to surround Jiankang. Emperor Wu's advisors, Zhu Yi and Zhang Wen (張綰), suggested they sally out and attack the lines. Yang Kan disagreed, stating that sending out too few soldiers will not yield success, but sending out too many soldiers and failing, due to the narrow gates and small bridges, will result in a crush when they withdraw back into the city, hence causing heavier casualties. However, Emperor Wu did not listen to Yang, and sent over a thousand soldiers to fight. Before they could even engage, the Liang soldiers retreated, and indeed, as they were scrambling across the bridge, many of them fell into the water, with most of them dying.

During the siege, Yang Kan's eldest son, Yang Zhuo (羊鷟) was captured by the rebels. Hou Jing brought Yang Zhuo to the city to coerce his father into surrendering. When Yang Kan saw him, he said, "I have sacrificed my whole clan just to serve the lord, and it still does not suffice. Why would I care about a single son?" Hou Jing returned with Yang Zhuo a few days later, but Yang Kan remained persistent, saying to his son, "I thought you dead for a long time, so how are you still alive? I have pledged my life to my state and swore to die in battle. I will not falter because of you." He then shot Yang Zhuo with a bow. Hou Jing was moved by his show of loyalty, so he did not kill Yang Zhuo.

Hou Jing later sent the official, Fu Shizhe (傅士哲) to speak with Yang Kan, telling him, "King Hou had come from afar to pay his respects to the emperor, so why are you closed off and denying him his tribute? As a minister of state, you should be opening the court." Yang angrily refuted, "Since General Hou's surrender, the court had place great trust and expectations onto him. What grievance could have caused him to suddenly rise up in arms? Is this the behaviour of a minister? I will not fall for your honeyed words and open the door to thieves." Before leaving, Fu Shizhe, who admired Yang, requested to see him without his military armour. Yang removed his helmet, and Fu Shizhe left after staring at his face for some time.

Later, heavy rain caused the earth hills within the city to collapse. The rebels took the opportunity to attack the city, and the defenders were unable to stop them. Yang Kan ordered his soldiers to throw their torches and burn the city to slow the rebels down. He then slowly built a new wall within the city to prevent the enemy advance.

=== Death and posthumous honours ===
In January or February 549, Yang Kan fell ill and soon died in the city palace at the age of 54 (by East Asian reckoning). Emperor Wu posthumously appointed him a Palace Attendant, General Who Protects the Army. He was also awarded with "Secret Objects of the Eastern Garden" (東園祕器) and a troupe of musicians. While reinforcements under the Prince of Shaoling, Xiao Lun and Liu Zhongli soon arrived, they were defeated by Hou Jing, and Jiankang and Emperor Wu were both captured by the rebels later that year.

After the fall of Jiankang, Hou Jing made Yang Kan's daughter his concubine. One of his sons, Yang Kun (羊鵾), surrendered to Hou Jing, but in 552, he assassinated Hou on his ship and returned to Liang, thus ending the rebellion.

== Anecdotes ==
=== Physical feats ===
Due to his remarkable physique, there are a few anecdotes that features Yang Kan boasting his immense strength. He reportedly scaled the walls of the Yao Temple (堯廟) in Yan province up to a height of four zhang and moving seven bu to the left and right. On the Si Bridge (泗橋), there were several stone statues, each eight chi long and ten girth wide. Yang Kan grabbed and struck them against each other, shattering them to pieces.

The Emperor of Northern Wei once said to Yang Kan, "My attendants all call you a tiger. Or perhaps you are just a sheep in tiger skin? Show me that you are a tiger." Yang then laid down and dug his hands into the palace floor, reaching more than a finger deep.

=== The Tree Breaking Spear ===
Emperor Wu of Liang once held a banquet at Leyou Garden (樂游苑). At the time, the Minister Steward had just forged a double-edged spear that was 24 chi long and 13 cun thick. The emperor asked Yang Kan to try the new spear while using his crimson horse. Yang mounted the horse and utilized the spear with great skill that a spectator even climbed up a tree to watch. Emperor Wu said, "That tree will surely be broken by Palace Attendant Yang." Later, Yang Kan struck the tree and broke it, so the spear was given the name "Tree Breaking Spear" (折樹槊).

=== Music and extravagant lifestyle ===
On the other hand, Yang Kan was also well versed in music and lived very lavishly. He composed two songs, titled "Picking Lotus" (採蓮) and "Song of the Oar" (棹歌), and often had his concubines by his side. When Yang Kan was serving in Heng province, he had two ships linked together and built three waterside pavilions on them, decorated with pearls, jade and brocade, furnished with curtains and screens, and with female musicians on display. When the tide was right, he untied the ship ropes and held a banquet facing the waves. The river was often crowded with onlookers from both sides who came to see his vessel.

During the Datong era (535–546), Yang Wei (陽斐) of the Eastern Wei dynasty was sent to Liang as an envoy. Due to him being an old classmate of Yang Kan, Emperor Wu ordered Yang Kan to invite Yang Wei over for a banquet. There were 300 guests, and the tablewares were all gold and jade inlaid with gemstones. There were three female musicians performing, and at night, there were 100 maids serving the guests, each carrying candles with gold flowers to provide lighting.

At another banquet at Liankou (漣口; in present-day Lianshui County, Jiangsu), Yang Kan had a guest named Zhang Rucai (張孺才) who after getting drunk, set fire on a boat which spread to more than 70 ships and destroyed countless gold and silk. When Yang heard of the incident, he was unfazed and continued serving wine. In shame, Zhang Rucai fled, but Yang sent someone to console him and treated him the same as before.

== Sources ==
- Book of Liang
- History of the Southern Dynasties
- Zizhi Tongjian
