= Fu (surname 符) =

Chinese family name

Fú or Foo (符) is a Chinese surname meaning “tally” in ancient Chinese, referring to the Zhou dynasty Fu (tally). Its use as a surname derives from the post name Fu Xi Ling (符璽令), which was borne by Gong Ya, grandson of Duke Qing of Lu who later migrated to Qin. According to the Oxford Dictionary of Family Names on Britain and Ireland: “This was a post held by the man in charge of the tally given by a ruler to a general to deploy troops or to an envoy as his credentials.”

It is the 142nd-most common name, shared by 0.082% of the population or 1,090,000 people, with the province with the most being Hainan.

== Notable people ==
- Li Cunshen (né 符存 Fú Cún; 862 – June 16, 924); whose surname Li was given by emperor
- Fu Yanqing (符彥卿; 898 – 975), Chinese military general, monarch, and politician
- Fu Dingyi (符定一; 1877 – 1951), Chinese educator and scholar
- Elder Empress Fu (符皇后): empress of Later Zhou dynasty
- Empress Dowager Fu (Later Zhou) (符皇后): empress of Later Zhou dynasty.
- Fu Hao (符浩; born Fu Zhongxiao 符忠孝; 1916 – 2016), Chinese diplomat
- Fu Tinggui (符廷贵; born 1944), Chinese general
- Yu-Foo Yee Shoon (符喜泉; born 1950), Singaporean former politician
- Kok An (né Phu Kok An, 符國安, born 1954), Cambodian businessman
- Cedric Foo Chee Keng (符致镜; born 1960), Singaporean politician
- Fu Linguo (符林国; born 1964), Chinese former general
- Hoo Cher Mou (符策谋; born 1966), Singaporean former general
- Fu Bin (符宾; born 1969), Chinese football player
- Douglas Foo Peow Yong (符标雄; born 1969), Singaporean businessman
- Foo Chin Chin (符真真 Fǔ Zhēnzhēn; 1971 – 1990), Singaporean murder victim, of the 1990 Ng Soo Hin murders
- Corrinne May (né Corrinne Foo May Ying 符美云; born 1973), Singaporean musician
- Harbeth Fu Wing (符泳; born 1980), Hong Kong swimmer
- Meeia Foo (符琼音; born 1983), Malaysian singer
- Fu Yaning (符雅凝; born 1997), Chinese singer and actress
