= Vladivostok 2000 =

Ship built in 1980

History
- Name: Vladivostok 2000
- Owner: Pacific Marine Trawlers Ltd.
- Operator: Dalmoreprodukt
- Port of registry: (Russia) Nakhodka
- Builder: Nippon Kokan K.K., Tsurumi-ku, Yokohama
- Yard number: 977
- Launched: 14 March 1980
- Completed: 30 June 1980
- Identification: Call sign: UBES7; MMSI number: 273455520; IMO number: 7913622
- Status: Active

General characteristics
- Type: Fish factory ship
- Tonnage: 49,367 tons
- Length: 228.6 m (750 ft 0 in)
- Beam: 32.2 m (105 ft 8 in)
- Draft: 13 m (42 ft 8 in)
- Depth: 19 m (62 ft 4 in)
- Installed power: 10,920 kW (14,640 hp)
- Propulsion: Diesel-Sulzer (Sumitomo) 6RND 76M
- Speed: 15 knots (28 km/h; 17 mph)

Vladivostok 2000 (ex-Damanzaihao) is the world's largest fish factory ship with a mass of 49,367 tons and 228 metres (748 ft 0 in) in length.

Since July 2019, the vessel is Russia-flagged, owned by Pacific Marine Trawlers Ltd and operated by Dalmoreprodukt, both located at Vladivostok.

Previously the ship was sailing under flag of Belize and was owned by Peru-based Pacific Andes and 'Sustainable Fishing Resources', a subsidiary of the conglomerate China Fishery Group, which filed for bankruptcy in the United States on 30 June 2016.

The ship was built in 1980 as an oil tanker for a Norwegian company, and was christened Freeport Chief, since then, it has been renamed Dorsetshire (1990), Protank Orinoco (1991), Vemacape (2009), Lafayette (2014) and lastly, Damanzaihao. In 2008 the vessel was converted to a fish factory ship in a Chinese shipyard.

== Illegal fishing ==
In 2014, the South Pacific Regional Fisheries Management Organisation (SPRFMO) put Damanzaihao on a draft list of illegal, unreported and unregulated fishing (IUU) vessels. Following a review, its listing was confirmed in 2015 and fined $800,000 which remains unpaid as of 2018.

The ship was detained by agents from the Peruvian Environmental Prosecutor's Office on 30 May 2018 following additional allegations of illegal fishing and pollution of Chimbote Bay in Peru. Sea Shepherd Conservation Society's MV John Paul DeJoria vessel operated in Peruvian waters to investigate and gather information to assist the government.

== See also ==
- Environmental crime
- Fishing industry in China
- Flag of convenience
- Illegal, unreported and unregulated fishing (IUU)
