= Waang (disambiguation) =

Waang is an Australian species of sandalwood tree.

Waang may also refer to:

- Crow (Australian Aboriginal mythology)
- A Malaysian electoral district

== See also ==
- WA ANG, the Washington Air National Guard in the United States
- Wang (disambiguation)
- Whang (disambiguation)
