= Swee =

Swee is a component of Chinese given names and may refer to:

- Chen Chong Swee, Singaporean watercolourist
- Foo Swee Chin (born 1977), Singaporean comic book artist
- Goh Keng Swee (1918–2010), second Deputy Prime Minister of Singapore between 1973 and 1984
- Goh Swee Swee (born 1986), Singaporean football striker
- Khoo Swee Chiow (born 1964), Singaporean adventurer, author and motivational speaker
- Lim Swee Aun, politician from the Malaysian Chinese Association, and a Cabinet member
- Lim Swee Say (born 1954), politician from Singapore
- Ng Swee Hong (1935–2006), Malaysian Chinese businessman who founded Pacific Andes

== See also ==
- Bukit Ho Swee, place in Singapore near Taman Ho Swee
- Chin Swee Caves Temple, Taoist temple in Genting Highlands, Pahang, Malaysia
- Chin Swee Tunnel, one of the two tunnels of the Central Expressway
- Swee'Pea, character in E.C. Segar's comic strip Thimble Theatre/Popeye
- Swee waxbill (Estrilda melanotis), a common species of estrildid finch found in Sub-Saharan Africa
