= Wong =

Wong or Mr Wong may refer to:

== Name ==
- Wong (surname), a Chinese surname, listing people and fictional characters with the surname
- Wong (Marvel Comics), manservant/mentor to Doctor Strange Sr./Jr. in Marvel Comics
  - Wong (Marvel Cinematic Universe), the portrayal of the character in the Marvel Cinematic Universe
- Mr. Wong (fictional detective), in short stories created by Hugh Wiley
- Mr. Wong, a Coronation Street character
- Won-G (born 1978), Haitian rapper

== Arts and entertainment ==
- Mr. Wong (web series), an internet television series
- Mr. Wong, Detective, a 1938 American crime film
- Mr. Wong, a 1963 Filipino film starring Chiquito
- "Wong" (Marvel Studios: Legends), an episode of Marvel Studios: Legends

== Businesses and organisations ==
- WONG, a radio station (1150 AM) in Canton, Mississippi, USA
- Wong (supermarket), a supermarket chain in Peru
- Mister Wong, a social bookmarking website

== See also ==
- Huang (disambiguation)
- Wang (disambiguation)
- Ng (name)
