= Yuan Tianmu =

Northern Wei general (489–530)

- 元天穆

Grand Chancellor (太宰)
- In office 529–530
- Monarch: Emperor Xiaozhuang of Northern Wei

Personal details
- Born: 489 Luoyang, Henan
- Died: 1 November 530 Luoyang, Henan
- Relations: Tuoba Yulü (ancestor)
- Children: Yuan Yan; Lady Yuan
- Parent: Yuan Changsheng (father)
- Courtesy name: Tianmu (天穆)
- Peerage: Prince of Shangdang (上党王)
- Posthumous name: Wuzhao (武昭)

Yuan Tianmu (489–1 November 530), courtesy name Tianmu, was a military general of the Northern Wei during the Northern and Southern dynasties period. A distant member of the ruling Yuan clan, he quickly rose to prominence through his partnership with the commander, Erzhu Rong. He participated in the suppression of Ge Rong and Xing Gao, and played a role in the defence against Chen Qingzhi's northern expedition. Erzhu trusted him even more than his own relatives, but in 530, the two were lured into an ambush in Luoyang and killed by Emperor Xiaozhuang of Northern Wei.

== Background ==
Yuan Tianmu was a member of the ruling Yuan family of Northern Wei, being a descendant of Tuoba Yulü, although his relation to the imperial ruling clan was distant. He was described as a gentle and honest person with a beautiful appearance. He was also good at archery and had a reputation for being competent, beginning his career at 20 as a Communications Regular Mounted Attendant and Literary Official, before becoming a Dietary Supervisor and Assistant to the Grand Commandant.

== Service under Erzhu Rong ==
=== Meeting Erzhu Rong ===
When the rebellion of the Six Garrisons broke out, the Prince of Guangyang, Yuan Yuan and minister, Li Chong went on a northern expedition, and Yuan Tianmu was assigned to alleviating the soldiers. When passing through Xiurong Commandery (秀容, in modern Shuozhou, Shanxi), he came across the general, Erzhu Rong, who was impressed by his orderly laws and general's temperament. The two became friends and were described as close as brothers. Soon, Erzhu requested that Yuan be appointed a Branch Censorate, but the court disapproved, only making him a Colonel and instructing him to remain at Xiurong. However, as Erzhu was one of the few commanders with the military capacity to oppose the rebels, Yuan by association was eventually appointed the Branch Censorate of the Northwestern Circuits, General Who Attacks Barbarians and Inspector of Bing province.

Yuan Tianmu also followed Erzhu in his campaigns against the Six Garrison rebels, and after accumulating victories, he was made Founding Earl of Liaocheng County and General Who Pacifies the North while retaining his other positions. He also served as acting General Who Pacifies the Army while concurrently serving as the Branch Censorate of the Masters of Writing.

When Erzhu Rong led his troops to the capital, Luoyang to depose Empress Dowager Hu in May 528, Yuan Tianmu was involved in the initial planning and ordered to remain behind to act as reserves. After Emperor Xiaozhuang ascended the throne, he was specifically appointed as the Grand Commandant and enfeoffed the Prince of Shangdang. He was also granted tally and appointed as a Palace Attendant, General Who Leads the Army, Grand General of Agile Cavalry and Grand Chief Controller of the Capital.

=== Campaign against Ge Rong and Xing Gao ===
Soon, Erzhu left to fight against the rebel, Ge Rong, stationing Yuan Tianmu back in Luoyang. In July, Emperor Xiaozhuang appointed Yuan Tianmu as Chief Controller of military affairs of the Northeastern Circuits and Grand Chief Controller before ordering him to lead Zongzheng Zhensun (宗正珍孫), Xi Yi (奚毅), Heba Sheng and Erzhu Yangdu (爾朱陽都) among others with the capital army to attack Ge Rong's general, Ren Bao (任褒) at Qinshui County. In October, the emperor then instructed Yuan to attack Ge Rong and camp south of Chaoge. After Erzhu Rong captured Ge Rong alive, Yuan's fief was increased to 30,000 households. He was soon turned into the Prime Historiographer and Manager of the Affairs of the Masters of Writing. In December, he was appointed Grand General and Hereditary Inspector of Bing province, and granted privilege of opening a Separate Office.

In April 529, Emperor Xiaozhuang commissioned for Yuan Tianmu and Gao Huan to quell a rebellion led by Xing Gao in Qing province. At the time, the Prince of Beihai, Yuan Hao and the Liang general, Chen Qingzhi were invading from the south, so Yuan Tianmu brought his generals together to discuss if he should go after Yuan Hao or Xing Gao first. As majority of the generals insisted on the latter, Yuan ignored Yuan Hao and continued his march east. In May, Yuan and Gao defeated the rebels at Jinan. Xing Gao surrendered and was sent to the capital, where he was beheaded. Yuan Tianmu was granted an additional 10,000 households.

=== Chen Qingzhi's Northern Expedition ===
While he was away, however, Yuan Hao and Chen Qingzhi managed to seize control of Luoyang, forcing Emperor Xiaozhuang to flee north. Having pacified the rebellion, Yuan Tianmu and the general, Fei Mu prepared to attack Yuan Hao. Yuan Tianmu led 40,000 soldiers to capture Daliang, while Fei Mu brought 20,000 soldiers to besiege Hulao. In response, Yuan Hao sent Chen Qingzhi to repel Fei Mu. As the battle of Hulao was about to be lost, Yuan Tianmu became worried and wanted to cross north of the Yellow River to join Emperor Xiaozhuang. His subordinate, Wen Zisheng asserted that recapturing the capital would elevate his prestige to new heights, but though he agreed, Yuan decided not to adopt his plan. He crossed the river from Bigong Rampart (畢公壘) and met the emperor at Henei Commandery. When Erzhu Rong wanted to withdraw his troops because of the hot weather, Yuan Tianmu insisted against the idea, so Erzhu opted not to.

After Emperor Xiaozhuang returned to Luoyang in August, he appointed Yuan Tianmu as the Grand Chancellor and Minister of Over the Masses. He was also rewarded with a ceremonial guard and a troupe of musicians, while his fiefdom was increased to a further 70,000 households. A few days later, Emperor Xiaozhuang held a banquet at the capital pavilion to entertain Erzhu, Yuan and the officials that came with him from the north, rewarding them according to their rank. In October, Xiaozhuang ordered Xi Yi to present Erzhu and Yuan with administrative titles for them to hand out to their grandfathers, uncles and elders.

== Death and posthumous honours ==
Yuan did not receive much prestige and favour due to his very distant relation with the imperial family, but under Erzhu, who treated him with the courtesy of an elder brother, he began receiving lofty titles and positions and became a highly sought-after figure, receiving reverence from both the court and public. His mansion was always crowded with nobles and officials while he accepted bribes and accumulated a trove of treasures. However, he was also kind and tolerant, so he was not heavily criticized by the people of his time. Seeing that Yuan was a trusted confidant of Erzhu, Emperor Xiaozhuang outwardly showed favour and respect to him, even authorizing him to ride his carriage through the Grand Marshal's Gate. Erzhu's relatives, despite holding high positions themselves, remained wary of the favour that Yuan was receivin. On one occasion, Yuan Tianmu criticized Erzhu's cousin, Erzhu Shilong, and Erzhu promptly had his cousin beaten with a cane.

As Erzhu Rong's power over the court grew day by day, so did Emperor Xiaozhuang's resentment for him. Due to his association with Erzhu, the emperor also feared and loathed Yuan Tianmu. In 530, Xiaozhuang summoned Erzhu Rong to Luoyang on the basis that Empress Erzhu was about to give birth to their child. Yuan Tianmu followed Erzhu from Jinyang to the capital to pay tribute, but on 1 November, he and Erzhu were killed in an ambush at the Mingguang Hall (明光殿) set by the emperor.

In 531, Emperor Jiemin of Northern Wei, who was installed to the throne by the Erzhu clan, posthumously appointed him as Palace Attendant, Grand Chancellor, Chief Controller of military affairs of ten provinces, Grand General of the Pillars of State, Bearer of the Gilded-Mace and Inspector of Yong province. He was also given the fief of Prince of Shangdang and the posthumous name of "Wuzhao". On 7 September that year, his body was reburied 20 li northwest of Luoyang.

== Sources ==
- Book of Wei
- History of the Northern Dynasties
- Zizhi Tongjian
