= Xing Gao =

Northern Wei rebel (died 529)

Xing Gao (Chinese: 邢杲; pinyin: Xíng Gǎo; died 529) was a Chinese rebel of the Northern Wei during the Northern and Southern Dynasties period. During the final years of the Northern Wei, he led refugees affected by Ge Rong and Du Luozhou's uprising in Hebei to the Shandong region. In 528, taking advantage of the refugees' oppression at the hands of the local populace, Xing Gao rebelled and proclaimed himself the King of Han. His rebellion lasted around a year before he was defeated by Wei forces led by the Prince of Shangdang, Yuan Tianmu.

== Background ==
Xing Gao born in Mao County (鄚縣; in present-day Renqiu, Hebei), Hejian Commandery to a wealthy Chinese landowning family in the commandery. He initially served as a registrar in Pingbei Prefecture (平北府), You province. During the outbreak of Du Luozhou and Ge Rong's rebellion in 526, he brought his forces to defend the city of Mocheng (莫城; also in present-day Renqiu) and opposed them for roughly three years. As the imperial forces suffered a string of defeats and the power of the rebel armies grew, Xing Gao brought with him 10,000 refugees from the Hebei region to cross south of the Yellow River and occupy Beihai Commandery in Qing province.

The Hebei refugees were treated poorly by the natives of the Shandong region. Empress Dowager Hu planned on establishing new counties and commanderies for the refugees in Qing, and the provincial inspector, Yuan Shijun even petitioned for the creation of Xin'an Commandery (新安郡), with Xing Gao to serve as the commandery's first Administrator. However, the petition never came to fruition; instead, Xing Gao soon received news that his cousin, Xing Ziyao (邢子瑤) was appointed Administrator in their hometown of Hejian, which left him humiliated and resentful.

In June or July 528, Xing Gao rebelled, proclaiming himself the King of Han and changing the reign era to Tiantong (天統). He received widespread support among the Hebei refugees, and within ten days, his forces grew to 100,000. At the time, the people of Henan often mocked the Hebei natives for their obsession with elm leaves. As Xing Gao and his followers plundered and killed wherever they went, the people of Shandong therefore gave them the derisive name of "Elm-eating Bandits" (𦧟榆賊). The rebels marched eastward, conquering Guang province (光州; area east of the Jiaolai river in Shandong) all the way to the sea before returning.

The Wei court commissioned the general, Li Shuren (李叔仁) to suppress Xing Gao's uprising. Soon, another general, Yang Kan rebelled in the neighbouring province of Yan as well. The court decided to appease Xing Gao by sending the general, Han Zixi (韩子熙) to persuade him into surrendering. Xing pretended to agree and then immediately attacked the Wei army along the Wei river, defeating Li Shuren. Yang Kan had also rejected offers to submit, so the court dispatched the general, Yu Hui (于晖), accompanied by Gao Huan and Erzhu Yangdu (爾朱陽都) among others, to campaign against them with 100,000 soldiers. After defeating Yang Kan, Yu Hui turned to Xing Gao, but in January or February 529, he was forced to withdraw when one of his subordinates, Peng Le suddenly abandoned them to join another rebel group in You province led by Han Lou.

In March or April, the court appointed the Prince of Shangdang, Yuan Tianmu to lead Fei Mu, Gao Huan and Erzhu Zhao among others in defeating Xing Gao once and for all. The following month, Yuan Tianmu's forces decisively defeated Xing Gao at Jinan. Subsequently, Xing surrendered and was sent to the capital, Luoyang, where he was beheaded.

== Sources ==
- Book of Wei
- History of the Northern Dynasties
- Zizhi Tongjian
