= Ng Woon Lam =

Ng Woon Lam (黄运南)
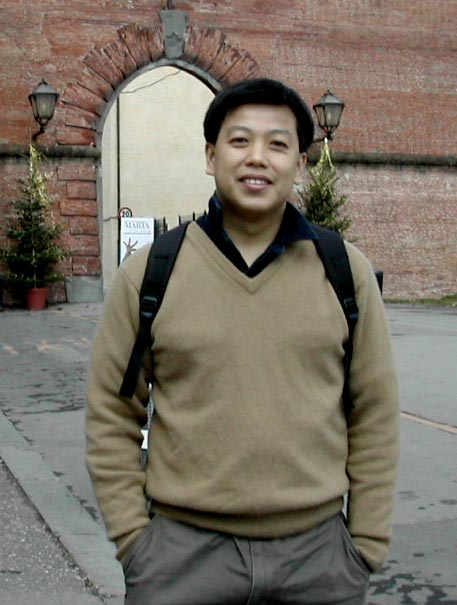
- Born: 1971 (age 53–54); Johor, Malaysia
- Education: New York Academy of Art Master of Fine in Figurative Painting
- Known for: Watercolor, oil painting
- Awards: American Watercolor Society 142nd International Juried Show 2009, AWS Bronze Medal of Honor; National Watercolor Society 82nd International Juried Show 2002 Philadelphia Water Color Society Award, Singapore Art Society 2007 National Open Juried Show 1st Prize in Western Representational Painting

Ng Woon Lam (黄运南) is a full member of National Watercolor Society NWS and American Watercolor Society.

He showed in National Watercolor Society eightieth and eighty-second international exhibition, American Watercolor Society 139th, 140th and 142nd international annual show, 2003 Florence Biennale and 2006 Oil Painters of America 15th Annual National Show.

He learnt from Singapore master watercolour artist Mr. Gog Sing Hooi, late and founding president of Singapore Watercolour Society, Associate Professor Emeritus Cheng-Khee Chee (University of Minnesota at Duluth)

Associate Professor Don Southard and Professor Susanna Coffey at The School of the Art Institute of Chicago and Professor Edward Schmidt at New York Academy of Art.

His painting style carries Chinese calligraphic strokes; showing strong influence from master Singapore watercolour artist Gog Sing Hooi.

His philosophy of image making is derived from Taiji (太极) philosophy. He is constantly searching for balance and harmony in the dynamic image making process. This is similar to the fundamental building of Chinese Painting His journal related to Chinese and Western calligraphic brushwork was published in year 2016.

He is a tenured Associate Professor at the School of Art, Design and Media, Nanyang Technological University, Singapore since 2019. His journals and publications can be found at Google Scholar.

== Publications ==
- Practical application of browns and grays based on a vector concept—The practical strength the asymmetrical Munsell color space
- Development of 3D Color Space to Improve Learning of Color Theory
- Tonal Design: A Mathematical Guide in Constructing Mood and Weather
- Comparison of Chinese Calligraphy and Ink Painting Brushes with Western Water-Media Painting Brushes
- A New Approach for The Teaching of Practical Color Theory

== Books ==
- Practical applications of color theory & design concepts
- Alchemy of color and brushwork
- A jazz of colors and shapes
- Perception and Delusion
- A tale of 3 cities: Ng Woon Lam's watercolors & oil paintings 2013
- Ng Woon Lam watercolor & oil painting 2011: live & alive

== Major awards ==
- 2014 American Watercolor Society 147th International Juried Show 2014, AWS Bronze Medal of Honor.
- 2009 American Watercolor Society 142nd International Juried Show 2009, AWS Bronze Medal of Honor.
- 2002 National Watercolor Society 82nd International Juried Show Philadelphia Water Color Society Award.
- Singapore Art Society 2007 National Open Juried Show 1st Prize in Western Representational Painting.

He contributed to major art journals: Watercolor Magic, The Artist's Magazine and International Artist His watercolor artwork Trafalgar was included in Watercolor Splash 8 New Discovery.

== Education ==
- Nanyang Technological University Bachelor of Applied Science, Materials Engineering.
- National University of Singapore Master of Science, Materials Engineering and Science.
- New York Academy of Art Master of Fine Art, Figurative Painting
- His artworks are represented by Li Fine Art Gallery, Singapore
