= Fu Linguo =

Chinese army officer

- 符林国
- Born: 1964 (age 61–62); Yinjiang Tujia and Miao Autonomous County, Guizhou, China
- Military career
- Allegiance: People's Republic of China
- Branch: People's Liberation Army Ground Force
- Rank: Major general
- Commands: Deputy Chief of Staff of Command of the People's Liberation Army General Logistics Department

Fu Linguo (simplified Chinese: 符林国; traditional Chinese: 符林國; pinyin: Fú Lìnguó; born 1964) is a former major general in the People's Liberation Army of China. He joined the PLA in 1981 and attained the rank of major general in July 2010. In May 2014 he was placed under investigation by the PLA's anti-corruption agency. Previously he served as Deputy Chief of Staff of the PLA General Logistics Department (GLD). He once served as the secretary of Liao Xilong, while Liao was Head of the GLD.
