= Chen Qingzhi =

Liang dynasty general (484-539)

- 陳慶之

General of Soaring Courage (飆勇將軍)
- In office 528–529
- Monarch: Emperor Wu of Liang

Personal details
- Born: 484 Yixing, Jiangsu
- Died: November 539
- Children: Chen Zhao; Chen Xin; Chen Xuan
- Courtesy name: Ziyun (子雲)
- Peerage: Marquis of Yongxing County (永興縣侯)
- Posthumous name: Wu (武)

Chen Qingzhi (simplified Chinese: 陈庆之; traditional Chinese: 陳慶之; pinyin: Chēn Qìngzhī; 484–c.November 539), courtesy name Ziyun (simplified Chinese: 子云; traditional Chinese: 子雲; pinyin: Zīyūn), was a prominent general of the Liang dynasty. He is best known for his campaign in 528 to 529 to crush Northern Wei. With an alleged force of only 7,000 soldiers, he invaded Northern Wei and conquered the regions of modern Henan and Shandong. However, he lost them again after being counterattacked by a Wei force ten times larger. Despite this, his success in conquering Northern China, albeit briefly, with (allegedly) only 7,000 soldiers made him a famous commander in Chinese history.

== Background and pre-northern campaign ==
Chen Qingzhi was from Guoshan County in Yixing Commandery. He joined Emperor Wu of Liang when he was still young. Emperor Wu enjoyed playing weiqi, often doing so from night till dawn. While most of his attendants have fallen asleep, Chen stayed up throughout the night, responding immediately whenever Emperor Wu wanted to have a game; this earned Emperor Wu's admiration.

On 22 February 525, (Note: This date is per the biography of Emperor Xiaoming of Northern Wei in Book of Wei; the volume also gave its version of events surrounding Yuan Faseng's surrender to Liang; this account did not mention Chen Qingzhi, but did mention Hu Longya and Cheng Jingjun. Chen Qingzhi's biography in Liang Shu only stated that Yuan's revolt occurred during the Pu'tong era (520-527). Vol.150 of Zizhi Tongjian did mention Chen Qingzhi in its account of events surrounding Yuan's revolt.) Northern Wei's Inspector of Xu Province Yuan Faseng (Chinese: 元法僧; pinyin: Yuán Fǎsēng) revolted and requested to surrender to Liang. Emperor Wu sent Chen, along with Hu Longya (Chinese: 胡龙牙; pinyin: Hú Lóngyá) and Cheng Jingjun (Chinese: 成景儁; pinyin: Chéng Jǐngjùn) to assist Yuan. After this assignment, he was given an army of 2,000 and ordered to escort Prince of Yuzhang Xiao Zong (萧综) to Xu Province. Northern Wei sent Prince of Anfeng Yuan Yanming (元延明) and Prince of Linhuai Yuan Yu (元彧) along with an army of 20,000 against the Liang army. Yuan Yanming ordered his subordinate Qiu Daqian (Chinese: 丘大千; pinyin: Qīu Dàqiān) to establish fortifications at Xunliang (浔梁); Chen attacked Qiu while the fortification were still weak, and routed Qiu's army within a single round of drums. Later, on 23 July, as Northern Wei troops surrounded Pengcheng (彭城), Xiao Zong surrendered to Northern Wei, and Liang troops deserted en masse. While the other generals could not stop their troops from deserting, Chen managed to lead his troops in an orderly retreat.

== Campaign against Northern Wei ==
On 31 October 528, (Note: The biography of Emperor Xiaozhuang of Northern Wei in Book of Wei recorded that Yuan Hao was made a pretender to the Northern Wei throne by Xiao Yan and invaded in the 10th month of the 1st year of the Yong'an era; the month corresponds to 29 Oct to 26 Nov 528 in the Julian calendar.) Chen Qingzhi, with only 7,000 troops, invaded Northern Wei, to make Yuan Hao, emperor of Northern Wei. In c.May 529, at Liangguo, Chen's 7,000 men defeated Qiu Daqian's Northern Wei army of 70,000 men in a battle that lasted half a day, and Qiu Daqian surrendered. Chen then attacked Kaocheng, held by Yuan Huiye with 20,000 Northern Wei imperial guards. The city fell and Yuan was captured.

Next, Chen attacked Xingyang, but was unable to take it because of its strong garrison of 70,000 troops. A Northern Wei army of 300,000 under Yuan Tianmu and Erzhu Zhao was arriving soon to relieve Xingyang, so Chen rallied his men with a speech:

"Ever since we entered Wei territory, we have been capturing land, slaughtering many people in the cities we took. You have killed many peoples' fathers and brothers, and taken many people's children as slaves. Yuan Tianmu's soldiers are all our bitter enemies now. We have only 7,000 men, but the barbarians have over 300,000. Today, the only way for us to survive against the odds is to resolve to fight and die. The barbarians have too many cavalries for us to handle, so we cannot engage them on the plain. We should take advantage of their not having arrived yet, and attack Xingyang with all we've got, capture it, and then hold out. Let's not hesitate. It's time to take some heads!"

Chen then led his troops to storm the walls of Xingyang, capturing it at last. However, more than 500 Liang soldiers were killed or injured. Before long, Yuan Tianmu and Erzhu Zhao arrived with their 300,000 troops, straight from Ji'nan (in Shandong). They surrounded Xingyang, but Chen led 3,000 cavalries out and smashed them (against odds of 100 to 1). Next, Chen moved west and attacked the Hulao Pass, and the Wei commanding general Erzhu Shilong abandoned the Pass and fled. Luoyang was left open to attack by Chen, and Emperor Xiaozhuang of Northern Wei abandoned the city and fled across the Yellow River to Henei. Chen was thus able to enter the capital city with his army and set Yuan Hao up as the new Wei emperor.

Unfortunately, Yuan Hao did not wish to remain a puppet of the Liang dynasty and refused Chen's request for more elite Liang reinforcements. To prevent Chen from getting reinforcements behind his back, he even wrote to Emperor Wu of Liang Xiao Yan claiming that the situation was under control and that it would be unwise to send more Liang occupation troops in, in case it aroused more resentment among the people of the captured Northern Wei cities. Xiao Yan thus halted the movement of reinforcements from the Liang-Wei border. To make matters worse, Chen's soldiers committed abuses and atrocities on the people of Luoyang, losing all local support, while Yuan Hao also proved an inept and self-indulgent ruler.

Within less than two months of Yuan Hao's entry into Luoyang, the Northern Wei loyalist counterattack succeeded despite fierce resistance from Chen's army, and Yuan Hao fled from the city. (Note: Yuan Hao himself would be killed in flight by Jiang Feng (江丰), with his head reaching Luoyang on 13 Aug 529. Emperor Xiaozhuang's biography in Book of Wei dated Yuan's death to the same day, but with the month and year recorded as the 7th month of the 2nd year of the Yong'an era. However, Emperor Wu's biography in Book of Liang and History of the Southern Dynasties recorded that it was Erzhu Rong who killed Yuan Hao on 19 Aug 529.) Chen led his troops on an orderly retreat, pursued by Erzhu Rong. But his army was caught in a flash flood at the Mount Song River (outside Luoyang), and almost completely destroyed - most of the troops either died or deserted. Chen himself escaped back to the south after shaving his head and disguising himself as a monk. Despite the overall failure of the campaign, upon Chen's return to Jiankang, Emperor Wu still rewarded Chen by making him General of the Right Guard and Marquis of Yongxing County, with a fiefdom of 1500 households.

=== Modern research ===
The heroics of Chen Qingzhi's northern expedition are mostly found in the Book of Liang, the official history of the Liang dynasty written by Yao Cha and his son Yao Silian (both former officials of the Chen dynasty in the south) during the later Sui-Tang era. Their northern counterpart, the Book of Wei, written during the Northern Qi era, provides a different and less dramatic retelling of events.

Modern historians believe that the numbers of soldiers that the Book of Liang states are exaggerated; new research concludes that Chen merely defeated a vanguard of 5,000 horsemen led by Erzhu Zhao, and another vanguard of 9,000 men led by Lu An at Xingyang. The Book of Wei states that at the time of Chen's expedition, Yuan Tianmu was on a military campaign in the Shandong region to suppress the rebel, Xing Gao. Yuan only participated in the defence after Emperor Xiaozhuang had fled north, meaning he could not have been at Xingyang with 300,000 troops. Luoyang was also not taken by Chen but rather Yuan Hao, who was not a puppet of Chen and probably had a bigger army. Two months later, Northern Wei's paramount general, Erzhu Rong, came back with a large force to retake Luoyang, which Chen was naturally unable to stop.

== Post-northern campaign ==
On 9 April 535, Chen, as Inspector of Sizhou, attacked Eastern Wei. His battles with Eastern Wei's Inspector of Yuzhou Yao Xiong (尧雄) were disadvantageous, and Chen retreated.

On c.9 December 536, Eastern Wei sent Hou Jing, along with 70000 men, to raid Chuzhou (楚州), killing its inspector (刺史) Huan He (桓和). Hou then wrote a letter to Chen, advising him to surrender. While Emperor Wu sent troops to reinforce Chen, by the time the reinforcements reached Lijiang (黎浆), Chen had already defeated Hou. As it was during winter, Hou abandoned his army's supplies during his retreat, and these supplies were recovered by Chen's troops. Earlier in the same year, (Note: The 2nd year of the Da'tong era corresponds to 8 Feb 536 to 26 Jan 537 in the Julian calendar.) there was a famine in Yuzhou (豫州); Chen allowed the populace to take supplies from the official granaries. About 800 locals, led by Li Sheng (李升), wrote a petition to Emperor Wu, requesting that a stele be erected to commemorate Chen's deeds; Emperor Wu agreed.

== Personality and attributes ==
Chen was recorded to be unable to shoot an arrow with great force, (Note: The same expression (射不穿札) was also used to describe Du Yu in Book of Jin.) and was not skilled with riding a horse. However, he treated his troops kindly, and was able to secure their undying allegiance.

== Relatives ==
Chen was recorded to have at least six sons, but only his eldest (Note: Chen Zhao (Chinese: 陈昭; pinyin: Chēn Zhāo), who inherited his peerage), fifth (Chen Xin (Chinese: 陈昕; pinyin: Chēn Xīn); 516? - 548) (Note: Chen Xin's biography in Book of Liang recorded that he was 12 (by East Asian reckoning) when he followed his father to Luoyang during the northern campaign (529), and that he was 33 (by East Asian reckoning) when he was killed by Hou Jing in 548. Thus, Chen Xin's birth year was either 516 or 518. His biography in Nan Shi did not mention his age when he died.) and youngest son (Note: Chen Xuan (Chinese: 陈暄; pinyin: Chēn Xuān); Chen Xuan only had a biography in vol.61 of Nan Shi, although he was mentioned sparsely in Book of Chen.) were named. In Chen Xuan's biography in History of the Southern Dynasties, a son of his elder brother, Chen Xiu (Chinese: 陈秀; pinyin: Chēn Xiù), was mentioned.

== Popular culture ==
Chen Qingzhi is one of the 32 historical figures who appear as special characters in the video game Romance of the Three Kingdoms XI by Koei.
