= Pacific Andes =

Seafood company

Pacific Andes Food Ltd
- Company type: Public company
- Traded as: SEHK: 1174
- Industry: Food
- Founded: 1986
- Founder: Ng Swee Hong
- Products: Frozen deep-sea fish, fish products
- Website: www.pacificandes.com

Pacific Andes International Holdings is an Asian vertically integrated seafood company.

The company was founded in Hong Kong by Ng Swee Hong and his 6 children. It was initially a private company focused on the import and resale of shrimp primarily to Taiwan, quickly expanding into harvesting and globally distributing shrimp. In the early 1990s, the company diversified by purchasing deep-sea fish, largely Alaska pollock from Russian trawlers, for processing and export. Pacific Andes issued stock for the first time in 1994, with shares listed on the Hong Kong Stock Exchange, and a subsidiary began trading shares in Singapore in 1996. Late in the 1990s and into the 2000s, the company expanded processing facilities in China and Peru, becoming the world's largest producer of fish fillets in the world by 2007. By 2016, it had grown into the 12th largest seafood company in the world, with controlling interests in several subsidiaries worldwide.

It has a majority stake in Singaporean companies Pacific Andes Resources Development, which operates in seafood trade and logistics, and China Fishery Group, which engages in fish harvest and processing, and American company National Seafood, which processes and distributes seafood products. It also has a stake in German fish processor Pickenpack.

In July 2016, Pacific Andes filed for bankruptcy due to a combination of high debt and poor harvests that resulted from weather patterns and low stocks of fish in the Peruvian fishing grounds, a major area of operations for the company. By February 2017, several Pacific Andes subsidiaries were undergoing liquidation.

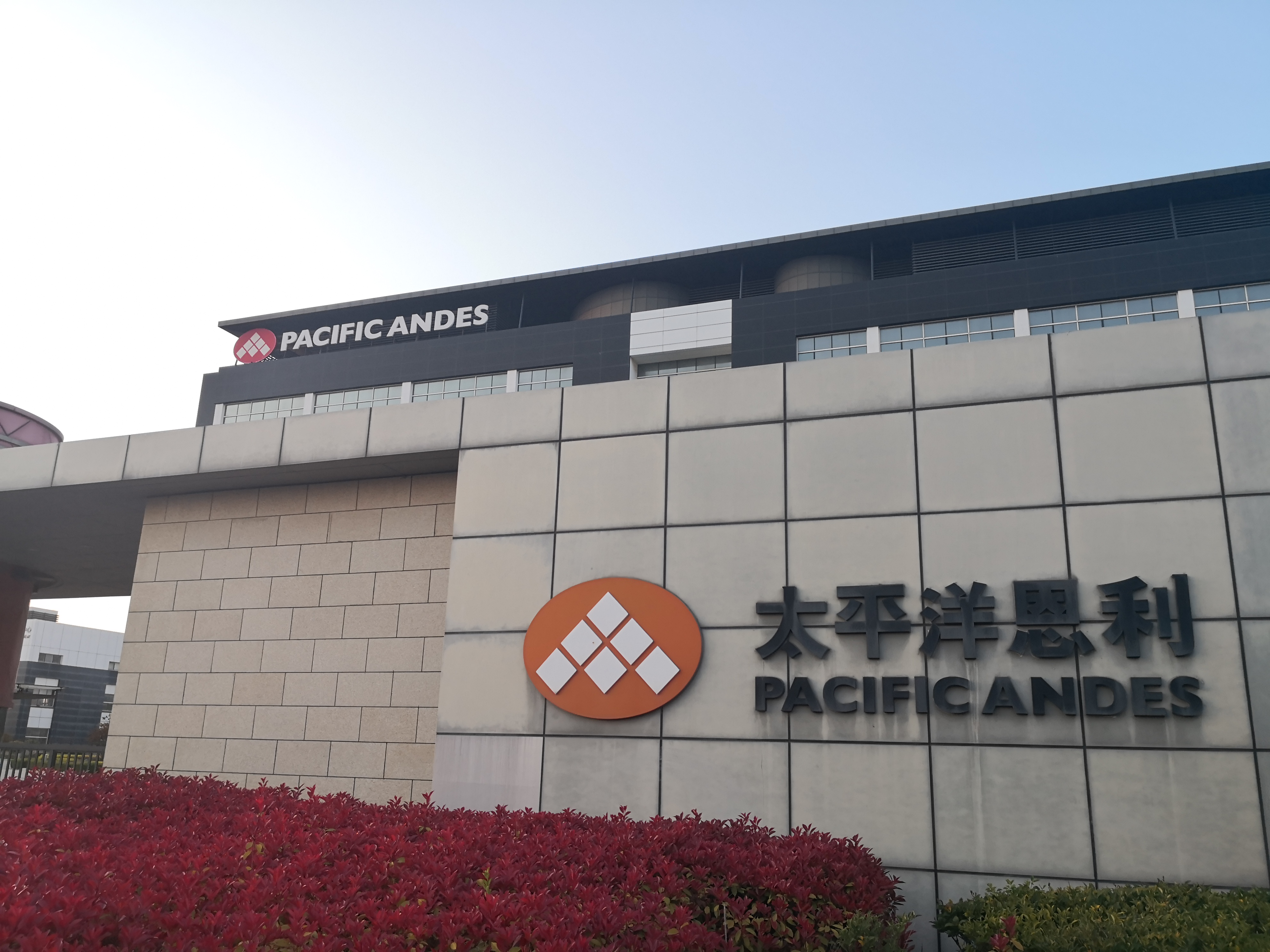
Pacific Andes in Qingdao, China
