= Maria Whang =

Korean-American educator and community organizer

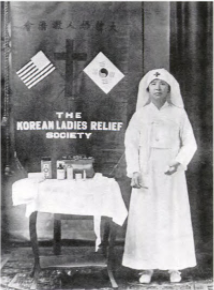
Maria Whang, The Korean Ladies Relief Society, c. 1919

Maria Whang (1865-1937) was a Korean-American educator and community organizer. In 1913, she became the first leader of the Korean Women's Association in the Territory of Hawaii. Whang was born in Pyongan Province, Korea. In 1905, she emigrated to Hawaii with her daughter and two sons. When they arrived in Hawaii, she told her son Ok Kang about her escape from her affluent husband who had many mistresses. Whang was a Methodist, and the church assisted her in moving to the United States. She felt that in Korea she was "not allowed to be anything", and desired the freedom she saw in the United States. She was an early educator of plantation children, and she established the Korean Women's Association (Taehan Puinhoe) which merged in 1919 with the Korean Ladies Relief Society.

== Bibliography ==
- Katz, William Loren (1 January 1993). The Great Migrations 1880S-1912. Steck-Vaughn. ISBN 978-0-8114-2915-3.
