= Whang =

Whang is a surname. Notable people with the surname include:

- Whang Bo-ryung (born 1970), South Korean-American singer, songwriter, and painter
- Ha Soo Whang (1892–1984), Korean-American social worker
- Jacqueline Whang-Peng (born 1932), Taiwanese-American physician-scientist
- Maria Whang (1865–1937), Korean-American educator and community organizer
- Nancy Whang (born 1977), American singer and musician
- Sang Whang (1931–2011), Korean-American church leader and community advocate
- Sang-Min Whang (born 1962), South Korean psychologist
- Suzanne Whang (1952–2019), American television host, comedian, radio host, author, minister, writer, producer, and political activist
- Whang Youn Dai (born 1938), South Korean physician

== See also ==
- Huang (surname)
- Hwang (surname)
- Wang (surname)
- Wāng (surname)
