= Vong =

Vong may refer to:

== People ==
- Vong Kan, Cambodian politician
- Vong Phaophanit (born 1961), British artist
- Vong Pisen, Cambodian general
- Vong Sarendy (1929–1975), Fleet Admiral in the Khmer Republic
- Vong Savang (1931–1978), Crown Prince to the throne of the Kingdom of Laos
- Vong Lu Veng (born 1950), Hong Kong table tennis player
- Kan En Vong (born 1899), Chinese kindergarten educator
- Sisavang Vong (1885–1959), king of the Kingdom of Luang Phrabang and Kingdom of Laos
- Tep Vong (born 1932), Cambodian Buddhist monk

== Other uses ==
- VONG, a shortwave relay of CBN (AM) in Newfoundland, Canada
- Vọng cổ, a Vietnamese song and musical structure
- Yuuzhan Vong, a fictional alien species from the Star Wars universe
- Several restaurants owned by French-American chef Jean-Georges Vongerichten

== See also ==
- Wong (surname), a related name
