= Fu (tally) =

Chinese tally

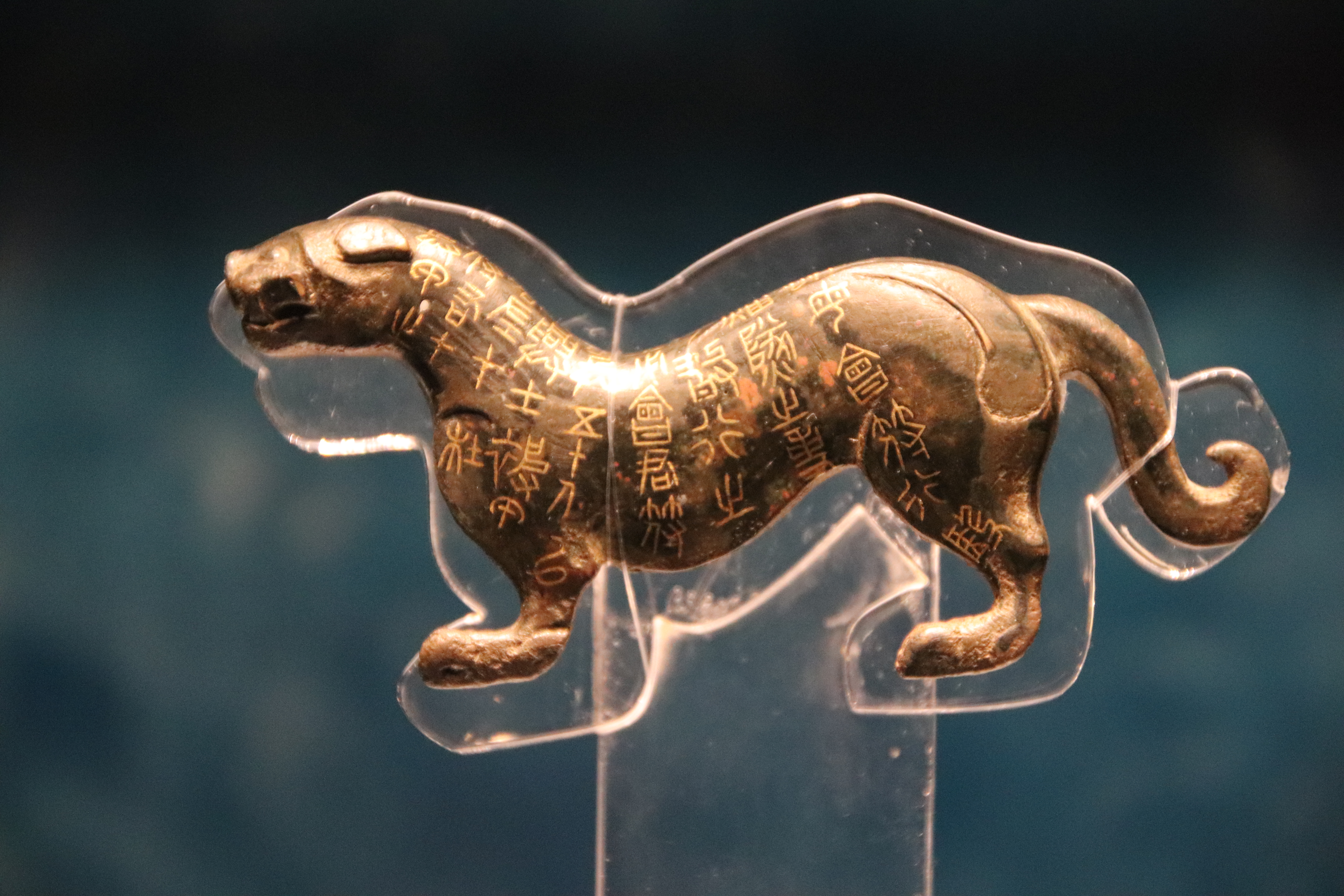
- Tiger tally (Hufu) of Qin dynasty period
- Chinese: 符
Transcriptions
Standard Mandarin
- Hanyu Pinyin: Fú

Fu (Chinese: 符; pinyin: fú) was a tally, which was used as a proof of authorization in ancient China, which typically consists of two parts. Generals would use the fu as an imperial authorization for troop movements and for other purposes while amongst the populace, it was used as a proof of authorization for goods exchanges or for leases. The official fu was made of bamboo, wood, metal (gold, silver, bronze) or jade. Although it could be made in various shapes (such as tiger, dragon, turtle, snake, fish or human), most of them come in the shape of a tiger.

== Terminology ==
The term fu refers to the magical drawings used by the adepts of Taoist and Buddhist tantric masters.

== Shapes of fu ==
Classical description of tallies is found in the Zhou li, which refers to the tallies of jade and horn, and mentions the shapes of tiger, human, dragon, seal, and banner.

=== Toothed tally/Chang ===
A toothed type of tally, called chang, was used in the Early Zhou dynasty; they were used by kings to verify the authenticity of the messages received. They were made of jade.

=== Tiger tally/Hufu ===
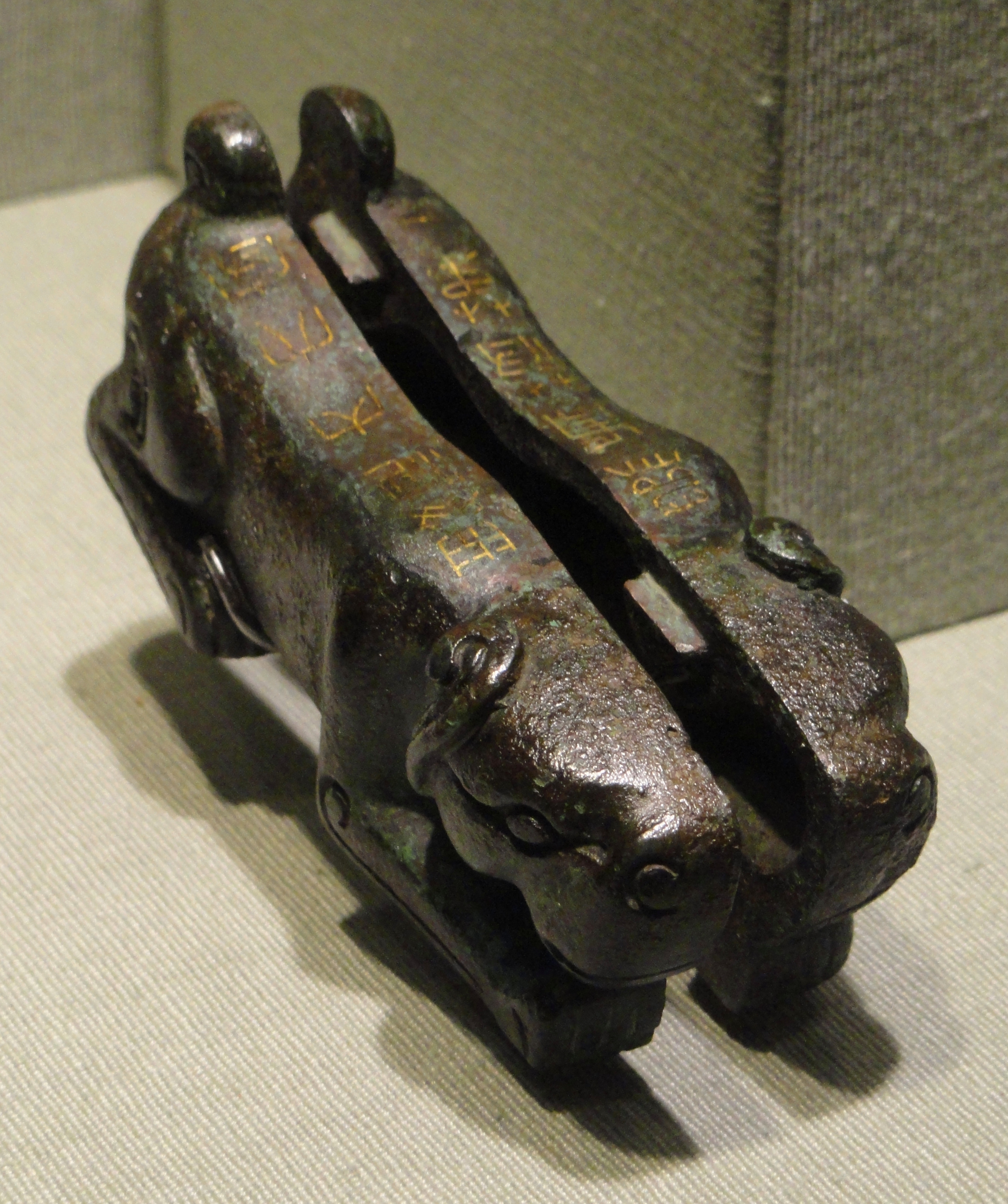
Two-pieces tiger tally (hufu), bronze with gold inlay, 2nd to 1st century BC

Tiger tallies were known as hufu (Chinese: 虎符; pinyin: hǔfú). The word hufu first appears in the biography of Lord Hsin-ling in the Records of the Grand Historian, where a stolen tiger tally is used to relieve the state of Zhao. It was through the tiger tally that the Emperors of China would authorize and delegate the power to his generals to command and dispatch an army. According to the Chinese tradition, the tiger was a symbol of valour; therefore, a tiger-shaped tally symbolized the expectation that an imperial command should be completed as promptly and as courageously as a tiger with the authorization of the emperor.

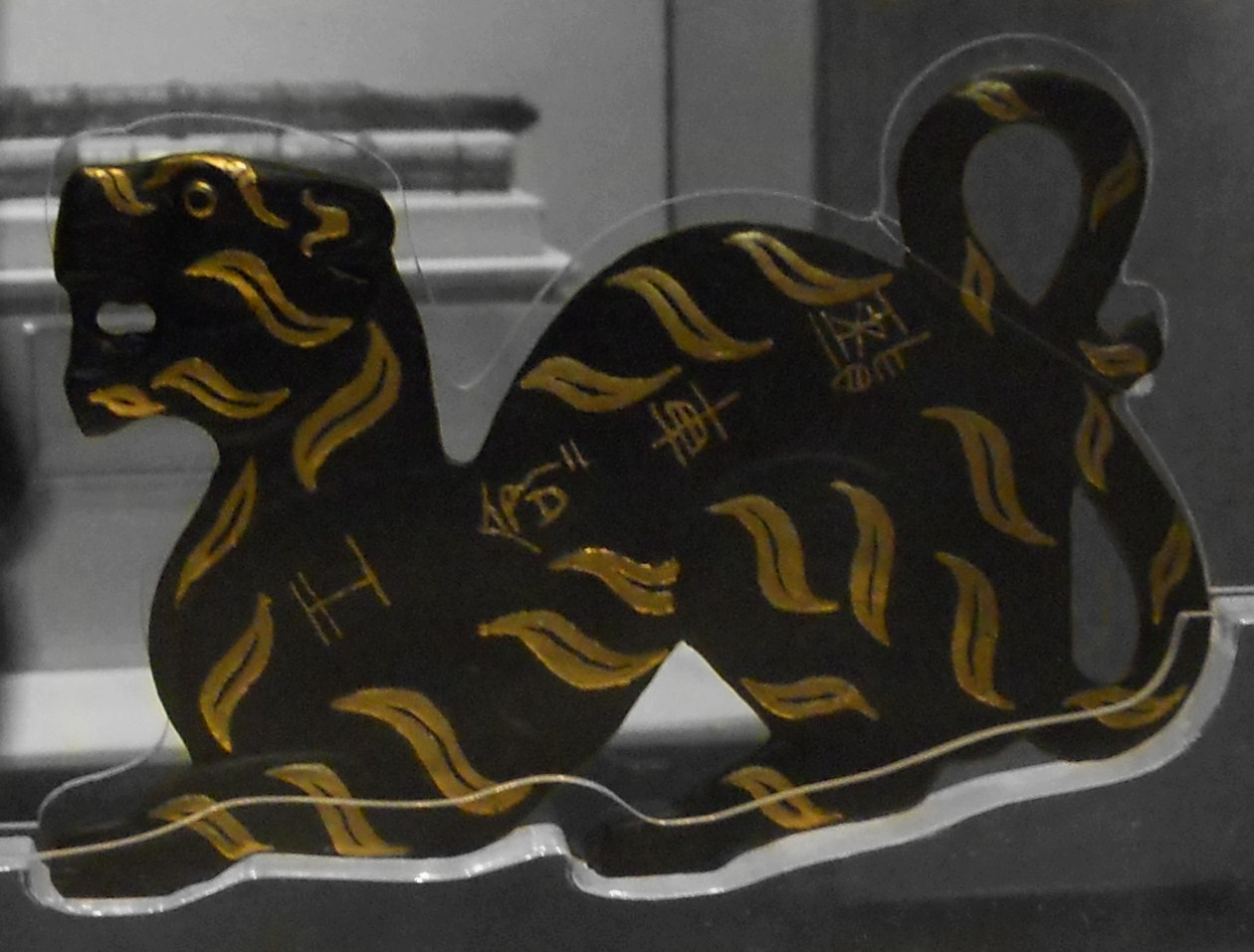
Single-piece tiger tally, from the tomb of King Zhao Mo of Nanyue, Western Han dynasty period

The tiger tally was initially made of jade, but it was eventually made into bronze in the Warring States period. The tiger tally had text inscription on its back and were typically made of two pieces. The two-piece tiger tally was used to verify troop deployment orders from the central government. Left pieces were issued to a local commander or official, and right pieces were retained by the central government. Government orders were deemed to be authentic if they were accompanied by the right piece matching the recipient's left piece; and only when it was deemed authentic and the two-pieced were matched that these orders could take effect and the army could be mobilized. And, when ordered to implement troop order, the imperial court would send the left piece to the official who is carrying the right part. This practice was popular during the Warring States Period, Qin and Han dynasties. The use of tiger tally continued to be used throughout the Han dynasty until the Sui dynasty. (Note: Tiger tally was both used in the Western Han and the Eastern Han dynasties; there are evidences recorded in the Book of Han and the Book of Later Han)

Not all tiger tallies were separated two pieces, or even used as tallies. The tiger tally from the tomb of King Zhao Mo of Nanyue, however, was cast as a single piece. It demonstrates that tiger tally were not uniform and could function as tokens instead of tallies.

=== Fish tally/Yufu ===
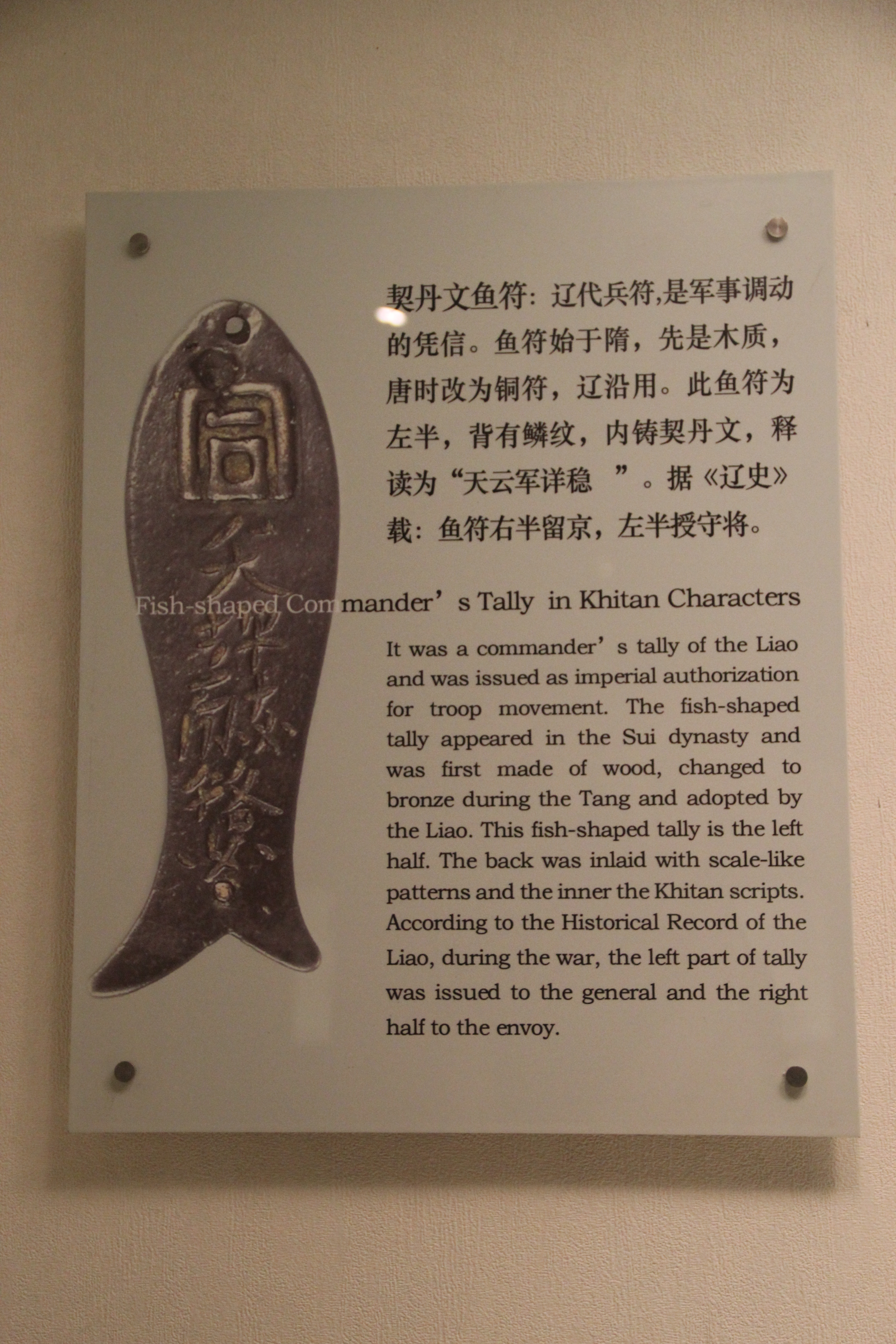
Yufu used in the Liao dynasty

The fish tally is a variant of the tiger tally. Fish tally were also made of two pieces and were known as yufu (Chinese: 魚符; pinyin: yúfú); the fish tally was originally made of copper and was used as a proof of identity in the central and local governments; with time however, they became an item which was used to indicate the position of an official. The fish was also used as a pass to enter or leave the palace gate or the city gate. When used for ordinary contractual purposes, the fish tally was made of simpler materials, typically wood or bamboo.

==== Yudai ====
Painting of a Song dynasty official wearing yudai.

The fish tally was used in the Tang dynasty. All officials above the fifth rank were bestowed a yudai, a fish-shaped tally bag which they would tied to their belts, to hold their fish tally inside. The fish had the name of the officials and their ranks engraved on it; it was the proof of the officials' identity and they to be presented at the entrance of the imperial palace.

In the Song dynasty, the fish tally was not longer used by the officials. However, the Song officials who wore crimson or purple official dress were required to wear a yudai (Chinese: 魚袋; pinyin: yúdài; lit. 'fish bag'). The yudai was made of gold, silver, or jade to mark the official rank of its wearer or as a mark of special favour from the Emperor. Following the Tang dynasty regulation, yudai was worn or hang at the belt of the Song dynasty official's court dress. Low ranking officials who were performing special missions (e.g. diplomatic missions) were also required to wear yudai and were required to borrow a purple or crimson robe before leaving to complete their missions.On the other hand, the Song dynasty painters, who had received favour, were allowed to wear yufu, which was a symbol of high-ranking officials and honour during this period.

== Surnames ==
- Fu (surname 符) was derived from the post of title of an official in charge of the tally; it originated from the post title Fuxiling which was used by Gong Ya, a grandson of Lu Qinggong (died 249BC).

== Related content ==
- Hanfu accessories
- Hebao

== See also ==
- Hanfu
- List of Chinese symbols, designs, and art motifs
