= Ng Swee Hong =

- 黃垂豐
- Born: 1934
- Died: 2006 (aged 71–72)
- Occupation: Businessman
- Years active: 1985–2006
- Known for: Founder of Pacific Andes
- Children: Joo Siang (son)

Ng Swee Hong (Chinese: 黃垂豐; pinyin: Huáng Chuífēng) (1934–2006) was a Malaysian businessman who founded Pacific Andes company.

Ng Swee Hong moved to Singapore in 1963 where he operated trading and real estate ventures until in the wake of general economic depression in the 1980s, and his business were forced to close with about $30 million of debt.

In 1985, Ng and his family moved to Hong Kong, where he and his son Joo Siang founded Pacific Andes, which grew from a regional trader of shrimp to a global fish harvest, processing, and distribution company. Ng remained as chairman until his death in 2006.
