= Ng Soo Hin murders =

1990 double murders of women by a carpenter in Singapore

Foo Chin Chin
- Foo Chin Chin, who was stabbed 14 times before her death
- Born: Foo Chin Chin; 1971; Singapore
- Died: 24 March 1990 (aged 19); East Coast Park, Singapore
- Cause of death: Murdered
- Other name: Alice Foo
- Education: Secondary school drop-out
- Occupation: Unemployed
- Known for: Murder victim

Ng Lee Kheng
- Ng Lee Kheng, who was pushed to her death
- Born: Ng Lee Kheng; 1971; Singapore
- Died: 24 March 1990 (aged 18); Circuit Road, Singapore
- Cause of death: Murdered
- Education: Secondary school drop-out
- Occupation: Production operator
- Known for: Murder victim
- Parent: Ng Sea Lim (father)

Ng Soo Hin (Chinese: 黄树兴; pinyin: Huáng Shùxīng; Pe̍h-ōe-jī: N̂g Sū-hin), a 19-year-old Singaporean carpenter, was charged in March 1990 with the murders of two women Ng Lee Kheng (Chinese: 黄丽卿; pinyin: Huáng Lìqīng; Pe̍h-ūe-jī: N̂g Lĭ-kheng) and Foo Chin Chin (Chinese: 符真真; pinyin: Fǔ Zhēnzhēn; Pha̍k-fa-sṳ: Fù Chṳ̂n-chṳ̂n), and both victims were each other's best friends, while Foo was Ng's girlfriend. At two different locations, both women were found dead on that same night of 24 March 1990, with the first victim Ng being discovered dead due to a fall from one of the HDB flats at Circuit Road, while the second victim Foo was found dead with 14 stab wounds at East Coast Park. While the killings themselves stirred the whole nation, the killer Ng, who eventually stood trial for solely Foo's murder (the second murder charge was stood down), tried to raise a defence of diminished responsibility to rebut the murder charge against him, but after he was found to be mentally sound at the time of the two murders, the trial court found Ng Soo Hin guilty and sentenced him to death.

== Murders ==
On 24 March 1990, two women were found murdered in two different locations across the whole of Singapore, and these murders had shocked the entire nation at that time.

=== Ng Lee Kheng ===
Below a flat at Circuit Road, the first victim, an 18-year-old girl, was allegedly thrown off the 15th floor of the HDB block, and died upon reaching the void deck. Witnesses told the press and police that they saw the girl arguing with a young man while they were both at the corridor and the man was seen hitting the girl. Soon after, the girl was found dead on a void deck, as a result of her falling to her death. Police investigations classified the case as murder, based on the sightings and signs of foul play left at the crime scene. Not only that, three love messages were written with chalk on the walls of the block where the woman was killed, in which these messages were addressed to an "Alice" and signed by "Heng". According to the victim's mother, the name Alice belonged to the best friend of her daughter.

The victim was identified as Ng Lee Kheng (also spelt Ng Lee Khang), an 18-year-old production operator and the eldest of seven children in her family. Her 41-year-old father Ng Sea Lim, a fisherman, told the police that on that night itself, his daughter informed him that she was going to East Coast Park to have a barbeque party with her best friend "Alice" and a few others. He also said he never noticed anything suspicious or any change in Ng's mood prior to her death.

=== Foo Chin Chin ===
Less than three hours after, the second victim, a 19-year-old girl, was also found dead in another location at East Coast Park. The girl was Foo Chin Chin, also known as Alice (the same person mentioned in the love message), who was the first victim Ng's best friend and she was unemployed. Foo and Ng were also classmates from the same secondary school, and according to Ng's father, the girls were very close to one another and often met up, even after they dropped out together at Secondary Two.

Foo was found with 14 stab wounds on her body when she was first discovered dead at the bird sanctuary area of East Coast Park. Police received information that prior to her death, there were four male witnesses (two of them were brothers) who came across her, overhearing her pleading to a man in Mandarin to let her go, but the man, armed with a knife, refused to and even drove the four passers-by away when they attempted to intervene. After that, the four men heard Foo screaming and rushed back to the bird sanctuary area, where Foo died due to a punctured lung. One of the men gave chase after the suspected killer, whom they saw fleeing the scene, but he could not catch up with the murderer. Police investigations thus also classified the case of Foo's death as murder. According to Foo's sister, she stated her sister was unhappy with her boyfriend, who often argued with her and she wanted to break up with him. It was also speculated that Ng might have been asked to help Foo to facilitate the break-up.

The police speculated that the killings may have resulted from a romantic relationship that gone sour between the alleged killer and one of the women. The police were able to identify the suspect, who was subsequently arrested at his home in Bedok on 26 March, two days after the murders took place.

== Arrest and confession ==
Ng Soo Hin, the murderer of Foo Chin Chin and Ng Lee Kheng

On 28 March 1990, the suspect, who was a 19-year-old carpenter named Ng Soo Hin, was charged with two counts of murder for killing Foo Chin Chin and Ng Lee Kheng, and the suspect in question was revealed to be Foo's boyfriend. Under Section 302 of the Penal Code, the penalty for murder was death.

Ng, while in police custody for the murders, confessed that he was responsible for killing Foo while claiming Ng Lee Kheng fell to her death accidentally. He stated that he first knew Foo and Ng Lee Kheng about a year ago. He stated that nearing the day of the murder, he was dissatisfied with Foo for not reciprocating his feelings despite his best efforts to treat her well and having sex with her several times in the past. He was also overwhelmed with jealousy over the relationships Foo shared with other males, for which the jealousy was aggravated by Foo not wishing to reconcile with him and rejection of his love letter. For this, Ng considered Foo as a "heartless" woman and could not endure her behaviour any longer, which formed his intention to kill Foo.

On that night on 24 March 1990, Ng met up with Foo, claiming that Ng Lee Kheng went to East Coast Park first, so as to lure Foo to East Coast Park, which was also the same place where Foo planned to have a barbeque party with Ng Lee Kheng. When they arrived at the bird sanctuary area inside the park, Ng told Foo that he witnessed Ng Lee Kheng falling to her death accidentally but asked that she do not report him, given that he had a criminal record and feared that the police would distrust him and pin him as the killer of Ng Lee Kheng. However, Foo did not agree to his request, and they also argued about the future of their relationship. Afterwards, Ng saw Foo making a phone call with another man for an hour, which became the final straw that caused Ng to execute his plan to murder Foo. Ng lured Foo into the bushes under the pretext he left something inside them, and thus brandished a knife. Ng proceeded to stab Foo fourteen times despite her pleas for Ng to spare her life and let go of her. After which, he fled the scene before Foo's body was discovered. The murder weapon was eventually recovered from the area where Ng told and led the police to during the search for the knife.

Reportedly, Ng told police that he was resigned to the notion that he may be executed for murdering his girlfriend.

== Ng Soo Hin's trial and defence ==
=== Court hearing and testimony ===
Three years after his arrest, Ng Soo Hin stood trial on 26 April 1993 at the High Court solely for the murder of his girlfriend Foo Chin Chin. As for Ng's second murder charge of killing his first victim Ng Lee Kheng, the prosecution - consisting of Han Cher Kwang and Norul Huda Rashid - temporarily stood down the charge and proceeded with the charge of murder for Foo's killing. Defence lawyers Loh Lin Kok and Cheong Aik Chye represented Ng throughout the trial.

During the trial however, Ng, who earlier confessed to committing Foo's murder out of rage and jealousy, recanted many parts of his story (including the motive for the killings), and it was also at this point where Ng finally admitted in court that he indeed murdered Ng Lee Kheng, and he had brutally executed the first killing by pushing Ng Lee Kheng off the 15th storey. In his new testimony to the court, Ng claimed that after he first met the women on 2 January 1990 instead of a year ago as previously said, he felt that Ng Lee Kheng and Foo had allegedly placed a charm on him, causing him to often feel drowsy whenever he was hanging out with the women, and he also felt the same feeling when he tried to have sex with Foo, which he claimed the feeling led to him losing his interest in sex half-way, and thus he planned to kill the women due to the charm, which was his reason why he bought the knife (the same murder weapon used to kill Foo). He also made a phone call to the police one week prior to the killings, telling police he wanted to murder Foo due to a charm.

On the night of 24 March 1990, at around 7pm, Ng Soo Hin, Foo Chin Chin and Ng Lee Kheng went to a flat at Circuit Road, where Foo was to meet up with a friend living there. While Foo went to visit her friend, both Ng Soo Hin and Ng Lee Kheng were engaged in a heated argument, in which blows were exchanged, and it ended with Ng Soo Hin using his two hands to push Ng Lee Kheng off the parapet, leading to her falling to her death. Ng also said he took a knife with him to kill Foo to put a stop to the charm rather than out of jealousy. Ng even claimed that prior to the incident, there was a group of three men intruding his house and assaulted him while armed with knives and guns, with Foo joining the assault and the captors forcing Ng to confess to a burglary case; he stated he never told anyone about the assault and did not seek medical attention. Ng additionally expressed that he felt regret for the crime but could not muster the courage to surrender to the police, and stated the police confession were made up due to his mind being blank at that time.

Subsequently, in May 1993, Ng once again retracted his story and admitted under cross examination he was lying about the charm, and thus returned to his old story of killing the women due to jealousy. Nevertheless, Ng's main defence was that he committed the two killings while suffering from diminished responsibility. Ng's three sisters, elder brother and mother all came to court to testify about his life prior to the murders. They stated that Ng, the ninth of ten children, dropped out of school at Primary 6 and he often cause trouble in school, including truancy, fighting with students and teachers, gambling and theft. They stated that before he turned 13, Ng sniffed glue and drank alcohol. He was also spent 18 months inside a boys home and even underwent two years of reformative training for burglary and theft offences during his youth. They described him as someone who would get violent under the influence of alcohol.

=== Psychiatric evidence ===
Dr Wong Yip Chong, a famous psychiatrist (who was known for his assessment of child killer Adrian Lim), testified that Ng suffered from three psychiatric disorders at the time he killed Foo, mainly a borderline personality disorder, brief reactive psychosis and acute idiosyncratic intoxication. For the first condition, it was evident from Ng showing behaviours of emotional instability, impulsiveness and suicidal attempts a week leading up to the murders; the second condition was due to environmental causes, given Ng's emotional turmoil and bizarre conduct due to his relationship issues; and finally, the third condition was due to mild brain damage caused by Ng's glue sniffing habits, which was compounded by alcohol use and led to Ng's violent behaviour under alcohol influence and his poor memory skills, and his sniffing of glue shortly before the murders. As such, Dr Wong, who described the killings as "bizarre" and the product of an "abnormal mind", submitted that Ng was suffering from diminished responsibility at the time of the double murders, since the combination of his disorders and emotions over Foo's refusal to reconcile with him caused him to kill her.

However, Dr Chan Khim Yew, the prosecution's psychiatric expert and head of the Prisons Medical Unit, rebutted the psychiatric evidence of Dr Wong and instead presented Ng as someone perfectly normal at the time of the murders. Dr Chan stated that to make a credible diagnosis of borderline personality disorder, one must be examined based on his life from 16 months onwards, but Dr Wong did not examine Ng from that point up until he met him before his trial. Ng's actions did not result from psychosis as it was an emotional killing rather than bizarre behaviour due to his jealousy of being rejected by Foo, and besides, if Ng suffered from acute idiosyncratic intoxication, he would not have been able to calmly return home to watch television and act normally as always in the aftermath of the violent outburst, and his interest in sexual activity would have diminished if he indeed had depression. Since the murder of Foo was a crime of passion and Ng was in full control of himself at the time, his defence of diminished responsibility was not to be accepted.

== Death penalty ==
On 26 May 1993, after a trial lasting 22 days, Justice T. S. Sinnathuray (who formerly judged Adrian Lim for murder) delivered his judgement.

In his judgement, Justice Sinnathuray stated that he was satisfied on the balance of probabilities that Ng was not suffering from diminished responsibility at the time of Foo's murder, and he accepted the psychiatric evidence of the prosecution. He also opined that Ng murdered Foo Chin Chin out of jealousy due to her deciding to break up with him and it caused him to premeditate the murder of his girlfriend, hence Ng should be held fully accountable for his actions. As such, Ng's defence of diminished responsibility was rejected. 22-year-old Ng Soo Hin was hence found guilty of murder and sentenced to death.

After the death penalty was pronounced, the prosecution withdrew the second murder charge against Ng for murdering his first victim Ng Lee Kheng that same night of Foo's murder. Foo's mother broke down as she heard the trial judge saying her daughter's name, and after Ng's guilty verdict of murder and death penalty were passed, she tearfully told the press in Chinese that her daughter died an extremely terrible death.

On 3 December 1993, Ng Soo Hin's appeal was dismissed by the Court of Appeal, with the three judges L P Thean, Goh Joon Seng and Warren Khoo affirming Justice Sinnathuray's verdict that Ng was fully conscious of his actions and indeed committed the premeditated murder of Foo Chin Chin due to jealousy. Since the loss of his appeal, Ng was eventually hanged at Changi Prison.

In the aftermath, the Ng Soo Hin female homicide case became a case study inside the 1994 book Mental Disorders and the Law, co-authored by Lee Peng Kok, Molly Cheang and Kuan Tsee Chee. It was also a case study behind the study of the defence of diminished responsibility in law journals.

== See also ==
- Capital punishment in Singapore
