= Huang =

Huang or Hwang may refer to:

== Location ==
- Huang County, former county in Shandong, China, current Longkou City
- Yellow River, or Huang River, in China
- Huangshan, mountain range in Anhui, China
- Huang (state), state in ancient China.
- Hwang River, in Gyeongsangnam-do, South Korea

== People ==
- Emperor of China, titled as Huángdì (皇帝)
- Huang (surname) (黄 / 黃), Chinese surname with several Vietnamese variants
- Hwang (surname) (黃), (皇), a common Korean family name

== Other uses ==
- Huang (jade), a jade arc-shaped artifact that was used as a pendant
- Fenghuang, mythological birds of East Asia
- Huang, a character in the anime cartoon Darker than Black
- Hwang Seong-gyeong, a character in the Soulcalibur video game series
- Huang (Coca-Cola), a brand of Coca-Cola
- Huang Harmonicas, a Chinese-based manufacturer of harmonicas, founded by noted harmonicist Cham-ber Huang
- The 201st radical (⿈/⻩) of the Kangxi Dictionary
