= Ge Rong =

Northern Wei rebel (died 528)

Ge Rong (simplified Chinese: 葛荣; traditional Chinese: 葛榮; pinyin: Gé Róng; died 528) was a Xianbei rebel of the Northern Wei during the Northern and Southern Dynasties period. Initially a commander for one of the Six Garrisons, he later became the leader of a rebellion in Hebei and declared himself the Emperor of Qi. Among the rebel groups during the final years of the Northern Wei, Ge Rong commanded the largest and brought the uprising in Hebei to its peak intensity. However, he was soon defeated by an elite force under Erzhu Rong at the Battle of Fukou, where he was captured and subsequently sent to Luoyang for execution.

== Background ==
Ge Rong was initially a commander of Huaishuo town (懷朔鎮; northeast of Guyang County, Inner Mongolia), one of the Six Garrisons of the Northern Wei. Following the failure of Poliuhan Baling's uprising in 525, the Northern Wei court ordered for the 200,000 rebels that surrendered to be scattered throughout the provinces of Ding, Ji and Ying to scour for food. Soon, rebellions began to break out in the Hebei region, and in 526, Ge Rong joined the rebel leader in Ding, Xianyu Xiuli.

== Leading the rebellion ==
=== Emperor of Qi ===
In August or September, Xianyu was killed by his one of his generals, Yuan Hongye (元洪業), who planned on surrendering back to Wei. In turn, Ge Rong assassinated Yuan and assumed leadership over the rebels. He then secured an alliance with Du Luozhou, leader of the rebel forces in Shanggu, before marching north towards Ying province while the Prince of Guangyang, Yuan Yuan led troops from Jiaojin (交津) to pursue him. The following month, Ge Rong arrvived at Bainiuluo (白牛邏; in present-day Li County, Hebei) and led his light cavalry to launch a surprise attack on the Prince of Zhangwuzhang, Yuan Rong, killing him. Afterwards, Ge Rong proclaimed himself the Emperor of Qi (齊) and proclaimed the new reign era of Guang'an (廣安). He also began handing out titles to his own followers, most notably Yuwen Luosheng (the brother of Yuwen Tai) who he enfeoffed the Prince of Yuyang.

Upon hearing of Yuan Rong's defeat, Yuan Yuan stopped his pursuit and went to Ding province. However, the provincial inspector, Yang Jin (楊津) did not trust him and sent troops to attack him. Yuan and his followers took a small path to the border of Boling (博陵, in modern Hengshui, Hebei), where they encountered Ge Rong's cavalrymen and were captured. Many of the rebels respected Yuan Yuan, but Ge Rong, who just recently declared himself emperor, had the prince executed out of fear that he would pose a threat to his power.

=== Conquest of Ji province ===
In January or February 527, Ge Rong invaded and captured Yin province (殷州, roughly modern Xingtai, Hebei), killing the local inspector Cui Kai (崔楷) before attacking Ji province. In March or April, he besieged the provincial capital, Xindu for many months while the Wei court dispatched the Household Counsellor with Golden Tassel, Yuan Ziyong to relieve the city. However, Yuan Ziyong's forces were later diverted to Xiang province (相州, centered around modern-day Anyang, Henan), as the Prince of Anle, Yuan Jian (元鑑) had rebelled at the city of Ye. By November, the food supply in Xindu was depleted, and the city soon fell to Ge Rong. The residents of Xindu were forcibly evicted from the city by Ge, and many of them froze to death.

Ge Rong also captured Yuan Fu (元孚) and his brother, Yuan You (元祐), who commanded the defence. He brought them before his soldiers and held a trial to determine their fates. Yuan Fu and Yuan You each claimed sole responsibility and offered their lives to the save the other. The Chief Controller, Pan Shao (潘紹) and hundreds of others also kowtowed and pleaded that they were willing to die to save Yuan Fu. In the end, Ge Rong declared, "These are the loyal ministers and righteous people of Wei!" before pardoning Yuan Fu and the rest of the prisoners.

After Yuan Ziyong pacified Ye, he was appointed the new Inspector of Ji province and was once again ordered to march against Ge Rong together with the Grand Chief Controller of the Northern Circuits, Pei Yan (裴衍). In December, they arrived at the Zhang river bend, where Ge Rong led 100,000 soldiers to attack them. Yuan, Pei and the others were all killed in battle, and the province of Xiang was thrown into shock. Ge Rong capitalized on his victory by invading Xiang, but he encountered stiff resistance from the provincial inspector, Li Shen (李神).

=== Battle of Fukou and death ===
In February or March 528, Ge Rong broke his alliance with Du Luozhou by attacking and killing him before absorbing his forces. He then conquered Cang province, where he slaughtered many of the local populace and captured the provincial inspector, Xue Qingzhi. In June or July, Ge's army was suffering from food shortage, so he sent his subordinate, Ren Bao (任褒) with an army to the south, reaching Qinshui County. The Wei court commissioned Yuan Tianmu and others to campaign against Ge Rong, who retreated north of Xiang province when he heard that they were approaching.

In August or September, Ge Rong led his troops towards Ye to besiege the city. The Book of Wei claims, albeit likely exaggerated, that he had a "force of a million" under his command. Ge Rong and his men plundered and looted along the way before passing through Ji Commandery (汲郡; around present-day Weihui, Henan). The paramount general of Wei, Erzhu Rong, personally brought 7,000 elite cavalry out from Jinyang to face him at Fukou (滏口; northwest of present-day Ci County, Hebei), with his general Hou Jing leading the vanguard. Ge Rong was delighted when he heard about the size of the enemy force, telling his men "This will be an easy task. Everyone prepare the long ropes and tie them up once they get here." He then advanced with his troops lined up for several miles in a dispersed formation. However, as Ge Rong's force passed through a valley, they were suddenly ambushed by Erzhu Rong's cavalry. Erzhu's men maintained strict discipline while causing pandemonium among Ge Rong's already disorganized force. Despite his numerical superiority, Ge Rong was unable to withstand the assault, and he was captured by Erzhu at the front lines, prompting his soldiers to surrender.

Ge Rong was sent to the Wei capital, Luoyang in a prison cart escorted by Erzhu's men. Emperor Xiaozhuang of Wei personally went up to the Changhe Gate (閶闔門) to spectate, and Ge kowtowed to him and apologized for his crimes. Subsequently, he was beheaded in the city. His remaining followers were absorbed by Erzhu, but one of his subordinates, Han Lou occupied Jicheng and continued to resist the Wei before he was defeated and killed in 529.

== Sources ==
- Book of Northern Qi
- Book of Zhou
- Book of Liang
- History of the Northern Dynasties
- Zizhi Tongjian
