= Zhengping =

Zhengping (正平) was a Chinese era name used by several emperors of China. It may refer to:

- Zhengping (451–452), era name used by Emperor Taiwu of Northern Wei
- Zhengping (548–549), era name used by Xiao Zhengde
