= Wang Wei (Liang dynasty) =

Chinese Liang dynasty rebel (died 552)

Wang Wei (Chinese: 王偉; pinyin: Wáng Wěi, died 25 June 552) was the chief strategist for Hou Jing, who controlled the imperial government of and briefly took over the throne of the Chinese Liang Dynasty and established his short-lived state of Han. Wang Wei advised Hou Jing during the latter's time as general and was elevated to prime minister during Hou's time in power. Although Wang Wei was successful as an adviser and strategist, he was captured and executed by Hou Jing's enemy, Xiao Yi after Hou's defeat and retreat east.

== As Hou Jing's chief strategist ==
Wang was from Yingchuan Commandery (潁川, roughly modern Xuchang, Henan). His ancestors were from Lüeyang Commandery (略陽, roughly modern Tianshui, Gansu), but as his father Wang Lüe (王略) served as the county magistrate of Xuchang County (許昌, Yingchuan Commandery's seat), the family remained in Yingchuan. Wang himself was known for his knowledge of the I Ching and for his beautiful writing style, and he served as a secretary under Hou Jing while Hou was put in charge of the provinces south of the Yellow River by the paramount general of Eastern Wei, Gao Huan.

In 547, after Gao Huan died, Hou, who was a friend of Gao Huan's but had a running dispute with Gao Huan's son and heir Gao Cheng, rebelled against Eastern Wei. Wang Wei became one of Hou's chief strategists and propagandists. When Gao Cheng read the declarations that Wang wrote on Hou's behalf, he was very impressed, and commented that his staff members should have been aware of Wang's talent and recruited him. Hou subsequently surrendered the provinces he controlled to Liang, but both he and the Liang force commanded by Emperor Wu of Liang's nephew Xiao Yuanming were defeated by the Eastern Wei general Murong Shaozong. Xiao Yuanming was captured, and Hou lost the provinces he controlled and was forced to flee to Liang. Emperor Wu allowed Hou to control the important border city of Shouyang.

In summer of 548, believing that Emperor Wu was ready to betray him so that Xiao Yuanming would be returned, Hou rebelled against Liang after being encouraged by Wang – who pointed out that whether he rebelled or not, he faced death. Subsequently, with Wang's advice, Hou surprised Emperor Wu – who had sent his son, Xiao Guan (蕭綸) the Prince of Shaoling to attack Hou – by leaving Shouyang before Xiao Guan could approach and attacked the capital Jiankang directly. Hou was able to reach Jiankang with minimal resistance, and after capturing the outer city, put the palace under siege. Throughout the siege, Wang continued to serve as chief advisor and propagandist as well as negotiator with Emperor Wu and his crown prince Xiao Gang. It was at Wang's advice that Hou, in 549, promised peace to Emperor Wu and Xiao Gang while obtaining additional food supplies, and the resumed the siege once he obtained the additional food. In spring 549, the palace fell, and Hou took control of Emperor Wu and Xiao Gang. Wang often served as the liaison between Hou and Emperor Wu and Xiao Gang. In summer 549, when Emperor Wu died, it was Wang who escorted Xiao Gang to the palace under Hou's orders, for Xiao Gang to succeed Emperor Wu (as Emperor Jianwen).

During Emperor Jianwen's reign, Hou was actually in control, although most Liang provincial governors refused to follow Hou's orders (issued as imperial edicts by Emperor Jianwen). When Hou was away from the capital to attack those provincial governors, Wang stayed in Jiankang to defend the capital. In 550, when Hou was away on one such campaign, Emperor Wu's grandson Xiao Huili (蕭會理) the Prince of Nankang tried to start a coup at Jiankang to kill Wang, but Wang discovered his plot and put him and his coconspirators to death. While Wang could not prove that Emperor Jianwen was involved, both he and Hou became more suspicious of Emperor Jianwen, notwithstanding that Hou had married Emperor Jianwen's daughter Princess Liyang. Nevertheless, Hou continued to favor Princess Liyang greatly, and Wang, feeling that he was spending too much time with her and not enough time on important matters of state, advised him to spend less time with her. However, this brought Wang into conflict with the princess, and she argued with him. Fearing that Hou would turn against him at the princess' urging, Wang instead advised Hou to get rid of the emperor.

== As Hou Jing's prime minister ==
Hou did not act against Emperor Jianwen immediately, but in autumn 551, after his campaign against Emperor Jianwen's brother Xiao Yi the Prince of Xiangdong – then the strongest remaining Liang prince – ended in disaster, he feared for his safety and wanted to seize the throne immediately. Wang persuaded him that before doing so, he needed to demonstrate his power by deposing the emperor. Hou therefore did so, replacing Emperor Jianwen with his grandnephew Xiao Dong, the Prince of Yuzhang. One and a half months later, at Wang's urging, Hou sent Wang to kill Emperor Jianwen. Wang carried it out by first feasting with Emperor Jianwen (who had already known his intent), and then, after Emperor Jianwen became drunk, suffocating him. A month later, Hou forced Xiao Dong to yield the throne to him, establishing a state of Han. Wang was made the prime minister, and it was at his urging that Hou built temples to worship his ancestors, pursuant to Confucian tradition. Because Hou did not know his ancestors' names beyond his grandfather's, Wang had to make up names for them. Wang also tried to curb Hou's frivolous behavior, although this made Hou depressed.

== After Hou Jing's defeat ==
In spring 552, after Xiao Yi's generals Wang Sengbian and Chen Baxian reached Jiankang and defeated Hou, Wang Wei advised Hou to defend the palace against a potential siege, but Hou instead abandoned Jiankang and fled east. After Hou fled, Wang Wei fled separately with the generals Hou Zijian (侯子鑒) and Chen Qing (陳慶), trying to get to Guangling (廣陵, in modern Yangzhou, Jiangsu) to join another general, Guo Yuanjian (郭元建). However, on the way, Wang Wei became lost and separated from Hou Zijian. He was instead captured by the army commander Huang Gongxi (黃公喜) and delivered to Jiankang. Wang Sengbian rebuked him for fleeing and not dying for his emperor, and Wang, alluding to an incident where Hou had allowed Wang Sengbian to flee, instead responded, "Success and failure had already been determined by heaven. If Hou had accepted my suggestion to detain you, how would you have this success?" Wang Sengbian laughed and was impressed with Wang Wei's fortitude in his response, and only imprisoned him, awaiting instructions from Xiao Yi on what to do. While imprisoned, Wang Wei wrote poems to Xiao Yi's associates and Xiao Yi himself, hoping that his talent could impress them enough to spare him. Xiao Yi was initially inclined to spare him, but Wang Wei's enemies instead told Xiao Yi to read one of the propaganda pieces that Wang Wei had written for Hou. Xiao Yi, who was blind in one eye and sensitive about his blind eye, read:

Xiang Yu had two pupils in one eye, and he was nevertheless defeated at the Wu River. The Prince of Xiangdong is already blind in one eye; how can the people follow him?

Insulted, Xiao Yi ordered that Wang Wei be put to death in a cruel manner. It was said that as he was being executed, Wang's countenance did not change.

== Notes and references ==
=== Bibliography ===
- Book of Liang, vol. 56.
- History of Southern Dynasties, vol. 80.
- Zizhi Tongjian, vols. 159, 160, 161, 162, 163, 164.
