= Empress Mu =

Empress Mu may refer to:

== People with the surname Mu ==
- Mu Sheli (fl. 570–577), wife of the Northern Qi emperor Gao Wei

== People with this posthumous name ==
- Empress Wu (Zhaolie) (died 245), posthumously known as Empress Mu, wife of the Shu Han emperor Liu Bei
- Empress Yang (Lü Zuan's wife) (died 401), posthumously known as Empress Mu, wife of the Later Liang emperor Lü Zuan
- Ding Lingguang (484–526), posthumously known as Empress Dowager Mu, mother of the Liang dynasty emperor Xiao Gang
