= Empress Dowager Ding =

Empress Dowager Ding may refer to:

- Empress Dowager Ding (Han dynasty) (died 5 BC), empress dowager of the Han dynasty, Emperor Ai of Han's mother
- Empress Xianyou (died 402), empress dowager of the Later Yan dynasty, mother of Murong Sheng (Emperor Zhaowu)

== See also ==
- Ding Lingguang (484–526), posthumous name Empress Dowager Mu, mother of Xiao Gang (Emperor Jianwen of Liang)
