= Princess Liyang =

Liang dynasty princess and wife of Hou Jing

Princess Liyang 溧陽公主
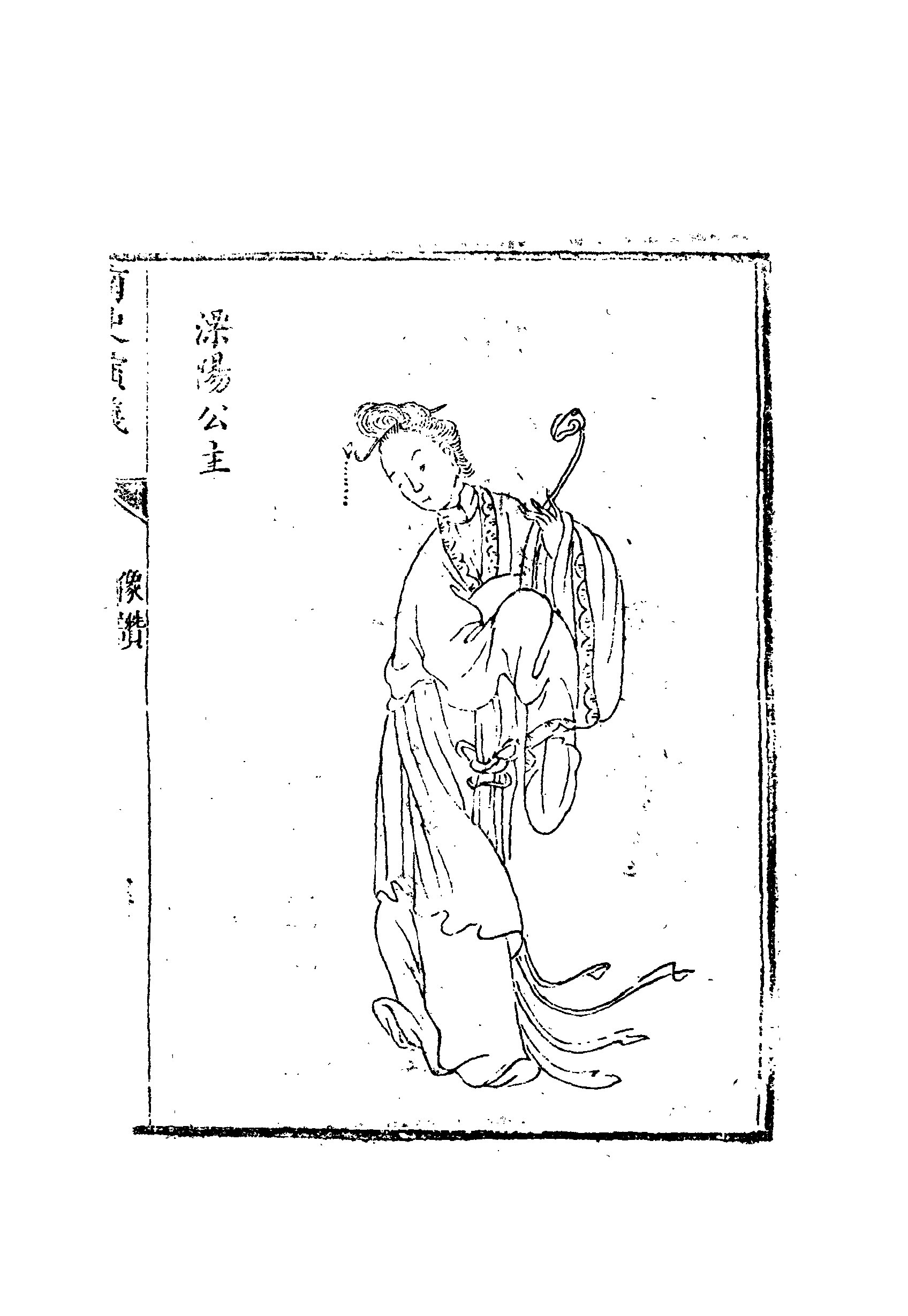
- Born: 536; Nanjing, Jiangsu
- Died: Unknown
- Spouse: Hou Jing
- Father: Emperor Jianwen of Liang

Princess Liyang (536–?) was a princess of the Liang dynasty and a wife of the rebel general, Hou Jing during the Northern and Southern dynasties period. After Hou Jing seized control of the Liang government in Jiankang, she was married to him by her father, Emperor Jianwen of Liang at the age of 14. Traditional accounts tell of her beauty and Hou Jing's infatuation for her. After Hou Jing was killed in 552, she along with the people of Jiankang partook in consuming his flesh.

== Life ==
Princess Liyang was born in 536 as the daughter of Xiao Gang and the granddaughter of Emperor Wu of Liang. During the Hou Jing Disturbance in 549, her grandfather was starved to death while his father was installed to the throne as a puppet by the rebel general, Hou Jing. In 550, Xiao Gang, posthumously known as Emperor Jianwen, married the 14-year-old Princess Liyang to Hou Jing, who loved her deeply. Shortly after their marriage, Hou Jing held a three-day feast for Emperor Jianwen where Hou Jing and the princess sat on the imperial bed facing south while traditional Liang music were played.

Hou Jing was captivated by Princess Liyang's beauty. His chief advisor, Wang Wei was concerned that their relationship was interfering with government affairs and warned Hou Jing about the dangers. However, Hou Jing reported his words to the princess, who then began speaking ill of Wang Wei. The dispute between Wang Wei and the princess soon pressured Wang to persuade Hou Jing into deposing and murdering Emperor Jianwen in 551. The emperor's grandnephew, Xiao Dong, was then installed, but in 552, he was also deposed as Hou Jing proclaimed himself the Emperor of Han.

Not long after his ascension, Hou Jing was defeated and killed while attempting to escape. The Liang general, Wang Sengbian had his corpse salted and chopped up, sending his body to Jiankang to be displayed in the streets for the public. The people of Jiankang, including Princess Liyang, divided his flesh and consumed it. His bones were then burnt, and some in attendance had his ashes mixed with wine before drinking it.

== See also ==
- Book of Liang
- History of the Southern Dynasties
- Zizhi Tongjian
