= Xiao Wenshou =

Liu Song empress dowager (343-423)

- Born: 343
- Died: 7 March 423 (aged 80)
- Spouse: Liu Qiao (Emperor Xiao)
- Issue: Liu Daolian, Prince Jing of Changsha; Liu Daogui, Prince Liewu of Linyuan
Posthumous name
- Empress Xiaoyi 孝懿皇后
- Father: Xiao Zhuo (蕭卓)

Xiao Wenshou (蕭文壽) (343 – 7 March 423), formally Empress Xiaoyi (孝懿皇后, literally "the filial and benevolent empress") was an empress dowager of the Chinese Liu Song dynasty. She was the stepmother of the founding emperor, Emperor Wu (Liu Yu).

Xiao Wenshou was a distant cousin of Xiao Daocheng's father and Xiao Shunzhi' father, they were all descendants of Western Han politician Xiao He.

Liu Yu's mother Zhao Anzong (趙安宗) died on the same day that she gave birth to him, in 363. His father Liu Qiao (劉翹) later married Xiao Wenshou, although the date of the marriage is not known. She bore Liu Qiao two sons, Liu Daolian (劉道憐) and Liu Daogui (劉道規). Liu Yu was described to be highly deferential and respectful to her, as she was the only mother he knew. After he overthrew Huan Xuan, who seized the Jin throne in 403, he was created the Duke of Yuzhang, and she was honored as the Duchess Dowager of Yuzhang in 412. After he was created the Prince of Song in 419, she was honored as princess dowager. After he seized the Jin throne and established Liu Song in 420, she was honored as the empress dowager. By this point, Liu Yu was middle aged (57), but he was described as careful and loving to her that he visited her every day without ceasing. After he died and was succeeded by his son Emperor Shao of Song in 422, she was honored as grand empress dowager. She died in 423, and, pursuant to instructions that both she and Emperor Wu left, she was buried at the same site as Liu Qiao but not in the same tomb, as it would be difficult to conduct an imperial burial in the small tomb that Liu Qiao was buried.
