= Xiao Daqi =

Crown prince of the Chinese Liang Dynasty

Xiao Daqi (蕭大器) (10 June 523 – September or October 551), courtesy name Renzong (仁宗), formally Crown Prince Ai (哀太子, literally "the lamentable crown prince"), was a crown prince of the Chinese Liang Dynasty. He was the oldest son of Emperor Jianwen (Xiao Gang).

== Biography ==
=== Early years ===
Xiao Daqi was born in June 523, to Xiao Gang (who was then the Prince of Jin'an) and his wife, Princess Wang Lingbin (王靈賓). Xiao Daqi's uncle Xiao Tong, the first crown prince of his grandfather Emperor Wu, died in 531, and Emperor Wu created Xiao Gang crown prince instead. In 532, as the crown prince's oldest son, Xiao Daqi was created the Prince of Xuancheng. In 548, when the general Hou Jing rebelled and sieged the capital Jiankang, Xiao Daqi was given a general title, but did not appear to actually command troops. In 549, during peace negotiations that Xiao Gang entered with Hou, Hou was demanding that Xiao Daqi be sent to him as a hostage, but that term was never agreed to before peace negotiations collapsed over other issues. Hou subsequently captured the city, taking Emperor Wu, Xiao Gang, and other members of the imperial household, including Xiao Daqi, as hostages. Later that year, when Emperor Wu died, Xiao Gang succeeded to the throne (as Emperor Jianwen), albeit under Hou's control, and Emperor Jianwen created Xiao Daqi crown prince. (Xiao Daqi's mother Princess Wang also died in 549, without having been created empress, so presumably she died before Emperor Wu did.)

Despite Hou's control over the political scene, Xiao Daqi was said to have never humiliated himself before Hou or Hou's associates. When his attendants asked him how he was able to keep his composure, he explained, "If the bandit [Hou] wanted to maintain the leadership, then he would surely not kill me. Even if I were arrogant and yelling at him, he would not rebuke me. If he decided to act, even if I bowed to him 100 times a day, I would not be able to save myself." He further explained, "I expect to die before the bandit dies. If my uncles [Emperor Jianwen's brothers, several of whom were key provincial governors] can destroy the bandit, the bandit will surely kill us before dying himself. If the uncles fail, he will kill me so that he can receive the ultimate glory [i.e., become emperor]. How can I spend a life that will surely die on unproductive worries?"

In spring 551, when Hou advanced west on the Yangtze River to fight Xiao Daqi's uncle Xiao Yi the Prince of Xiangdong, then the strongest of the remaining Liang princes, he carried Xiao Daqi with him as hostage. In summer 551, when Hou was defeated by Xiao Yi's general Wang Sengbian, Hou fled back to Jiankang, and his fleet was in such a disarray at the time that Xiao Daqi had an opportunity to escape to Northern Qi, and Xiao Daqi's attendants largely encouraged him to do so. Xiao Daqi, however, responded, "Since the empire plunged into warfare, I have decided not to live in a humiliating manner. His Imperial Majesty is held by the bandit, and how would I dare to leave him? If I flee, I am rebelling against my father, not the bandit." He therefore continued back to Jiankang.

=== Final Years ===
In fall 551, with Hou believing that he might be nearing defeat, he wanted to take the throne. In order to first show off his power, he deposed Emperor Jianwen and replaced him with Xiao Tong's grandson Xiao Dong the Prince of Yuzhang. Hou executed all of Emperor Jianwen's sons under his control, including Xiao Daqi. When the executioners arrived at Xiao Daqi's residence, he was giving a lecture on the Tao Te Ching. He stated, "I knew long ago that this would happen. Alas, it is happening too late." The executioners initially wanted him to strangle him with his belt, but he responded, "That does not kill," and instead told them to use a rope, which they used to strangle him. In 552, after Xiao Yi declared himself emperor (as Emperor Yuan), he awarded Xiao Daqi his posthumous name.
