= Hou Jing =

Chinese general and emperor (died 552)

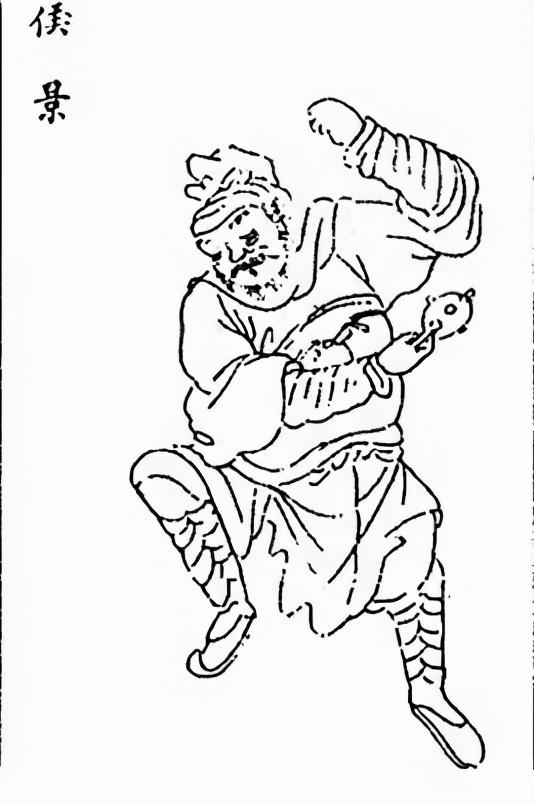

Emperor of the Han Dynasty
- Reign: January 1, 552 – c.May 552
- Predecessor: Xiao Dong
- Successor: Emperor Yuan

Regent of the Liang Dynasty
- Reign: 548 – 31 December 551
- Emperor: Emperor Wu of Liang; Xiao Zhengde; Emperor Jianwen of Liang; Xiao Dong
- Died: c.May 552
Names
- Family name: Hóu (侯); Given name: Jǐng (景)
Era dates
- Tàishǐ (太始)
- House: Hàn (漢)
- Father: Hou Biao (侯標)

Hou Jing (Chinese: 侯景; pinyin: Hóu Jǐng; died c.26 May 552), courtesy name Wanjing (萬景), was a Chinese military general, monarch, and politician. He was a general of Northern Wei, Eastern Wei, and Liang, and briefly, after controlling the Liang imperial regime for several years, usurped the Liang throne, establishing a state of Han. He was soon defeated by the Liang prince Xiao Yi, the prince of Xiangdong, and was killed by his own associates while in flight. The entire period from 548–552 is known as the Hou Jing or Houjing Disturbance (侯景之亂). Hou Jing is one of the most reviled figures in imperial Chinese history, known for his extreme cruelty to enemies and civilians. He is also known to have called himself "Grand General of the Universe, Chief Controller of all Military Affairs in the Six Directions" (宇宙大將軍、都督六合諸軍事).

== Early life and career ==
It is not known when Hou Jing was born, but it was known that he was from Huaishuo Garrison (懷朔鎮) -- one of the Six Garrisons that Northern Wei established on the northern border to defend against Rouran attacks. He appeared to be ethnically Chinese, but the matter of his ethnicity is not conclusive. He is sometimes called a "Jie" (羯; literally meaning wether) by his enemies in historical texts, which have led many modern scholars to conclude that he came from the Jie people. However, few historians have pointed out that the word "Jie" was a common derogatory term at the time, and did not necessarily relate to the ethnic Jie. Furthermore, he and his family likely underwent some degree of Xianbeification while living among the Six Garrisons, where Xianbei culture was prevalent. When Hou Jing was young, he was one of a group of friends who associated with Gao Huan, who often spent time in the countryside, seeking to correct injustice.

During the reign of Emperor Xiaoming, Northern Wei plunged into a state of civil war, with much of the state overrun by agrarian rebellions. Around this time, Hou joined the army of the Northern Wei general Erzhu Rong, and initially, he learned tactics from Erzhu's lieutenant Murong Shaozong, but soon, Murong found it necessary to consult Hou for his opinion on tactical matters. After Erzhu largely put down the rebellions, Hou was made the governor of Ding Province (定州, roughly modern Baoding, Hebei). After Erzhu was killed by Emperor Xiaozhuang in 530, and Emperor Xiaozhuang was in turn killed by Erzhu's relatives, members of the Erzhu clan controlled the imperial government. In 531, Gao rose against the Erzhus, and in 532, after Gao had defeated the Erzhus, Hou joined Gao, and Gao made him the governor of Ji Province (濟州, roughly modern Liaocheng, Shandong). Soon, however, Gao appeared to recall Hou and make him one of his subcommanders. In 534, when Gao instigated Houmochen Yue, the lieutenant of the independent general Heba Yue, to assassinate Heba, he sent Hou to try to seize Heba's troops, but on the way, Hou encountered Heba's assistant Yuwen Tai, who sternly warned him against trying, and Hou retreated, allowing Yuwen to take control of Heba's troops. This allowed Yuwen to take control of the western provinces of the state, and in 534, Emperor Xiaowu, whom Gao had made emperor in 532, seeking to slip out of Gao's control, fled to Yuwen's territory. Gao made Yuan Shanjian, a member of the imperial Yuan clan, emperor, thus dividing Northern Wei into Eastern Wei (under Gao's control) and Western Wei (under Yuwen's control).

== As Eastern Wei general ==
Hou Jing continued to serve under Gao Huan, and he became known as a brilliant tactician as well as a tough warrior even though, unlike many other generals at the time, he was not particularly skilled at horseriding, archery, or any other martial skills, and he was described as walking with a limp with short legs. Gao, however, knew of his abilities and honoured him appropriately. But Hou was arrogant, and he often compared two other key generals, Peng Le and Gao Aocao, to wild boars in their charges. He also often claimed that if Gao allowed him to lead an army south, he could easily capture Emperor Wu of Liang and make Emperor Wu, an avid Buddhist, the head monk of the Taiping Temple (太平寺).

In late 534, Gao sent Hou to attack Heba Sheng (Heba Yue's brother), who controlled the southern provinces at the time and was loosely allied with Yuwen Tai. Hou defeated Heba, forcing Heba to flee to the Liang Dynasty and taking those provinces for Eastern Wei. In 536, Gao put him in charge of the provinces south of the Yellow River, and from that point on, those provinces were under his command. In the winter of that year, he was sent to raid Chuzhou (楚州). He had some initial success, killing its inspector (刺史) Huan He (桓和) on c.9 December, and even wrote a letter to famed Liang general Chen Qingzhi, asking Chen to surrender. But, Hou was later defeated by Chen, and Chen's troops recovered the supplies which Hou's troops had abandoned during their retreat.

In 537, when Gao launched a major attack on Western Wei, seeking to destroy it, Hou was with him, and advised against advancing in a single large army, advocating dividing the army into two parts that would remain at a distance and support each other. Gao did not accept his advice, and was defeated by Yuwen Tai at the Battle of Shayuan (沙苑, in modern Weinan, Shaanxi), suffering heavy losses — partly because Hou gave the poor tactical advice that Gao should not try to set fires against Yuwen's troops. After the defeat, Hou offered to take the elite troops to launch a surprise attack on Yuwen, arguing that Yuwen would not be taking any precautions against such an attack and could be captured. However, when Gao consulted with his wife Lou Zhaojun, Princess Lou reminded him that if Hou actually captured Yuwen, he would not return (i.e., he would then try to take power himself). Gao therefore decided against Hou's plan.

In 538, Hou recaptured several southern provinces that had defected to Western Wei in light of Eastern Wei's defeat at Shawan. He followed up by besieging the old Northern Wei capital, Luoyang, then defended by the Western Wei general Dugu Xin, precipitating a major battle in which both Eastern and Western Wei suffered major losses. In the end, however, the Western Wei troops, commanded by Yuwen, were forced to withdraw, and the Luoyang region was again controlled by Eastern Wei.

In 543, when the Eastern Wei general Gao Zhongmi (高仲密) defected to Western Wei, along with the important garrison of Hulao (虎牢, in modern Zhengzhou, Henan), which he controlled, Hou was one of the generals who helped both in besieging Hulao and in combating the Western Wei forces commanded by Yuwen that tried to relieve Hulao. The Western Wei forces were defeated and forced to withdraw, but even then Hulao did not fall. Yuwen then sent secret messengers to order Hulao's defender Wei Guang (魏光) to hold his position and to await relief forces. Hou captured the messengers and, judging that it was more important to capture the garrison quickly, changed the messengers' message to "Withdraw from Hulao," and then allowed the messengers to reach Wei Guang. Wei Guang quickly withdrew from Hulao, which became again under Eastern Wei control. For this achievement, Hou was promoted to the honorific post of Sikong (司空).

== Rebellion against Eastern Wei ==
Despite the strong personal relationship between Gao Huan and Hou Jing, however, Hou had little respect for Gao's oldest son and heir apparent Gao Cheng, once making the comment to another friend of his and Gao Huan's, Sima Ziru (司馬子如), that he would remain loyal if Gao Huan were still alive, but that he could not serve together with the "Xianbei boy" (i.e., Gao Cheng) if Gao Huan died. (Gao Huan was ethnically Han, but was acculturated in the Xianbei ways.) In late 546, believing that Gao Huan was dead or near death, Hou began to prepare to rebel, and he did so in spring 547. He first surrendered the 13 provinces that he commanded to Western Wei, but subsequently also surrendered to Liang. Both Western Wei and Liang sent troops to support him. Before Western Wei and Liang troops could arrive, Eastern Wei forces commanded by Han Gui (韓軌) surrounded him at Yingchuan (潁川, in modern Xuchang, Henan). Western Wei forces commanded by Wang Sizheng soon arrived, and Han withdrew. Wang, not believing that Hou actually intended to become a loyal Western Wei subject, secured four provinces that Hou was willing to give up control. Meanwhile, Emperor Wu of Liang was greatly pleased by Hou's surrender, and launched a major attack commanded by his nephew Xiao Yuanming the Marquess of Zhenyang, intending to relieve the pressure on Hou by opening another front to the east. Soon, Yuwen Tai demanded that Hou visit the Western Wei capital Chang'an to pay homage to Emperor Wen of Western Wei, to show his good faith. Hou refused, and he tried to persuade a number of Western Wei generals to join him, but only Ren Yue (任約) did, with a minor army. The rest of the Western Wei forces withdrew their support from Hou and merely defended the provinces that Hou had given up.

Meanwhile, Gao Cheng, pursuant to directions left him by Gao Huan, commissioned Murong Shaozong as the commander of his forces against Hou—a move that caught Hou by surprise, as he was still apprehensive of Murong's abilities and was surprised that Gao Cheng would make Murong his commanding general. At the same time, Xiao Yuanming arrived at Hanshan (含山), near the important city of Pengcheng (彭城, in modern Xuzhou, Jiangsu), putting pressure on the city by damming the Si River (泗水) to cause it to flood against Pengcheng. However, against the advice of the senior general Yang Kan, Xiao Yuanming did not quickly siege Pengcheng, but merely waited, pondering his next move. Hou cautioned him against Murong, and also informed him that if he defeated Eastern Wei troops, he should not chase them too hastily, lest he fall into a trap. He did not heed the warning, and when Murong arrived at Pengcheng, Murong attacked him. The Liang troops were initially successful and quickly forced Eastern Wei forces to retreat, but Murong, anticipating this result, laid a trap, and when Liang troops gave chase, they became trapped and were crushed. Xiao Yuanming was captured.

Having defeated Xiao Yuanming, Murong now turned his attention toward Hou, and he marched toward Chengfu (城父, in modern Bozhou, Anhui), where Hou was. Hou retreated to Woyang (渦陽, in modern Bozhou as well), and the armies faced off against each other. Initially, Hou was successful, forcing Murong's army to flee, but Murong soon regrouped, and the armies' positions stalemated. By the end of 547, Hou's army had run out of food supplies, and one of the generals who first supported him, Sima Shiyun (司馬世雲), surrendered to Murong. In spring 548, Murong made a public announcement to Hou's troops that their families were still safe (Hou had informed them that their families had been slaughtered by Gao Cheng), and Hou's troops, believing Murong, abandoned him. Hou fled with 800 soldiers who were still loyal to him. Murong gave chase but gave up the chase when Hou reminded him that he himself would be useless if Hou were destroyed. The Liang general Yang Yaren (羊鴉仁), who was holding Xuanhu (懸瓠, in modern Zhumadian, Henan), abandoned Xuanhu. The provinces that Hou controlled were now all lost.

Hou himself considered what his next action would be, and he, under advice from the Liang commander Liu Shenmao (劉神茂), ambushed and seized the Liang acting governor of Southern Yu Province (南豫州, modern central Anhui), Wei An (韋黯), taking control of Southern Yu Province's capital city Shouyang (壽陽, in modern Lu'an, Anhui). He sent an apology to Emperor Wu of Liang, and Emperor Wu, not having the heart to rebuke Hou after his defeat, made him the governor of Southern Yu Province without any punishment.

== Rebellion against Liang Dynasty ==
Meanwhile, Gao Cheng started peace negotiations with Emperor Wu, offering to return Xiao Yuanming and intending to cause Hou to become apprehensive. Hou Jing opposed peace with Eastern Wei, worried that he would be betrayed if there was peace between the two states. Emperor Wu made a personal guarantee that he would not betray Hou—but Hou then tested Emperor Wu by forging a letter from Gao Cheng, proposing an exchange of Xiao Yuanming for Hou. When Emperor Wu, under advice from Zhu Yi—a key assistant to Emperor Wu whom Hou had bribed, hoping that he would discourage peace talks, but whose opinion was unchanged by Hou's bribes—wrote back, "If you return Xiao Yuanming in the morning, I will deliver Hou Jing in the evening," Hou was incensed. He wrote a harshly worded accusation to Emperor Wu, who responded with meek words that failed to persuade Hou against a rebellion. Meanwhile, Hou entered into secret negotiations with Emperor Wu's nephew and adopted son Xiao Zhengde, the Prince of Linhe, offering to make the ambitious Xiao Zhangde emperor, and Xiao Zhengde agreed to assist him. At the same time, despite warnings from Yang Yaren (whom Hou had tried to persuade to join in his plans) and Xiao Fan (蕭範) the Prince of Poyang, Emperor Wu failed to take precautions against a Hou rebellion.

Hou declared a rebellion in summer 548, declaring that his intentions were to have the corrupt officials Zhu Yi, Xu Lin (徐麟), Lu Yan (陸驗), and Zhou Shizhen (周石珍) put to death. Emperor Wu commissioned his son Xiao Guan (蕭綸) the Prince of Shaoling to lead a four-pronged attack on Shouyang, believing that he could put out Hou's rebellion quickly. Meanwhile, Hou, with advice from his strategist Wang Wei, decided he should not wait for Xiao Guan to close in; instead, he made a speedy march toward the capital Jiankang, surprising Emperor Wu. In winter 548, he arrived at Jiankang and immediately put the capital under siege, quickly capturing the outer city with Xiao Zhengde's help and forcing the imperial troops to withdraw into the palace to defend it. However, with Yang Kan defending the palace, Hou could not quickly capture it. Soon, he declared Xiao Zhengde emperor and married Xiao Zhengde's daughter. Meanwhile, as the siege went on, Hou began to become cruel to the civilian population, permitting his army to pillage food from the people and causing large-scale starvation among the civilians. He further forced the civilians to conduct siege construction against the palace. His general Fan Taobang (范桃棒) secretly offered to defect to Liang, but Emperor Wu's crown prince Xiao Gang distrusted Fan and did not take up his offer; soon, Fan's correspondence was discovered, and Hou put him to death. Meanwhile, Yang Kan died, and Hou put even greater pressure on the palace defence.

Around the new year 549, Xiao Guan's forces returned to Jiankang and tried to lift the siege. However, Hou engaged Xiao Guan and defeated him. Xiao Guan reorganized his troops and waited for reinforcement from the other provincial governors. The reinforcements soon arrived, and the provincial generals supported Liu Zhongli (柳仲禮) as their commander, preparing an assault on Hou's troops to lift the siege. In spring 549, Hou surprised them by attacking them first, killing the general Wei Can (韋粲). Liu engaged Hou, and both sides suffered heavy losses, with both Liu and Hou nearly dying in the battle. From that point on, Liu no longer displayed any interest in attacking Hou.

Hou, with his food supplies dwindling, offered peace to Emperor Wu, who initially refused. However, Xiao Gang persuaded Emperor Wu to negotiate, and peace terms were negotiated where Hou would be allowed to return to Shouyang, and Emperor Wu would allow him to control the provinces west of the Yangtze River. However, Hou soon decided that peace would not be sustainable, and once the ceasefire had lasted sufficiently long for him to obtain additional food supplies, he reneged, accusing Emperor Wu of a number of faults, and putting the palace again under siege. Liu stood by, and the palace fell. Hou took control of Emperor Wu and Xiao Gang, issuing an edict in Emperor Wu's name ordering the provincial forces to disband. They did so, and Hou now had control of the capital region, although the provincial governors largely remained resistant to his orders. Hou deposed Xiao Zhengde back to the rank of Prince of Linhe and used Emperor Wu as token authority.

== Control of Liang emperors ==
After Jiankang fell to Hou Jing, the northeastern provinces, north of the Yangtze River, largely surrendered to Eastern Wei, while the provinces to the east and west, hearing of the cruelty of Hou's troops, largely initially resisted him. Around this time, the key Liang potentates who were still resisting included:

- Xiao Dalian (蕭大連) the Duke of Lincheng (later the Prince of Nan Commandery), Xiao Gang's son, at Kuaiji (present-day Shaoxing, Zhejiang)
- Xiao Daxin (蕭大心) the Duke of Danyang (later the Prince of Xunyang), Xiao Gang's son, at Xunyang (尋陽, in modern Jiujiang, Jiangxi)
- Xiao Fan the Prince of Poyang, at Hefei
- Xiao Guan the Prince of Shaoling, at the time roving without a settlement
- Xiao Yu (蕭譽) the Prince of Hedong, Emperor Wu's first crown prince Xiao Tong's son, at Changsha
- Xiao Cha the Prince of Yueyang, Xiao Tong's son, at Xiangyang
- Xiao Yi the Prince of Xiangdong, Emperor Wu's son, at Jiangling
- Xiao Ji the Prince of Wuling, Emperor Wu's son, at Chengdu
- Xiao Bo (蕭勃) the Marquess of Qujiang, Emperor Wu's cousin Xiao Bing (蕭昞)'s son, at Panyu (番禺, in modern Guangzhou, Guangdong)

Of these Liang potentates, the ones with the most military strength at their disposal were Xiao Yi and Xiao Ji. Xiao Ji, however, appeared content to secure his realm, particularly because Xiao Yi discouraged him from advancing east against Hou. Both Xiao Yi and Xiao Ji began to take on imperial trappings and exercised imperial authorities, although neither claimed the throne at this point. Meanwhile, Xiao Yi, believing that his nephews Xiao Yu and Xiao Cha, who were technically his subordinates but not following his orders, would act against him in a coordinated manner, launched an attack on Xiao Yu. Xiao Cha tried to attack Jiangling to relieve the pressure on his brother, but could not, and Xiao Yi's army, while initially repelled by Xiao Yu, eventually, under the general Wang Sengbian, put Changsha under siege. Unable to lift the siege on Changsha and fearful that he would be Xiao Yi's next target, Xiao Cha surrendered to Western Wei, and Western Wei put Xiangyang under its protection and created Xiao Cha the Prince of Liang, intending to have him contend for Liang's throne. Xiao Yi entered peace with Western Wei, leaving Xiao Cha alone at the moment.

Meanwhile, while Emperor Wu was effectively under arrest, he still resisted Hou's will when it came to personnel decisions and other matters that Hou wanted him to issue edicts on. In response, Hou put Emperor Wu under even greater secure guard, and it was said that Emperor Wu's supplies dwindled. In the summer of 549, Emperor Wu died. (Some historians believe that Hou starved him to death.) Hou allowed Xiao Gang to take the throne (as Emperor Jianwen). Meanwhile, Xiao Zhengde, angry at Hou's betrayal of him, secretly communicated with Xiao Fan, but his letters were intercepted, and Hou put him to death.

Xiao Fan tried to elicit Eastern Wei help against Hou, but even though he gave up Hefei to Eastern Wei, Eastern Wei did not actually launch troops to help him. He was forced to advance west on the Yangtze. With Xiao Daxin's approval, he settled in Xiao Daxin's realm, but soon Xiao Fan and Xiao Daxin began to have disputes over the control of the territory, and Xiao Daxin stopped supplying Xiao Fan's troops. Xiao Fan died in anger and fear. At the same time, Hou was sending his generals Hou Zijian (侯子鑒) and Song Zixian (宋子仙) against Xiao Dalian and the other Liang officials to the east of Jiankang who were still resisting him, and by winter 549, Xiao Dalian and the other officials had fallen, allowing Hou to control most of modern Zhejiang.

In spring 550, Hou married Emperor Jianwen's daughter Princess Liyang, and it was said that he loved her greatly. His relationship with Emperor Jianwen appeared to improve by this point. Due to the wars, the territory under Hou's control suffered from a serious famine, and he ruled with the people with a heavy hand.

In summer 550, Changsha fell to Wang, and Wang put Xiao Yu to death, putting Xiao Yu's domain directly under Xiao Yi's control.

In fall 550, Hou sent Ren Yue to attack both Xiao Daxin and Xiao Fan's son Xiao Si (蕭嗣). Ren killed Xiao Si in battle, and Xiao Daxin, unable to resist, surrendered, allowing Hou to take his domain under control. Meanwhile, Xiao Guan, who had by now settled at Jiangxia (江夏, in modern Wuhan, Hubei), was planning to attack Hou, but this drew Xiao Yi's ire—believing that Xiao Guan was intending to contend for the throne—and he sent Wang to attack Xiao Guan. Xiao Guan, not willing to engage Wang, abandoned Jiangxia and fled to Ru'nan (汝南, in modern Jingmen, Hubei), where he entered into an alliance with Eastern Wei's successor state Northern Qi (with Gao Cheng's brother Gao Yang having seized the throne in summer 550) and was created the Prince of Liang as well.

Later that year, Hou made Emperor Jianwen create him the Prince of Han. Additionally, Hou made Emperor Jianwen promote him to the position of "Grand General of the Universe, Commander of all Military Affairs in the Six Directions" (宇宙大將軍、都督六合諸軍事). Emperor Jianwen was surprised and remarked, "How can a general's command be of the universe?"

Meanwhile, Ren continued to advance west, intending to attack Xiao Yi, but was repelled by Xiao Yi's general Xu Wensheng (徐文盛). Hou personally led troops to aid Ren, leaving Wang Wei in charge of Jiankang. While Hou was away from Jiankang, Emperor Wu's grandson Xiao Huili (蕭會理) the Prince of Nankang organized a plot to overthrow Wang Wei. The plot was discovered, and Wang Wei put Xiao Huili and his confederates to death. Wang Wei could not show that Emperor Jianwen was involved, but both Hou and Wang Wei became increasingly suspicious of Emperor Jianwen from this point on, and very few officials dared to visit the emperor.

In spring 551, Western Wei put Ru'nan under siege, and after capturing it, put Xiao Guan to death. Meanwhile, Xu counterattacked against Ren, and Hou again led troops to reinforce Ren, this time carrying Emperor Jianwen's crown prince Xiao Daqi as hostage. Xu initially had success against Hou, but in summer 551, Hou surprised Xu by bypassing him and making a surprise attack on Jiangxia, capturing it and seizing the general Bao Quan (鮑泉) and Xiao Yi's son Xiao Fangzhu (蕭方諸), eventually putting them to death in cruel manners. Xu's forces collapsed. Xu was forced to regroup at Baling (巴陵, in modern Yueyang, Hunan), and Wang Sengbian took over command of Xiao Yi's forces there. Hou, instead of attacking Xiao Yi's headquarters at Jiangling directly, put Baling under siege but was unable to capture it, and his food supplies began to run low. Soon, he was forced to withdraw, and his forces collapsed. Ren was captured, while Song Zixian and Ding He (丁和), both major generals as well, were killed. Hou fled back to Jiankang, and Xiao Yi retook control of Jiangxia. Soon, with Wang Sengbian aided by another general, Chen Baxian, Xunyang fell to Xiao Yi's forces as well.

Hou began to believe that his days might be numbered, and he wanted to become emperor in his remaining days. Meanwhile, Wang Wei, who believed that Hou was spending too much time with Princess Liyang and ignoring important matters, tried to get him to change his ways, but this drew the princess' ire. Wang Wei, believing that Princess Liyang would eventually persuade Hou to harm him, instead advised Hou to remove Emperor Jianwen to show off his authority. Hou agreed, and in fall 551, he removed Emperor Jianwen and put the sons of Emperor Jianwen under his control, including Xiao Daqi, to death. He made Xiao Tong's grandson Xiao Dong, Prince of Yuzhang, to be emperor. Two months later, he put Xiao Tong to death. Meanwhile, Hou was preparing to take the throne. He had Xiao Dong bestow him the nine bestowments.

== As Emperor of Han ==
In November 551, Hou Jing had Xiao Dong yield the throne to him, and he claimed the title of Emperor of Han and era name Taishi (太始) —a title not recognized by the Liang provinces not under his control, which by this point had begun to view Xiao Yi as the de facto emperor, although Xiao Yi and Xiao Ji still both declined imperial titles by this point.

The first action Hou Jing's troops, commanded by Xie Daren (謝答仁), took was to attack several generals to the east of Jiankang, who had risen against him in the last days of Emperor Jianwen's reign. In winter 551, Xie first captured Yuan Jun (元頵) and Li Zhan (李占), and then in spring 552 captured Liu Shenmao—who had initially given Hou the advice on how to seize Shouyang. Hou put these generals to death in cruel manners—cutting off Yuan and Li's arms and feet and then demonstrating them to the public for more than a day until they died, and he made a rolling pin with sharp swords on it to cut Liu to pieces alive. He also executed Xiao Yi's son Xiao Fangzhu.

Meanwhile, Xiao Yi's forces, commanded by Wang Sengbian and Chen Baxian, continued to advance toward Jiankang, and they quickly arrived in Jiankang's vicinity. Hou Jing initially ordered Hou Zijian, whom he sent against Wang, not to engage Wang and Chen on water, but after Wang pretended to be apprehensive, Hou Jing changed to order and allowed Hou Zijian to engage them on water, and Wang defeated him. Chen quickly set up advanced positions north of the Qinhuai River (秦淮河, just south of Jiankang), and when Hou Jing himself attacked Chen, Chen defeated him as well. Against Wang Wei's advice to defend Jiankang, Hou Jing abandoned it and fled, commenting:

I had defeated Heba Sheng and Ge Rong [a peasant rebel whom Erzhu Rong defeated] and become famous north of the Yellow River. Later, after I crossed the Yangtze River, I easily captured the palace and forced Liu Zhongli to surrender. My defeats today are heaven's will.

Hou put his two young sons, born during the time he was at Jiankang, into saddle bags and drowned them, and then fled east, intending to join Xie's army to the east.

== Death ==
Hou Jing's hopes of joining Xie Daren, however, were dashed when one of Wang Sengbian's subordinate generals, Hou Tian, intercepted him and defeated him again, causing his remaining guard troops to collapse. Hou Jing took his remaining boats and fled on the Yangtze River, throwing his two sons into the water to drown. He ordered that the boats head to Mengshan (蒙山), an island off the modern Shandong coast—apparently intending to return to the north. His guard Yang Kun (羊鵾, son of Yang Kan and brother of one of Hou's concubines), however, had other ideas, and while Hou was asleep, he ordered that the boats turn around and head toward Jingkou (京口, in modern Zhenjiang, Jiangsu), by now again under Liang control. When Hou woke up, he tried to give contrary orders, but Yang killed him with a spear and delivered his body to Jingkou. His body was then stuffed with salt and delivered to Jiankang. Wang Sengbian cut off the head and delivered it to Xiao Yi and cut off the hands and delivered them to Northern Qi. He then displayed the body publicly, and the public, including Emperor Jianwen's daughter and Hou's one-time wife, Princess Liyang, quickly cut off Hou's flesh and consumed it.

== Physical Appearance ==
In his biography in the History of the Southern Dynasties, Hou Jing was described as a man of short stature (shorter than 7 chi) with short legs and a longer upper body, and he had high cheekbones and a wide forehead, his face was reddish with little facial hair, and he had a jackal-like voice.

== Legacy ==
Hou Jing and his rebellion caused great damage to the Liang dynasty; about five years after his death, Liang general Chen Baxian overthrew the Liang dynasty and established his Chen dynasty.

== Family ==
- Father
  - Hou Biao (侯標), posthumously honored as Emperor Yuan
- Wives
  - Name unknown (executed by Gao Cheng 547 or 548)
  - Lady Xiao, daughter of Xiao Zhengde (married 548)
  - The Princess Liyang, daughter of Emperor Jianwen of Liang (married 550)
- Major Concubines
  - Consort Yang, daughter of Liang general Yang Kan
- Children
  - Oldest son, name unknown (executed by Gao Cheng 547 or 548)
  - Four other sons, names unknown (executed by Emperor Wenxuan of Northern Qi during his reign)
  - Two sons, born in Liang territory (killed by Hou Jing himself 552)

Regnal titles
Preceded by Xiao Dong of Liang Dynasty	Emperor of China (Southeastern); 552	Succeeded by Emperor Yuan of Liang
