= Emperor Jianwen of Liang =

2nd emperor of the Liang Dynasty

Emperor Jianwen of Liang 梁簡文帝

Emperor of the Liang Dynasty
- Reign: 7 July 549 – 2 October 551
- Predecessor: Emperor Wu
- Successor: Xiao Dong
- Born: Xiao Liutong (蕭六通); 2 December 503
- Died: 15 November 551 (aged 47)
- Burial: Zhuang Mausoleum (莊陵, in present-day Danyang, Jiangsu)
- Consorts: Empress Jianwenjian (Wang Lingbin; 505 - 16 April 549)
Names
- Family name: Xiāo (蕭); Given name: Gāng (綱)
Era name and dates
- Dàbǎo (大寶): 550-551
Posthumous name
- Emperor Jiǎnwén (簡文皇帝, lit. "The Approachable and Civil Emperor"); Emperor Míng (明皇帝, lit. "The Understanding Emperor")
Temple name
- Tàizōng (太宗); Gāozōng (高宗) (Note: Hou Jing separately gave him the posthumous name of Emperor Ming (明皇帝, lit. "the bright/understanding emperor") with the temple name Gaozong (高宗), but neither was recognized by other Liang potentates or later historians.)
- House: Lanling Xiao
- Father: Emperor Wu
- Mother: Empress Dowager Mu

Emperor Jianwen of Liang (梁簡文帝; 2 December 503 – 551), personal name Xiao Gang (蕭綱), courtesy name Shizuan (世纘), childhood name Liutong (六通), was an emperor of the Chinese Liang Dynasty. He was initially not the crown prince of his father Emperor Wu, the founder of the dynasty, but became the crown prince in August 531 after his older brother Xiao Tong died. In 549, the rebellious general Hou Jing captured the capital Jiankang, and Hou subsequently held both Emperor Wu and Crown Prince Gang under his power, having Crown Prince Gang take the throne (as Emperor Jianwen) after Emperor Wu's death later that year. During Emperor Jianwen's reign, he was almost completely under Hou's control, and in 551, Hou, planning to take the throne himself, first forced Emperor Jianwen to yield the throne to his grandnephew Xiao Dong the Prince of Yuzhang, and then sent messengers to suffocate the former emperor.

== Background ==
Xiao Gang was born in 503, as the third son of Emperor Wu. His mother Consort Ding Lingguang (丁令光) also gave birth to Emperor Wu's firstborn son and crown prince Xiao Tong, and therefore carried a special status within his palace even though she was never empress. In 506, at the age of three, Xiao Gang was made the Prince of Jin'an. As he grew in age, he was given a number of progressively higher offices. In January 527, when Consort Ding died, he resigned those offices to observe a mourning period for her, but Emperor Wu restored him to those offices before the mourning period was over.

Consort Ding's death would bring about a disastrous effect in the relationship between Xiao Gang's father Emperor Wu and Xiao Gang's brother Xiao Tong. Xiao Tong sought out an appropriate place to bury Consort Ding, but while he was doing so, a land owner bribed the eunuch Yu Sanfu (俞三副) into convincing Emperor Wu that that piece of land would bring good fortune for the emperor, and so Emperor Wu bought the land and buried Consort Ding there. However, once Consort Ding was buried, a Taoist monk informed Xiao Tong that he believed that the land would bring ill fortune for Consort Ding's oldest son—Xiao Tong. Xiao Tong therefore allowed the monk to bury a few items intended to dissolve the ill fortune, such as wax ducks, at the position reserved for the oldest son. Later on, when one of Xiao Tong's attendants, Bao Miaozhi (鮑邈之), was squeezed out of Xiao Tong's inner circles by another attendant, Wei Ya (魏雅), he, in resentment, reported to Emperor Wu that Wei had carried out sorcery on Xiao Tong's behalf. When Emperor Wu investigated, waxed ducks were found, and Emperor Wu became surprised and angry, and wanted to investigate further. He only stopped the investigation when he was advised to do so by the prime minister Xu Mian, executing only the Taoist monk who had suggested the burial of wax ducks. Xiao Tong became humiliated in the affair, and was never able to clear himself completely in his father's eyes.

Xiao Tong died in May 531. Under Confucian rules of succession, his oldest son Xiao Huan (蕭歡) the Duke of Huarong was expected to succeed him as crown prince, and Emperor Wu summoned Xiao Huan back to the capital Jiankang in order to do so. However, still resentful over the wax duck affair, he hesitated for weeks without carrying out the creation, and finally did not do so. Instead, against popular opinion, he installed Xiao Gang, his then-surviving oldest son, as crown prince on 5 August 531. Xiao Gang's staff advisor Zhou Hongzheng (周弘正) wrote a memo to Xiao Gang advising him to decline, but Xiao Gang did not do so, although he subsequently avenged Xiao Tong's disgrace by executing Bao Miaozhi.

== As crown prince ==
As crown prince, Xiao Gang was a distinguished poet, as well as patron of the poets Yu Jianwu and Xu Chi (徐摛), as well as Xu Ling, the anthologist of New Songs from the Jade Terrace. The poets Yu Jianwu and Xu Chi's writing style influenced Xiao Gang greatly. It became known as the "Xu-Yu Style" or the "Palace Style", with "palace" referring to the Eastern Palace, the official residence of the heir apparent. Initially, Emperor Wu was displeased about this development, but once Emperor Wu met Xu, he was impressed by Xu's talents.

As Crown Prince and "Assistant Monarch," Xiao Gang carried out much decision-making duties in the imperial administration. As Emperor Wu aged, Xiao Gang's younger brothers Xiao Xu (蕭續) the Prince of Luling, Xiao Guan (蕭綸) the Prince of Shaoling, Xiao Yi the Prince of Xiangdong, and Xiao Ji the Prince of Wuling grew less obedient of his edicts, and effectively exercised imperial powers in their provincial domains. Fearing that his brothers would seize power, Xiao Gang selected elite troops to be the palace guards for the crown prince's palace.

In 547, the Eastern Wei general Hou Jing, in a conflict with the new regent Gao Cheng, surrendered the 13 provinces (the region between the Yellow River and the Huai River) to Liang, seeking aid from Liang. However, both Xiao Gang's cousin Xiao Yuanming the Marquess of Zhenyang, and Hou himself, were defeated by the Eastern Wei general Murong Shaozong. Xiao Yuanming was captured, while Hou fled and, surprising the Liang governor of Southern Yu Province (南豫州, modern central Anhui), Wei An (韋黯), seized the key city Shouyang (壽陽, in modern Lu'an, Anhui), the capital of Southern Yu Province. Instead of punishing Hou, however, Emperor Wu allowed him to serve as the governor of Southern Yu Province. It is unclear whether Xiao Gang was involved in making these decisions, but he was clearly informed about them, as he revealed these decisions to his assistant He Jingrong (何敬容).

Soon, however, Hou, believing that Emperor Wu, who engaged in peace talks with Eastern Wei and appeared to be willing to betray him to exchange for Xiao Yuanming, rebelled in summer 548. Hou's army quickly advanced on Jiankang, assisted by Xiao Gang's cousin Xiao Zhengde the Prince of Linhe, putting Jiankang under siege. Emperor Wu put Xiao Gang in charge of the defenses, but Xiao Gang was unsuccessful in preventing the outer city from falling. The imperial troops were forced to withdraw into the palace. When Hou then claimed that it was the corrupt official Zhu Yi that he wanted to kill, Xiao Gang confirmed that Zhu was indeed corrupt, but advised against executing Zhu in that it would serve nothing in the campaign against Hou. Soon, Hou declared Xiao Zhengde emperor. While provincial troops gathered near Jiankang to try to relieve the besieged palace, those troops, commanded by Liu Zhongli (柳仲禮) and Xiao Guan, were unsuccessful, and ultimately, after Liu was nearly killed in a battle, Liu refused to engage Hou any further, leaving the palace troops to fend for themselves. (Xiao Yi and Xiao Ji, although they each had large numbers of troops in their domains, largely stood and sent only token troops.) In winter 548, Hou's general Fan Taobang (范桃棒) offered to rebel against Hou, and while Emperor Wu was initially in favor of the idea, Xiao Gang spoke against it, and it was not carried out. Soon, Fan was killed by Hou, and an opportunity was lost.

In spring 549, Xiao Gang tried to negotiate peace with Hou, whose troops had by then tired. Hou initially agreed—with the terms being that he would be given the provinces west of the Yangtze River. However, Hou soon reneged on the peace agreement and resumed the siege of the palace. Soon, the palace fell, and Emperor Wu and Xiao Gang were effectively taken as hostages, although Hou continued to formally honor them as emperor and crown prince, despite his earlier agreement with Xiao Zhengde to have them killed. (Hou soon deposed Xiao Zhengde and killed him.) Xiao Gang's attendants all fled, except for Xu Li and Yin Buhai (殷不害). The provincial troops which had come to Jiankang's aid were disbanded, and Hou was now in control of the capital region.

Meanwhile, Emperor Wu, while he was under Hou's control, was unwilling to yield, and he refused to carry out some of the acts that Hou wanted him to. Xiao Gang tried to urge Emperor Wu to follow Hou's requests, but Emperor Wu refused. Hou put Emperor Wu under closer guard, and Emperor Wu, in anger, soon grew ill and died. (Some historians believe that Hou starved Emperor Wu to death.) Hou made him emperor to succeed Emperor Wu (as Emperor Jianwen).

== As emperor ==
Emperor Jianwen was formally recognized by the governors of the provinces not under Hou's control, but they saw his edicts as coerced and not binding on them, and they continued to resist Hou, and yet at the same time fought each other for territorial control and were largely ineffective when Hou attacked them, allowing Hou to seize additional territory. Eastern Wei (and its successor state Northern Qi, established in 550 as Gao Cheng's brother Gao Yang seized the throne from Emperor Xiaojing) largely seized the Liang provinces north of the Yangtze. Emperor Jianwen himself tried to foster a relationship with Hou, to ensure his own safety, and in 550, he married his daughter the Princess Liyang to Hou as Hou's wife. Hou favored the princess greatly, and for the time being, the emperor appeared safe. He created his oldest son Xiao Daqi crown prince. However, Hou still kept the emperor under heavy guard, and only several officials, including his cousin Xiao Zi (蕭諮) the Marquess of Wulin, Wang Ke (王克), and Yin Buhai were allowed to see him. Meanwhile, most of the provincial governors eventually accepted the command of Emperor Jianwen's brother Xiao Yi the Prince of Xiangdong, the governor of Jing Province (荊州, modern western Hubei).

In summer 550, Hou sent his general Ren Yue (任約) to try to conquer the central empire. Ren first defeated and captured Emperor Jianwen's son Xiao Daxin (蕭大心) the Prince of Xunyang and governor of Jiang Province (江州, modern central and northern Jiangxi), and then continued on to try to attack Xiao Yi's territory. When Ren was unable to prevail against Xiao Yi's general Xu Wensheng (徐文盛), and Hou himself commanded a force to aid Ren. In winter 550, while Hou was away from Jiankang, Emperor Jianwen's nephew Xiao Huili (蕭會理) plotted with his brother Xiao Aili (蕭乂理), the general Liu Jingli (柳敬禮), and Emperor Jianwen's cousins Xiao Quan (蕭勸) the Marquess of Xixiang and Xiao Mian (蕭勔) the Marquess of Dongxiang, to start a rebellion at Jiankang and overthrow Hou Jing's lieutenant Wang Wei. The plot was discovered, however, and Xiao Huili and his coconspirators were executed by Wang. While Wang could not show that Emperor Jianwen was involved, Hou and Wang became even more suspicious of Emperor Jianwen thereafter. In fear, Wang Ke and Yin stopped seeing the emperor, but Xiao Zi continued. In response, Hou had Xiao Zi assassinated. Emperor Jianwen believed that eventually he would be killed as well, and he commented as such to Yin.

== Removal and death ==
In summer 551, Hou was again aiding Ren, taking Xiao Daqi with him as hostage. Initially, with Hou backing him, Ren took the important city of Jiangxia (江夏, in modern Wuhan, Hubei), and Hou next approached Xiao Yi's headquarters at Jiangling (江陵, in modern Jingzhou, Hubei). However, Hou's forces then became bogged down while trying to siege Baling (巴陵, in modern Yueyang, Hunan), with Xiao Yi's general Wang Sengbian successfully defending Baling. Soon, Hou's food supplies ran out, and his forces collapsed. Ren was captured, and two other key generals, Song Zixian (宋子仙) and Ding He (丁和) were killed. Hou fled back to Jiankang.

Hou, believing that his days of power might be numbered, wanted to become emperor. Meanwhile, Wang had disputes with Emperor Jianwen's daughter Princess Liyang, and believing that she would eventually harm him, persuaded Hou that he should remove the emperor to show off his power. In fall 551, Hou deposed Emperor Jianwen and demoted him back to the title of Prince of Jin'an, and made Xiao Huan's son Xiao Dong the Prince of Yuzhang emperor. Hou had all of Emperor Jianwen's sons who were under his control, including Xiao Daqi the Crown Prince, executed. (He soon regretted these actions, and considered restoring Emperor Jianwen to the throne and making Xiao Dong crown prince, but Wang persuaded him not to do so.) He put Emperor Jianwen under house arrest.

During the house arrest period, Emperor Jianwen, filled with sadness and fear, wrote several hundred poems—and because he was not given paper to write on, wrote the poems on the walls and screens of his residence. Less than two months after Emperor Jianwen's removal, Wang persuaded Hou that Emperor Jianwen must be killed, and Hou sent Wang, Peng Jun (彭雋), and Wang Xiuzuan (王修纂) to visit Emperor Jianwen one night. Emperor Jianwen, knowing what their intentions were, feasted and drank with them, becoming very intoxicated. Once he fell asleep, they suffocated him, and then placed him in a makeshift casket, storing the casket in a brewery. In 552, after Wang Sengbian captured Jiankang, he had Emperor Jianwen's casket placed in the palace and then buried with imperial honors on 5 June.

== Family ==
- Empress Jianwenjian, of the Wang clan of Langya (簡文簡皇后 琊瑯王氏; 505–549), personal name Lingbin (靈賓)
  - Xiao Daqi, Crown Prince Ai (哀皇太子 蕭大器; 524–551), first son
  - Xiao Dalian, Prince of Nan (南王 蕭大連; 527–551), fifth son
  - Princess Changshan (長山公主), personal name Miaohong (妙纮)
- Furen, of the Zuo clan (夫人 左氏; d. 537)
  - Xiao Dalin, Prince of Nanhai (南海王 蕭大臨; 527–551), fourth son
  - Xiao Dachun, Prince of Anlu (安陸王 蕭大春; 530–551), sixth son
- Furen, of the Xie clan (夫人 謝氏)
  - Xiao Daya, Duke of Liuyang (瀏陽公 蕭大雅; 533–549), 12th son
- Furen, of the Zhang clan (夫人 張氏)
  - Xiao Dazhuang, Prince of Xinxing (新興王 蕭大莊; 534–551), 13th son
- Furen, of the Fan clan (夫人 范氏)
  - Xiao Dawei, Prince of Wuning (武寧王 蕭大威; 539–551), 15th son
- Furen, of the Chen clan (夫人 陳氏; d. 544)
  - Xiao Daxin, Prince of Yi'an (義安王 蕭大昕; 541–551), 18th son
- Furen, of the Zhu clan (夫人 朱氏)
  - Xiao Dazhi, Prince of Suijian (綏建王 蕭大摯; 542–551), 19th son
- Shufei, of the Fan clan (淑妃 范氏)
  - Princess Liyang (溧陽公主; b. 536)
    - Married Hou Jing (503–552) in 549
- Xiurong, of the Chen clan (淑容 陳氏)
  - Xiao Daxin, Prince of Xunyang (潯陽王 蕭大心; 523–551), second son
- Zhaohua, of the Bao clan (昭華 包氏)
  - Xiao Dajun, Prince of Xiyang (西陽王 蕭大鈞; 539–551), 14th son
- Xiuhua, of the Chu clan (修華 褚氏)
  - Xiao Daqiu, Prince of Jianping (建平王 蕭大球; 541–551), 17th son
- Meiren, of the Pan clan (美人 潘氏)
  - Xiao Daxun (蕭大訓; 540–549), 16th son
- Unknown
  - Xiao Dakuan, Prince of Linchuan (臨川王 蕭大款), third son
  - Xiao Dacheng, Prince of Guiyang (桂陽王 蕭大成; b. 531), eighth son
  - Xiao Dafeng, Prince of Runan (汝南王 蕭大封; b. 531), ninth son
  - Xiao Dahuan, Prince of Jinxi (晉熙王 蕭大圜; 542–581), 20th son
  - Princess Nansha (南沙公主)
    - Married Yuan Xian of Chen (陳郡 袁憲; 529–598)
  - Princess Yuyao (餘姚公主)
    - Married Wang Pu of Langya (琊瑯 王溥) in 549
  - Princess Haiyan (海鹽公主), ninth daughter
    - Married Zhang Xi of Fanyang (范陽 張希)
  - Princess Anyang (安陽公主), 11th daughter
    - Married Zhang Jiao of Fanyang (范陽 張交)

== Notes ==
Regnal titles
Preceded by Emperor Wu of Liang	Emperor of Liang Dynasty; 549–551	Succeeded by Xiao Dong (Prince of Yuzhang)
