= Xiao Shunzhi =

Xiao Shunzhi 蕭順之

Marquis of Linxiang County 臨湘縣侯
- Succeeded by: Xiao Yi, Prince Jun of Zhangsha

Personal details
- Born: Zhongduli County, Lanling, Liu Song dynasty (now northern Wujin District, Changzhou Prefecture, Jiangsu)
- Died: Jiankang, Southern Qi dynasty (now Nanjing)
- Spouse: Lady Zhang
- Children: Xiao Yi; Xiao Fu; Emperor Wu of Liang; Xiao Chang; Princess Yixing; Princess Xi'an; Xiao Rong; Xiao Hong; Xiao Xiu; Xiao Wei; Xiao Dan; 9th son Xiao Hui
- Parent(s): Xiao Daoci (蕭道賜); Xiao Daoci's concubine
- Relatives: Xiao Daocheng (third cousin)
- Occupation: General
- Posthumous name: Emperor Wen (文皇帝)
- Temple name: Taizu (太祖)
- Family: Lanling Xiao

Xiao Shunzhi (Chinese: 蕭順之), courtesy name Wenwei (文緯), was a general of the Southern Qi dynasty of China. He was a third cousin and advisor of the Southern Qi founder, Xiao Daocheng (Emperor Gao of Southern Qi). His father was a distant cousin of Xiao Wenshou. His son, Xiao Yan (Emperor Wu of Liang), would become the founding emperor of the Liang dynasty.

He was honoured with the posthumous name Emperor Wen (文皇帝) and the temple name Taizu (太祖) by the Liang dynasty.

== Family ==
Xiao Shunzhi was a descendant of Western Han politician Xiao He.

Consort(s) and issues:

- Empress Wenxian, of the Zhang clan (文獻皇后 張氏, d.471), personal name Shangrou (尚柔)
  - Xiao Yi, Prince Xuanwu of Changsha (長沙宣武王 蕭懿; d. 19 November 500), 1st son
  - Xiao Fu, Prince Zhao of Yongyang (永阳昭王萧敷; 461 – 18 September 497), 2nd son
  - Xiao Yan, Emperor Wu of Liang (梁武帝 蕭衍; 464 – 12 June 549), 3rd son
  - Xiao Chang, Prince Xuan of Hengyang (衡阳宣王萧畅), 4th son
  - Xiao Lingyi, Princess Yixing (义兴长公主 蕭令嫕)
    - married Wang Lin (王琳) of Langya Wang clan and had issue (at least a son)
  - Princess Mu of Xin'an (新安穆公主)
    - Married Wang Maozhang (王茂璋) of Langya Wang clan and had issue (one son).
- Consort Dowager, of the Li clan (李太妃)
  - Xiao Rong, Prince Jian of Guiyang (桂阳简王萧融; 472 – 15 April 501), 5th son
- Consort Dowager, of the Chen clan (陈太妃)
  - Xiao Hong, Prince Jinghui of Linchuan (临川靖惠王 蕭宏; 473 – 13 May 526), 6th son
  - Xiao Wei, Prince Yuanxiang of Nanping (南平元襄王 萧伟; 476 - 7 May 533), 8th son
- Consort Dowager, of the Wu clan (吴太妃)
  - Xiao Xiu, Prince Kang of Ancheng (安成康王 蕭秀; 475 – 4 May 518), 7th son
  - Xiao Dan, Prince Zhongwu of Shixing (始兴忠武王 萧憺; 478 – 11 December 522), 11th son
- Consort Dowager, of the Fei clan (费太妃)
  - 9th son
  - Xiao Hui, Prince Zhonglie of Poyang (鄱陽忠烈王 蕭恢; 475 - 4 October 526), 10th son
