= Xiao Ji =

Chinese imperial pretender (508–553)

- Prince of Wuling

Pretender of the Liang Dynasty
- Reign: May 16, 552 – August 5, 553
- Predecessor: Xiao Dong
- Successor: Emperor Yuan
- Born: 508
- Died: August 5, 553
Full name
- Family name: Xiāo (蕭); Given name: Jì (紀)
Era name and dates
- Tiānzhèng (天正): May 16, 552 – August 5, 553
- Dynasty: Liang Dynasty

Xiao Ji (蕭紀) (508 – August 5, 553), courtesy name Shixun (世詢), known by his princely title of Prince of Wuling (武陵王), was an imperial prince and pretender to the throne of the Chinese Liang Dynasty. He was the youngest son of the dynasty's founder Emperor Wu, and he governed the modern Sichuan and Chongqing region. In 552, believing that he was destined to be emperor, he declared himself as such and advanced east to try to take the throne, but in 553, with Western Wei forces attacking his domain from the rear under the instigation of his brother Emperor Yuan, Xiao Ji's advancing forces were defeated by Emperor Yuan's, and he was killed in battle.

== Background ==
Xiao Ji was born in 508, as the eighth and youngest son of Emperor Wu. His mother was Emperor Wu's concubine Consort Ge. In his youth, he was considered studious, and his writing style was considered elegant and not overly flashy. In 514, Emperor Wu created him the Prince of Wuling, and once he got to adolescence, he was repeatedly promoted to more and more important gubernatorial positions, because he was a favorite son of Emperor Wu's. In 537, Emperor Wu made him the governor of Yi Province (modern Sichuan). While serving in that capacity, Xiao Ji carried out a greater development of the economy and also expanded Liang territory deeper into non-Han areas. During his rule, Yi Province became wealthy and strong militarily and economically.

== During the Hou Jing Disturbance ==
In 548, the rebel general Hou Jing put the capital Jiankang under siege, and many provincial governors sent forces to Jiankang to try to lift the siege. Xiao Ji, however, initially failed to take any action. After Jiankang fell and Emperor Wu died in 549, Xiao Ji finally took action in spring 550, sending a 30,000-men force commanded by his heir apparent Xiao Yuanzhao (蕭圓照), and he claimed that he was willing to have that force accept orders from his brother Xiao Yi the Prince of Xiangdong—the governor of Jing Province (荊州, modern central and western Hubei) and at that time the strongest Liang prince, who was exercising imperial authority at the time. Xiao Yi, apprehensive of Xiao Ji's intentions, made Xiao Yuanzhao the governor of Xin Province (信州, modern eastern Chongqing) and ordered him to halt at Baidicheng (the capital of Xin Province) and not advance any further.

In summer 550, the Buddhist monk Sun Tianying (孫天英) launched a peasant rebellion and attacked Chengdu (成都, in modern Chengdu, Sichuan), the capital of Yi Province. Xiao Yi engaged Sun and killed him.

in fall 550, the people of Li Province (黎州, roughly modern Guangyuan, Sichuan) -- a minor province part of Xiao Ji's domain—rebelled and expelled the governor of Li Province, Zhang Ben (張賁). The general Yang Fachen (楊法琛) entered Li, and he instigated two major clans of Li Province, the Wangs and the Jias, to petition Xiao Ji that Yang be allowed to become governor. Xiao Ji refused and imprisoned Yang's sons Yang Chongyong (楊崇顒) and Yang Chonghu (楊崇虎). In response, Yang surrendered his territory to Western Wei.

In winter 550, Xiao Ji departed Chengdu with his forces and headed east on the Yangtze River. Xiao Yi, suspicious of Xiao Ji's intentions, sent him letter to halt him, stating, "The people of Bashu [i.e., Yi Province and surrounding regions] are brave but ferocious, and they easily get emotional and difficult to control. I need you, my brother, to watch over them, so that I can destroy the bandit [i.e., Hou Jing]." He also attached a note, "Based on geography, you and I are like Liu Bei and Sun Quan, and we should each be satisfied with our territory. Based on our blood, we are like the states of Lu and Wei, and we can continuously communicate." Apparently in reaction to Xiao Yi's letter, Xiao Ji returned to Chengdu. Meanwhile, he sent the generals Yang Qianyun (楊乾運) and Qiao Yan (譙淹) against Yang Fachen. In spring 551, Yang Qianyun defeated Yang Fachen, dislodging him and forcing him to flee, but Yang Qianyun then withdrew without capturing Yang Fachen.

In summer 551, an event would cause the already uneasy relationship between Xiao Yi and Xiao Ji to grow even more strained. Xiao Ji's son Xiao Yuanzheng (蕭圓正) the Marquess of Jiang'an was the governor of Xiyang Commandery (roughly modern Huanggang, Hubei), and he enjoyed great support from the people, and his army had grown to 10,000-men strong. Xiao Yi became suspicious of him, and Xiao Yi bestowed him a general title. When Xiao Yuanzheng visited Jiangling (江陵, in modern Jingzhou, Hubei), the capital of Jing Province, to thank his uncle, Xiao Yi refused to see Xiao Yuanzheng, but instead had his cousin Xiao Ke (蕭恪) the Prince of Nanping treat him to a feast and get him drunk. Xiao Yi then put him under arrest inside Xiao Yi's mansion and seized his army, an act that angered Xiao Ji.

Also in summer 551, Hou Jing launched a major attack on Xiao Yi, and Xiao Yi, hoping for support from Western Wei, ordered his cousin Xiao Xun (蕭循) the Marquess of Yifeng, the governor of Liang Province (梁州, modern southern Shaanxi), to abandon the provincial capital Nanzheng ({{lang|zh|南鄭, in modern Hanzhong, Shaanxi) and cede Nanzheng to Western Wei. Xiao Xun disagreed with the decision, believing that cession to be without reason, but received no response from Xiao Yi. Meanwhile, Western Wei's paramount general Yuwen Tai, along with his generals Daxi Wu (達奚武) and Wang Xiong (王雄), launched a two-pronged attack on Nanzheng. Xiao Xun sent his secretary Liu Fan (劉璠) to seek aid from Xiao Ji, and Xiao Ji sent Yang Qianyun to assist Xiao Xun. Meanwhile, after hearing about the death of his older brother Emperor Jianwen at Hou's hands and Hou's subsequent seizure of the throne as the Emperor of Han, Xiao Ji, while rejecting his subordinate Liu Xiaosheng (劉孝勝)'s request to take the throne himself, began to produce wagons and clothing that were only appropriate for the emperor.

== Claim on the throne and death ==
In spring 552, after hearing that Xiao Yi was attacking Hou Jing—and, not knowing that Xiao Yi's general Wang Sengbian had already by this point defeated Hou and recaptured Jiankang—Xiao Ji made the comment, "My seventh brother [i.e., Xiao Yi] is a man of literature. How can he succeed militarily?" At that time, flowers were growing from the columns of his mansion, and he believed it to be a divine sign of favor, and he therefore declared himself emperor. When his subordinates Wang Senglüe (王僧略, Wang Sengbian's brother) and Xu Peng (徐怦) advised against the action, he had them killed—an action that caused his cousin Xiao Hui (蕭撝), whom he had created the Prince of Qin Commandery, to sigh and comment that killing skillful men was a sign of impending disaster. Meanwhile, he also summoned Xiao Xun's assistant Liu Fan, intending to make Liu Fan a member of his staff, but Liu refused and insisted on returning to Xiao Xun, and Xiao Ji finally relented and did so. (Soon, however, with Yuwen Tai having put Nanzheng under siege for months and with Yang Qianyun unable to advance to lift the siege, Xiao Xun surrendered, and Nanzheng fell into Western Wei's hands.) Xiao Ji created Xiao Yuanzhao crown prince and created his other sons imperial princes.

Xiao Yuanzhao, still at Baidicheng, was meanwhile intentionally feeding his father incorrect information—that not only had Xiao Yi not defeated Hou, but that he was on the verge of destruction by Hou's forces. Xiao Ji therefore led his forces and departed from Chengdu, planning to confront Hou. He left Xiao Hui and his son Xiao Yuansu (蕭圓肅) the Prince of Yidu in charge of Chengdu. in response, Xiao Yi carved Xiao Ji's likeness onto a wooden board, and personally hammered nails into the image to curse Xiao Ji. He also sent captives from Hou's army to Xiao Ji to show that Hou had already been destroyed. However, Xiao Yuanzhao detained Xiao Yi's messengers and continued to feed his father incorrect information, and Xiao Ji speeded up his troops. Xiao Yi, fearful of what Xiao Ji might do, requested Western Wei to attack Xiao Ji from the rear, and Yuwen, believing that Yi Province could be taken, sent his nephew Yuchi Jiong with an army to attack Yi Province. Both Yang Fachen and Yang Qianyun surrendered to Western Wei, and Yuchi quickly arrived at Chengdu and put it under siege.

Xiao Ji sent Qiao Yan to head back to Chengdu to try to lift the siege, and by now, he became aware that Hou had been destroyed. He rebuked Xiao Yuanzhao, but nevertheless decided to continue to head east to attack Xiao Yi (who by now had also claimed imperial title—as Emperor Yuan), notwithstanding his soldiers' wishes to return to Chengdu to save it. Xiao Ji was initially successful against Xiao Yi's general Lu Fahe (陸法和), and he fought through to the Three Gorges. Xiao Yi wrote him, proposing peace and promising to let him keep his domain and effectively act as emperor over that domain. Xiao Ji refused, but soon, hearing that Chengdu was in the danger of falling, and now with his forces stalled by Xiao Yi's, then tried to accept peace. By that time, however, Xiao Yi had become aware of the difficulties that Xiao Ji was in, as he was informed so by Xiao Ji's messenger Le Fengye (樂奉業), and therefore declined peace. Despite the difficult situation that he was in, however, Xiao Ji was refusing to distribute his considerable wealth to his soldiers to try to encourage them to fight; as a result, the morale sank.

By summer 553, Xiao Yi's generals Wang Lin, Xie Daren (謝答仁), and Ren Yue (任約), had defeated Xiao Ji's rear guards and cut off his retreat route, forcing Xiao Ji to continue east. Another of Xiao Yi's generals, Fan Meng (樊猛), crushed his remaining force and surrounded his ship to prevent him from fleeing. Xiao Yi sent a secret order to Fan, "If that person remains alive, then this is no success." Fan therefore boarded Xiao Ji's ship, and Xiao Ji threw a sack of gold at him, yelling, "Let me hire you with this gold -- take me to my seventh brother." Fan's response was, "How can you see the emperor? If I kill you, where is the gold going to go?" He approached Xiao Ji and killed him. Xiao Ji's son Xiao Yuanman (蕭圓滿), trying to protect his father to the end, was also killed. Xiao Yi, after Xiao Yuanzheng refused to commit suicide, starved him to death, while putting Xiao Ji's other sons under arrest. He excised Xiao Ji's line from status as members of the imperial household, and he posthumously changed Xiao Ji's surname to Taotie (饕餮, meaning "gluttonous").

== Personal information ==
- Father
  - Emperor Wu of Liang
- Mother
  - Consort Ge, Emperor Wu's concubine
- Children
  - Xiao Yuanzhao (蕭圓照), the Crown Prince (created 552)
  - Xiao Yuanzheng (蕭圓正), initially the Marquess of Jiang'an, later the prince of Xiyang (remotely created 552, starved to death by Emperor Yuan of Liang 553)
  - Xiao Yuanpu (蕭圓普), the Prince of Qiao (created 552)
  - Xiao Yuansu (蕭圓肅), the Prince of Yidu (created 552)
  - Xiao Yuanman (蕭圓滿), the Prince of Jingling (created 552, killed in battle 553)

== Notes and references ==
- Book of Liang, vol. 55.
- History of Southern Dynasties, vol. 53.
- Zizhi Tongjian, vols. 147, 157, 159, 163, 164, 165.

Chinese royalty
Preceded by Xiao Dong (Prince of Yuzhang)	Emperor of Liang Dynasty (Western); 552–553	Succeeded by Emperor Yuan of Liang
Preceded by Xiao Dong (Prince of Yuzhang)	Emperor of China (Southwestern); 552–553	Succeeded by Emperor Fei of Western Wei
