= Zhu Yi (Liang dynasty) =

Zhu Yi
- Traditional Chinese: 朱異
- Simplified Chinese: 朱异
Transcriptions
Standard Mandarin
- Hanyu Pinyin: Zhū Yì

Zhu Yi (483 – February 16, 549), courtesy name Yanhe (彥和), was an official of the Chinese dynasty Liang dynasty in the Northern and Southern dynasties period. He was greatly trusted by Emperor Wu in Emperor Wu's old age. He is often depicted by historians as corrupt and duplicitous, as well as a reason for Liang's downfall.

== Background ==
Zhu Yi was born in Qiantang County of Wu Commandery, which is in present-day Hangzhou, Zhejiang, and was a member of Zhu clan of Wu (吴郡朱氏). His father Zhu Xuanzhi (朱選之) was known for his integrity, but was only a county magistrate at the prime of his career. His mother was the daughter of Gu Huan of the Gu clan of Wu. Zhu Yi himself, when young, became known for his knowledge of the Confucian classics, history, and astrology. When he met Emperor Wu's minister Shen Yue, Shen was impressed by him, and although Zhu was not yet at the age of 24, which was generally required for junior Liang officials, Zhu was selected as an official at age 20, in 503. That year, he was selected to publicly pronounce Emperor Wu's commentaries on the Xiao Jing—an honor for junior officials—and from that point, he was repeatedly promoted. This was particularly the case after 524, when Zhu correctly judged that the rival Northern Wei's general Yuan Faseng (元法僧) was truly surrendering his garrison of Pengcheng to Liang. That year, one of Emperor Wu's co-de facto prime ministers, Zhou She, died, and after Zhou's death Zhu became increasingly involved in drafting edicts for Emperor Wu and in making judgment in some important matters. He was described to be quick in his reactions, getting work done quickly. After Xu Mian's death in 535, Zhu became de facto prime minister, although he never got that title. By this point, Zhu was considered to be capable but corrupt, often accepting large bribes and then making recommendations to Emperor Wu based on those bribes. The historian Sima Guang commented about Zhu in this manner in his Zizhi Tongjian:

Zhu was spectacular in his writing talent, and for his quick and proper reactions. He used all his effort to build up his reputation among the people. Zhu carefully served the emperor, and was good at flattering. He spent 30 years in power, and he was exceedingly corrupt, deceiving and covering the eyes of the emperor. The people of the entire empire, regardless of how far they were from the capital, hated him greatly. Zhu's garden, residence, favorite items, food, entertainment, and women were all best in the empire. Whenever he had a vacation and returned to his home, the streets were filled with the wagons of his guests.

== Descent ==
In 547, the Eastern Wei (Note: a branch successor state of Northern Wei) general Hou Jing, not willing to submit to Gao Cheng, the son of the paramount general Gao Huan after Gao Huan's death, surrendered his domain—13 provinces forming the region between the Huai River and the Yellow River—to Liang. Emperor Wu initially hesitated at accepting Hou's defection, given his long-standing peace with Eastern Wei, but Zhu, seeing how deep in his heart Emperor Wu wanted more territory, greatly encouraged him to accept Hou. However, both Hou and the army Emperor Wu sent to support Hou, commanded by Emperor Wu's nephew Xiao Yuanming the Marquess of Zhenyang, were defeated by the Eastern Wei general Murong Shaozong. Xiao Yuanming was captured by Murong, while Hou lost his entire territory. Emperor Wu made Hou the governor of Southern Yu Province (南豫州, modern central Anhui), but at Zhu's suggestion, entered into peace talks with Eastern Wei. Hou became apprehensive, and he paid a large bribe to Zhu to ask Zhu to stop the peace talks.

Zhu, who was the dominant statesmen at Emperor Wu's court, accepted Hou's bribes but refused to intercede. At the same time, not taking Hou seriously, Zhu rejected warnings from Emperor Wu's nephew Xiao Fan (蕭範) the Prince of Poyang to prepare for a Hou rebellion. He dismissed Fan while saying "Jing has with him but a few hundred rebellious caitiffs. What can they do?"

Soon, Hou was suspicious that he would be betrayed, and he forged a letter from Gao Cheng, offering to trade Xiao Yuanming for Hou. Emperor Wu, after Zhu convinced him that Hou posed no actual threat, accepted—and when Hou saw this, he rebelled in 548, claiming that he was seeking to clear the court of evil officials—Zhu, along with Xu Lin (徐麟), Lu Yan (陸驗), and Zhou Shizhen (周石珍). Even then, Zhu did not take Hou seriously, and when the general Yang Kan suggested blocking Hou's path to the Yangtze River, Zhu advised against it, and Emperor Wu did not do so, allowing Hou to cross the Yangtze easily and put the capital Jiankang under siege.

During the siege, Hou again repeatedly stated that he was only seeking to execute Zhu. When Emperor Wu asked his crown prince Xiao Gang whether the crimes that Hou accused Zhu of were true, Xiao Gang indicated that they were true—but subsequently spoke against Emperor Wu's thought of executing Zhu, arguing that doing so would only encourage Hou. Zhu was therefore spared, and subsequently participated in the city's defense, and he wrote letters to Hou trying to persuade Hou to lift the siege, to no avail. When Hou's general Fan Taobang (范桃棒) subsequently offered to defect and kill Hou, Zhu greatly advocated for the plan, but Xiao Gang suspected Fan's intentions and therefore did not act on the offer. (Note: Hou subsequently discovered Fan's plan and executed him.)

The people of the capital all believed that Hou's rebellion was stoked by Zhu's corruption. Zhu, in embarrassment and fear, became ill. He died in 549, with the city still under siege. Emperor Wu, still believing in his faithfulness, buried him with honor.

The author of Book of Liang, Yao Silian, when summarizing Zhu Yi's life, attributed his political successes in Emperor Wu's court to his craftiness.

Tang dynasty politician Wei Zheng believed that Zhu Yi was deeply trusted by Emperor Wu of Liang but the Emperor's partial and subjective trust on him was not advisable and should be avoided by any ruler.

== In literature ==
Zhu Yi, along with Zhao Gao, Wang Mang, and An Lushan was listed as one of the four treacherous Chinese historical figures in the monogatari The Tale of the Heike. In the monogatari, the author argued that Zhu Yi caused the fall of Liang dynasty.
