= Xiao Zhengde =

Chinese Liang dynasty prince (died 549)

- Prince of Linhe; Marquess of Xifeng

Pretender of the Liang Dynasty
- Pretence: 548–549
- Monarch(s): Emperor Wu
- Died: 8 August, 549
Names
- Family name: Xiāo (蕭); Given name: Zhèngdé (正德)
Era dates
- Zhengping (正平; 548–549)
- House: Lanling Xiao
- Father: Xiao Hong

Xiao Zhengde (蕭正德) (died 8 August, 549), courtesy name Gonghe (公和), was an imperial prince and briefly an emperor of the Chinese Liang Dynasty.

It is not known when Xiao Zhengde was born, but it was known that he was the third son of Xiao Hong (蕭宏), a minor official during Southern Qi and a younger brother of the generals Xiao Yi (蕭懿) and Xiao Yan. As Xiao Yan initially did not have any sons, Xiao Yan adopted Xiao Zhengde to be his own son.

However, in 501, while Xiao Yan was engaged in a civil war against the cruel and arbitrary Southern Qi emperor Xiao Baojuan, Xiao Yan's concubine Ding Lingguang (丁令光) gave birth to a son, Xiao Tong. Despite that, after Xiao Yan overthrew Xiao Baojuan and in 502 forced Xiao Baojuan's brother Emperor He of Southern Qi to yield the throne to him, ending Southern Qi and starting Liang Dynasty (as its Emperor Wu), Xiao Zhengde hoped to be crown prince. Instead, Emperor Wu reversed the adoption and returned Xiao Zhengde to Xiao Hong's line, creating him only the Marquess of Xifeng.

Xiao Zhengde was not at all content with being just a marquess, and he resented the reversal of the adoption. In 522, he fled to rival Northern Wei, claiming to be Liang's deposed crown prince, and sought military assistance. The Northern Wei official Xiao Baoyin, a brother of Xiao Baojuan, instead suggested that Xiao Zhengde be put to death. The Northern Wei government did not kill Xiao Zhengde, but did not treat him with respect. He believed himself to be in danger, and he created a subterfuge—killing a boy and claiming that the boy was his, burying the boy far from the Northern Wei capital Luoyang. In 523, he fled back to Liang. Emperor Wu did not punish him, and in fact restored him to his title and positions.

After Xiao Zhengde's return to Liang, however, he did not regret his actions, but instead gathered thugs, often leading them in robberies. In 525, Xiao Zhengde was a general under the command of Emperor Wu's son Xiao Zong (蕭綜) the Prince of Yuzhang, defending the city of Pengcheng, which was surrendered to Liang by the Northern Wei general Yuan Faseng (元法僧) earlier that year. Xiao Zong, who had long suspected himself to be actually the son of Xiao Baojuan (since his mother Consort Wu was a concubine of Xiao Baojuan and had given birth to him only seven months after becoming Emperor Wu's concubine), defected to Northern Wei during the campaign, and his forces collapsed. Xiao Zhengde abandoned his troops and fled back to the capital Jiankang. Because of crimes he had previously committed and because of his abandoning his forces, Emperor Wu stripped Xiao Zhengde of his title and offices and exiled him to Linhai. However, even before Xiao Zhengde could reach Linhai, Emperor Wu sent a messenger pardoning him and restoring him to his title.

Xiao Tong died in 531, and Emperor Wu, because he then made Xiao Tong's younger brother Xiao Gang crown prince, bypassing Xiao Tong's sons Xiao Huan (蕭歡), Xiao Yu (蕭譽), and Xiao Cha, he created Xiao Huan, Xiao Yu, and Xiao Cha princes. At this time, Xiao Zhengde flattered Emperor Wu's favorite official Zhu Yi, and Zhu Yi spoke on his behalf, reminding Emperor Wu that Xiao Zhengde was previously his son, but was now only a marquess. Emperor Wu therefore created Xiao Zhengde the greater title of Prince of Linhe.

Xiao Zhengde was still not satisfied, however. When the general Hou Jing rebelled in fall 548, he, knowing Xiao Zhengde's disaffection, made secret overtures to Xiao Zhengde, promising to make him emperor. When Emperor Wu subsequently sent Xiao Zhengde with an army to try to resist Hou, Xiao Zhengde turned against Emperor Wu and joined forces with Hou. After Hou put Jiankang under siege and captured the outer city, forcing forces loyal to Emperor Wu to withdraw into the palace walls, Xiao Zhengde was declared emperor. He created his heir apparent Xiao Jianli (蕭見理) crown prince, and married a daughter to Hou. (Xiao Jianli soon died in a raid that he conducted at night.) He also made a pact with Hou that when the palace fell, Emperor Wu and Xiao Gang would not be spared. In spring 549, when Hou briefly entered into negotiations with Emperor Wu and Xiao Gang for peace, Xiao Zhengde spoke against it, and Hou subsequently reneged on the peace terms. When the palace fell, however, despite Xiao Zhengde's efforts to have Emperor Wu and Xiao Gang killed, Hou prevented it, instead using Emperor Wu as his pawn and deposing Xiao Zhengde back to his title of Prince of Linhe, although conferring him a highly honorary office of Dasima (大司馬). Xiao Zhengde became depressed, and when he subsequently met Emperor Wu, he wept bitterly. Emperor Wu responded, "You weep and weep, but is it not too late for you to regret?"

Xiao Zhengde resented Hou for reneging on the agreement, and he subsequently sent letters to his cousin Xiao Fan (蕭範) the Prince of Poyang, requesting that Xiao Fan come to Jiankang's relief. The letters were intercepted by Hou's forces, and in summer 549, Hou strangled Xiao Zhengde to death.

== Era name ==
- Zhengping (正平 zhèng píng) 548-549

== Personal information ==
- Father
  - Xiao Hong (蕭宏) (473 - 13 May 526), Prince Jinghui of Linchuan, younger brother of Emperor Wu of Liang
- Concubine
  - Princess Changle, Xiao Zhengde's younger sister (original husband was Xie Xi), name changed to Lady Liu after faking her death, mother of two sons
- Children
  - Xiao Jianli (蕭見理), the Crown Prince (created and killed in battle 548)
  - Two sons by "Lady Liu"
  - A daughter, wife of Hou Jing

== Notes and references ==
- Book of Liang, vol. 55 .
- History of Southern Dynasties, vol. 51 .
- Zizhi Tongjian, vols. 149, 150, 155, 161, 162.
