= Xu Mian =

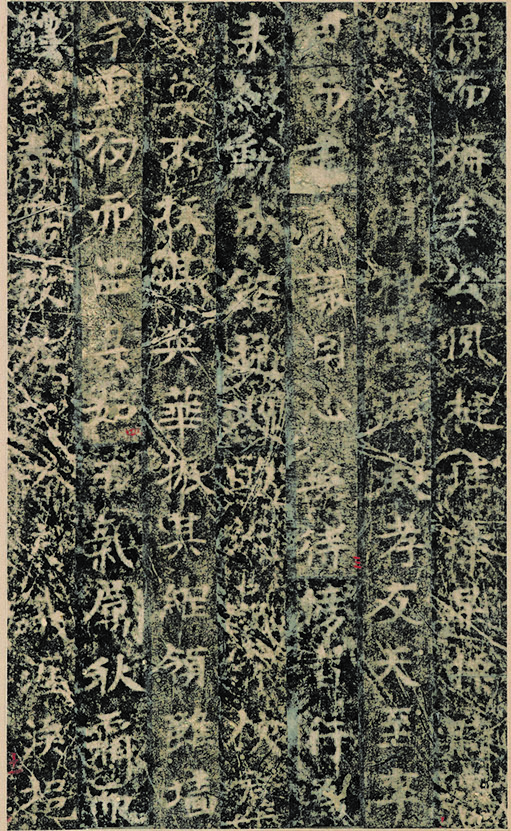
Song dynasty rubbings of the epitaphs of Liang Xiaofu and Consort Jing

Xu Mian (徐勉) (466–535), courtesy name Xiuren (脩仁), formally Duke Jiansu (簡肅公, literally "the undiscriminating and solemn duke"), was an official of the Chinese Liang dynasty. He was never titular prime minister, but was largely considered a de facto prime minister and well regarded by his contemporaries.

Xu Mian's grandfather Xu Zhangzong (徐長宗) was an officer under Emperor Wu of Liu Song, and his father Xu Rong (徐融) was a commandery governor. However, the Xu family was not rich. When he was young, Xu Mian became known for studiousness, and he was retained by Southern Qi's prime minister Wang Jian to serve as an assistant. Wang was impressed by Xu's abilities, and often stated that he had the capability to become prime minister. Around this time, Xu also befriended the army officer Xiao Yi (蕭懿), who later became a general.

In 502, Xiao Yi's brother Xiao Yan forced Emperor He of Southern Qi to yield the throne to him, establishing Liang as its Emperor Wu. Having known Xu from the time when Xu and Xiao Yi were friends, Emperor Wu made him a mid-level official. After the prime minister Fan Yun died in 503, Emperor Wu entrusted the important matters of state to Xu and Zhou She, effectively making them co-prime ministers, even though neither carried the title and neither received particularly high rank.

As de facto prime minister, Xu was considered to be capable, diligent, and honest. He often spent nights at his office, rather than his house—so much so that when he went home, his dogs would not recognize him and would bark at him. During his service, Xu also authored works designed to reestablish the formality of funeral mournings. He did not care for storing wealth, and whenever he had possessions, he would give them to the poorer members of his clan.

In 524, Xu Mian's second son Xu Fei (徐悱) died, and Xu Mian was so distressed that he tried to resign his post, but Emperor Wu would not let him. Also in 524, Zhou She died, and thereafter Xu handled prime minister duties alone. By 531, however, his resignation on account of illness appeared to have been accepted, as his posts from that point on appeared honorary. He died in 535, and both Emperor Wu and his crown prince Xiao Gang personally mourned Xu. Xu was awarded the posthumous name "Duke Jiansu," even though there is no record that Emperor Wu ever created him a duke while he was alive or posthumously.
