= Ding Lingguang =

Chinese empress dowager (485–527)

Ding Lingguang 丁令光
- Empress Dowager Mu 穆皇太后
- Born: 485; Qiao County, Southern Qi (today Bozhou, Anhui)
- Died: 3 January 527 (age 41); Liang Dynasty
- Spouse: Xiao Yan, Emperor Wu of Liang
- Issue: Emperor Zhaoming; Xiao Gang, Emperor Jianwen; Xiao Xu, Prince Lulingwei
Posthumous name
- Consort Mu (穆妃); Empress Dowager Mu (穆皇太后)

Ding Lingguang (丁令光; 485 – 3 January 527), formally known as Empress Dowager Mu (穆皇太后), was an imperial concubine of Xiao Yan, Emperor Wu of Liang Dynasty. She was a native of Qiao County (谯国), today's Bozhou City, Anhui Province.

== Life ==
Ding Lingguang was born a commoner in Qiao County. A legend details that when she was born, light filled the room. At age fourteen, Xiao Yan, then Governor of Yongzhou (雍州刺史), fell in love with her. Her parents broke Ding's then-engagement and offered her as a concubine to Xiao Yan.

In September or October 501, Concubine Ding gave birth to her first child, a son, named Xiao Tong (蕭統). In April of the next year, Xiao Yan established the Liang dynasty. He awarded Ding the title of Noble Imperial Concubine, one of the highest titles held by women in Liang Dynasty. Her only son at that time, Xiao Tong, was made Crown Prince (皇太子). They both lived in Xianyang hall.

Ding Lingguang disliked splendid or gorgeous ornaments, gaining the favor of the Emperor and the respect of lesser ranking concubines. On December 2, 503, Noble Imperial Concubine Ding gave birth to Xiao Gang (蕭綱) and in 506 gave birth to Xiao Xu (蕭續).

She died in January 527 and her husband honored her as Consort Mu (穆妃). Her son, Crown Prince Xiao Tong, died in May 531 before his father and was succeeded by his full-brother, Xiao Gang. After Xiao Gang became Emperor, he elevated his mother's status, posthumously honoring her as Empress Dowager Mu (穆太后).

== Title ==
- During the reign of Emperor Wu of Southern Qi (11 April 482 – 27 August 493)
  - Lady Ding (丁氏; from 484)
- During the reign of Xiao Baojuan of Southern Qi (498–501)
  - Concubine (妾; from 498)
- During the reign of Emperor Wu of Liang (30 April 502–549)
  - Noble Imperial Concubine (貴嬪; from August 502)
  - Consort Mu (穆妃; from 526)
- During the reign of Emperor Jianwen of Liang (549–551)
  - Empress Dowager Mu (穆太后; after 549)

== Issue ==
- As a Concubine:
  - Xiao Tong, Emperor Zhaoming (昭明皇帝 蕭統; 501–30 May 531), Xiao Yan's 1st son
- As a Noble Imperial Concubine:
  - Xiao Gang, Emperor Jianwen (簡文皇帝 蕭綱; 2 December 503 – 551), Xiao Yan's third son
  - Xiao Xu, Prince Lulingwei (廬陵威王 蕭續; 506–547), Xiao Yan's fifth son
