= Emperor Wu of Liang =

Emperor of Liang from 502 to 549

Emperor Wu of Liang 梁武帝
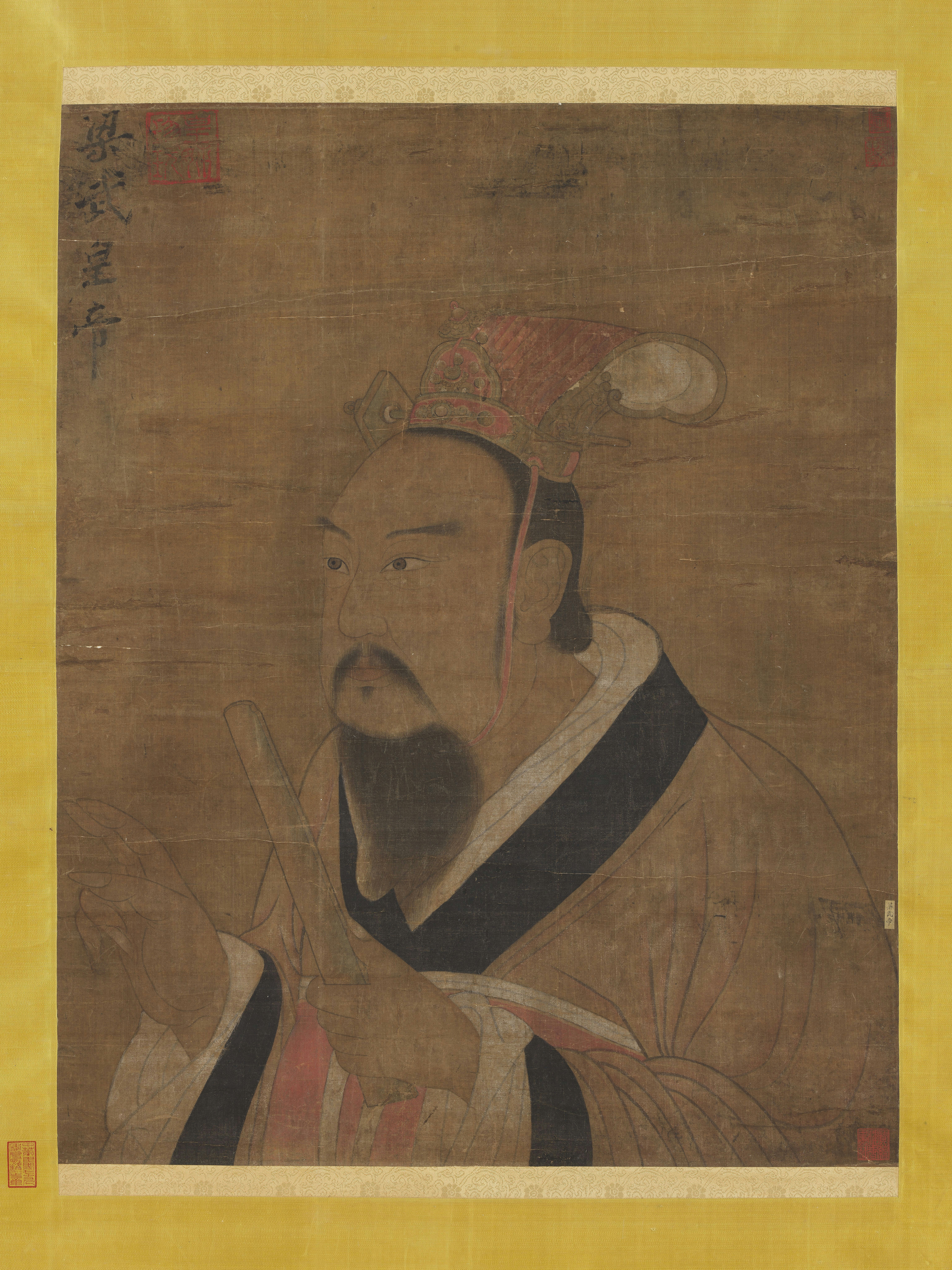

Emperor of the Liang dynasty
- Reign: 30 April 502 – 12 June 549
- Predecessor: dynasty established, Emperor He as Emperor of Southern Qi
- Successor: Emperor Jianwen
- Pretender: Xiao Zhengde (from 548 to 549)
- Born: Xiao Lian'er (蕭練兒); 464
- Died: 549 (aged 84–85)
- Burial: Xiu Mausoleum (修陵, in present-day Danyang, Jiangsu)
- Consorts: Empress Wude; Empress Dowager Mu; Empress Dowager Wenxuan
- Issue: See § Family
Names
- Family name: Xiāo (蕭); Given name: Yǎn (衍)
Era dates
- Tiān jiān (天監): 502-519; Pǔ tōng (普通): 520-527; Dà tōng (大通): 527-529; Zhōng dà tōng (中大通): 529-534; Dà tóng (大同): 535-546; Zhōng dà tóng (中大同): 546-547; Tài qīng (太清): 547-549
Posthumous name
- Emperor Wǔ (武皇帝, lit. "martial")
Temple name
- Gāozǔ (高祖)
- House: Lanling Xiao
- Father: Xiao Shunzhi
- Mother: Zhang Shangrou (Note: Lady Zhang was a descendant of Zhang Hua. However, her biography in Liang Shu contradicts itself by stating that her father Wang Muzhi was both a sixth-generation descendant of Zhang Hua and a great-grandson of Zhang Yu (Zhang Hua's grandson); if the latter is true, Zhang Muzhi would then be a fifth-generation descendant of Zhang Hua. Her biography in Nan Shi only mentioned that her father Wang Muzhi was a sixth-generation descendant of Zhang Hua.)

Emperor Wu of Liang (Chinese: 梁武帝) (464 – 12 June 549), personal name Xiao Yan (蕭衍), courtesy name Shuda (叔達), childhood name Lian'er (練兒), was the founding emperor of the Chinese Liang dynasty, during the Northern and Southern dynasties period. His reign, until its end, was one of the most stable and prosperous among the Southern dynasties. He came from the same Xiao clan of Lanling (蘭陵蕭氏) that ruled the preceding Southern Qi dynasty, but from a different branch.

Emperor Wu established universities and extended the Confucian civil service exams, demanding that sons of nobles (士族) study. He was well read himself and wrote poetry and patronized the arts. Although for governmental affairs he was Confucian in values, he embraced Buddhism as well. He himself was attracted to many Indian traditions. He banned the sacrifice of animals and was against execution. It was said that he received the Buddhist precepts during his reign, earning him the nickname The Bodhisattva Emperor. The emperor is the namesake of the Emperor Liang Jeweled Repentance (梁皇寳懺; Liang Huang Bao Chan), a widely read and major Buddhist text in China and Korea.

At the end of his reign, his unduly lenient attitude towards his clan's and officials' corruption and lack of dedication to the state came at a heavy price; when the general Hou Jing rebelled (侯景之亂), few came to his aid, and Hou captured the imperial capital Jiankang, holding Emperor Wu and his successor Emperor Jianwen under close control and plunging the entire Liang state into anarchy. After Emperor Wu was imprisoned, he was thirsty and asked Hou for honey, but Hou refused to give it to him. After shouting several times, the Emperor supposedly died of hunger and thirst.

== Background ==
Xiao Yan was born in 464, during the reign of Emperor Xiaowu of Song. His mother Zhang Shangrou (張尚柔) was a descendant of Zhang Hua. His father Xiao Shunzhi (蕭順之), who claimed ancestry from the great Han dynasty prime minister Xiao He, was a third cousin of the Liu Song general Xiao Daocheng, and was part of Xiao Daocheng's close circle of advisors in Xiao Daocheng's eventual seizure of the Liu Song throne and establishment of Southern Qi (as its Emperor Gao) in 479. For Xiao Shunzhi's contributions, Xiao Daocheng created him the Marquess of Linxiang and made him a general. Xiao Yan was Xiao Shunzhi's third son, his mother was also the mother of his older brothers Xiao Yi (蕭懿) and Xiao Fu (蕭敷), his younger brother Xiao Chang (蕭暢) and his younger sister Xiao Lingyi (蕭令嫕). Lady Zhang died in 471, predating Xiao Shunzhi's becoming a marquess during Southern Qi.

Xiao Yan had six other brothers born of Xiao Shunzhi's concubines. One of them, Xiao Xiu (475–518) is now mainly remembered because of his comparatively well-preserved funerary statuary ensemble near Nanjing.

Around 481 or 482, Xiao Yan married Chi Hui (郗徽), the daughter of Liu Song official Chi Ye (郗燁) and the Princess Xunyang. They had three daughters—Xiao Yuyao (蕭玉姚), Xiao Yuwan (蕭玉婉), and Xiao Yuhuan (蕭玉嬛), but no sons.

== Career as Southern Qi official and general ==
Xiao Yan was considered intelligent and handsome in his youth, and he started his career as a Southern Qi official by serving as military assistant for Emperor Wu's son Xiao Zilun (蕭子倫) the Prince of Baling, and later served on the staff of the prime minister Wang Jian. Wang was said to be impressed by Xiao Yan's talents and appearance, and he once said, "Mr. Xiao will be Shizhong [侍中, a high-level post] before he turns 30, and his honor will be innumerable after he turns 30." Xiao Yan also associated with Wang's successor as prime minister, Emperor Wu's son Xiao Ziliang (蕭子良) the Prince of Jingling, and became one of eight young officials talented in the literary arts particularly befriended by Xiao Ziliang—along with Fan Yun, Xiao Chen (蕭琛), Ren Fang (任昉), Wang Rong (王融), Xie Tiao (謝朓), Shen Yue, and Lu Chui (陸倕). After his father Xiao Shunzhi died in 490, he temporary left governmental service, but subsequently returned, and by 493 was serving on Xiao Ziliang's staff, but he did not join Wang Rong's plan to start a coup to have Xiao Ziliang made emperor when Emperor Wu grew ill in 493; the throne, instead, went to the crown prince, Emperor Wu's grandson Xiao Zhaoye. Xiao Yan subsequently was invited by the prime minister Xiao Luan to serve on his staff, and when Xiao Luan subsequently overthrew the frivolous Xiao Zhaoye in a coup, Xiao Yan was made a general and ordered to defend the important city Shouyang (壽陽, in modern Lu'an, Anhui). When Xiao Luan later took the throne (as Emperor Ming), Xiao Yan was created the Baron of Jianyang. In 495, when Northern Wei forces invade, Xiao Yan was on the frontline fighting Northern Wei troops, and he distinguished himself under the command of Wang Guangzhi (王廣之). Later that year, when Emperor Ming suspected the general Xiao Chen (蕭諶) of treason and executed him, it was Xiao Yan that he sent to arrest and execute Xiao Chen's brother Xiao Dan (蕭誕) the governor of Si Province (司州, modern southeastern Henan).

In 497, with Northern Wei again attacking, Xiao Yan was one of the generals that Emperor Ming sent to aid the embattled Yong Province (雍州, modern southwestern Henan and northwestern Hubei). Even though both he and his commander, Cui Huijing (崔慧景), were subsequently defeated by Northern Wei forces in battle, in 498 Xiao Yan was made the governor of Yong Province and the defender of Yong Province's capital, the important city Xiangyang (襄陽, in modern Xiangfan, Hubei), and he continued in that post after Emperor Ming's death and succession by his son Xiao Baojuan. It was at Xiangyang that Xiao Yan's wife Chi Hui died in 499. Xiao Yan would not take another wife for the rest of his life, although he would have a number of concubines.

== Civil war against Xiao Baojuan ==
When Xiao Baojuan became Southern Qi's emperor in 498 at age 15, his power was initially curbed by several high-level officials that his father Emperor Ming left in charge—including Emperor Ming's cousins Jiang Shi (江祏) and Jiang Si (江祀), Xiao Baojuan's own uncle Liu Xuan (劉暄), Xiao Baojuan's cousin Xiao Yaoguang (蕭遙光) the Prince of Shi'an, the senior official Xu Xiaosi (徐孝嗣), and the general Xiao Tanzhi (蕭坦之). The six officials each handled important matters of state according to their will and paid the young emperor little deference, drawing his ire. Xiao Yan, hearing that the young emperor had a reputation for being violent and frivolous, secretly prepared for eventual civil war at his post at Yong Province, but was unable to persuade his older brother Xiao Yi, who was then the acting governor of Ying Province (郢州, modern eastern Hubei), to do the same.

In 499, receiving report that the high-level officials were planning to, on account of his irrational behavior, remove him from the throne, Xiao Baojuan acted first and executed Jiang Shi and Jiang Si. Xiao Yaoguang, who wanted to be emperor himself and feared being the next target, started an unsuccessful coup and was soon defeated and killed. However, despite the contributions of Xiao Tanzhi, Xu Xiaosi, Liu Xuan, and the generals Shen Wenji (沈文季) and Cao Hu (曹虎) in defeating Xiao Yaoguang, Xiao Baojuan soon had all of them killed as well on suspicion of plotting coups, leading to widespread sense of terror among central government officials. This led to a rebellion by the senior general Chen Xianda (陳顯達) from his post at Jiang Province (江州, modern Jiangxi and Fujian), which was quickly defeated as well, fanning Xiao Baojuan's sense of invulnerability. In fear, the general Pei Shuye (裴叔業), who controlled Shouyang as the governor of Yu Province (豫州, modern central Anhui), surrendered Shouyang to Northern Wei in 500, despite Xiao Yan's counsel against it.

Xiao Baojuan sent Cui Huijing to try to recapture Shouyang. Cui Huijing, however, as soon as he left the capital Jiankang, turned his army around and marched on the capital, hoping to overthrow Xiao Baojuan and replace him with his brother Xiao Baoxuan (蕭寶玄) the Prince of Jiangxia. Cui was initially successful, surrounding Xiao Baojuan's troops inside the palace complex. However, Xiao Yi, upon hearing news of Cui's rebellion, marched troops under his command to relieve the palace siege. He routed Cui's forces, and Cui was killed while trying to escape. Xiao Baojuan made Xiao Yi the prime minister, but soon killed him as well, on 19 November 500. Upon hearing of Xiao Yi's death, Xiao Yan gathered his officers on 15 December 500 and revealed to them his intention to rebel; he officially rose in rebellion in January or February 501.

Xiao Baojuan sent an army commanded by the general Liu Shanyang (劉山陽) against Xiao Yan, but Xiao Yan convinced Xiao Yingzhou (蕭穎冑), the chief of staff of Xiao Baojuan's younger brother Xiao Baorong the Prince of Nankang, who was then governor of Jing Province (荊州, modern central and western Hubei), that Liu was intending to attack both Jing and Yong Province. Xiao Yingzhou therefore entered into an alliance with Xiao Yan, and Xiao Yingzhou surprised and killed Liu, and then declared that his and Xiao Yan's intent was to declare Xiao Baorong emperor, although he did not immediately have Xiao Baorong take the imperial title. (Privately, Xiao Yan's staff was distrustful of Xiao Yingzhou and wanted to seize Xiao Baorong by force, but Xiao Yan, not willing to create a division in the coalition at that moment, concentrated on advancing east against Xiao Baojuan rather than to seize Xiao Baorong.)

In spring 501, Xiao Yingzhou declared Xiao Baorong emperor (as Emperor He), a declaration that Xiao Yan recognized. Xiao Yingzhou had himself and Xiao Yan given equivalent titles, and Xiao Yingzhou remained at Jiangling (江陵, in modern Jingzhou, Hubei), the capital of Jing Province, with the new emperor, while Xiao Yan continued to advance against the old emperor Xiao Baojuan. With Xiao Baojuan having lost the love of his generals (and having to fight off several more coup attempts within Jiankang itself), Xiao Yan was able to win battle after battle, capturing Yingcheng (郢城, in modern Wuhan, Hubei) in summer 501, and then forcing the surrender of Chen Bozhi (陳伯之), the governor of Jiang Province, in fall 501. In winter 501, he reached Jiankang and quickly captured the outer city, and then put the palace under siege. Meanwhile, Xiao Yingzhou, unable to fend off attacks that the general Xiao Gui (蕭璝), loyal to Xiao Baojuan, was launching from the west, died in anxiety. Xiao Yan's brother Xiao Dan (蕭儋) quickly arrived in Jiangling to take over custody of Emperor He, along with Xiao Yingzhou's lieutenant Xiaohou Xiang (夏侯詳). From that point on, the control of the new emperor was no longer contested.

Around the new year 502, Xiao Baojuan's generals Wang Zhenguo (王珍國) and Zhang Ji (張稷), fearful that Xiao Baojuan would kill them because they were unable to lift the siege, assassinated Xiao Baojuan and surrendered. Xiao Yan entered the palace triumphantly, and, making Xiao Zhaoye's mother Empress Dowager Wang Baoming titular regent, he had himself made the supreme commander and the Duke of Jian'an.

== Establishment of the Liang dynasty ==
Xiao Yan soon conspired to gain the throne for himself. Consulting with his old friends Shen Yue and Fan Yun, he put his brothers and associates into important posts, while having Empress Dowager Wang grant him higher and higher honors and titles, while delaying Emperor He's return to the capital. He also began to execute Emperor He's brothers and cousins one by one, to eliminate the possibility of resisting his moves. (Emperor He's brother Xiao Baoyin the Prince of Poyang, however, would escape to Northern Wei, and for decades would pose a threat as a Northern Wei general.) He had himself created as Duke of Liang and then Prince of Liang, and given the nine bestowments, all signs of an impending takeover. Only with these preparations in place did he have Emperor He sent back toward the capital. In the spring of 502 however, while Emperor He had only reached Gushu (姑孰, in modern Ma'anshan, Anhui), Xiao Yan had him issue an edict giving the throne to Xiao Yan, ending Southern Qi and beginning the Liang dynasty. Xiao Yan created Emperor He the Prince of Baling, but soon had him put to death, ending Emperor Ming's line (except for Xiao Baoyin, and Xiao Baoyi who was born disabled), although he treated Emperor Gao's and Emperor Wu's remaining progeny (most of those two emperors' progeny having been slaughtered by Emperor Ming) with honor and respect, making many of them his officials, reasoning that he and Southern Qi's imperial clan were of the same family. Emperor Wu created his infant son Xiao Tong, who was born of his concubine Consort Ding during the war against Xiao Baojuan, crown prince. (He had previously adopted his brother Xiao Hong (蕭宏)'s son Xiao Zhengde as his son, and Xiao Zhengde wanted to be crown prince; instead, after creating Xiao Tong crown prince, Emperor Wu rescinded the adoption and returned Xiao Zhengde to Xiao Hong's household, drawing Xiao Zhengde's resentment.)

== Early reign ==
The early reign of Emperor Wu was considered to be Liang dynasty's prime. He was considered diligent and frugal, and he tried to foster willingness for his officials to have different opinions than his. However, an immediate troubling sign for his reign, which would become increasingly serious as time went on, was how he appeared to be willing to tolerate corruption by his own family members, particularly his brother Xiao Hong the Prince of Linchuan, and those high-level officials who he felt contributed to his establishment of Liang.

Emperor Wu also became the first emperor in Southern dynasties' history to explicitly grant prime ministerial authorities to designated officials who were not prime ministers in name. He first granted those authorities to Fan Yun, and after Fan's death in 503, granted those authorities to Zhou She and Xu Mian, even though neither officially carried a high rank until late in their careers.

Two immediate threats that Emperor Wu had to deal with upon ascending the throne were rebellions by Chen Bozhi, who did not feel secure in his position despite Emperor Wu's permitting him to remain as the governor of Jiang Province, and Liu Jilian (劉季連) the governor of Yi Province (modern Sichuan and Chongqing), who was similarly apprehensive. By winter 502, however, Chen had been defeated by Emperor Wu's general Wang Mao (王茂) and was forced to flee to Northern Wei. In spring 503, Liu surrendered to Emperor Wu's general Deng Yuanqi (鄧元起), and the realm was pacified.

However, in fall 503, Emperor Xuanwu of Northern Wei, with a mind of having Xiao Baoyin reestablish Southern Qi as a puppet state, commissioned Xiao Baoyin and Chen with armies, and further sent his father Emperor Xiaowen's cousin Yuan Cheng (元澄) the Prince of Rencheng to lead a force to attack Liang, starting a war that lasted several years. Both sides had victories. However, Liang lost the important border city Yiyang (義陽, in modern Xinyang, Henan) in fall 504, and in spring 505, the general Xiahou Daoqian (夏侯道遷) rebelled and surrendered another important border city, Nanzheng (南鄭, in modern Hanzhong, Shaanxi) to Northern Wei. (It was in the aftermaths of Xiahou's rebellion that the first serious instance of Emperor Wu's refusal to punish a family member happened, as his nephew Xiao Yuanzao (蕭淵藻) the Marquess of Xichang, angry that when he rendezvoused with Deng Yuanqi that Deng took the best horses, assassinated Deng and falsely accused Deng of treason. While Emperor Wu discovered that Xiao Yuanzao's accusations were false and posthumously honored Deng, he took no punishment against Xiao Yuanzao other than demoting his rank.) In 505, Emperor Wu launched a major counterattack, commanded by Xiao Hong, with Liang's best troops. However, the apprehensive Xiao Hong stopped his army at Luokou (洛口, in modern Bengbu, Anhui) and refused to advance, despite his generals' urging. Meanwhile, in spring 506, the general Wei Rui (韋叡) was able to capture Hefei (合肥, in modern Hefei, Anhui), taken by Northern Wei when Pei Shuye surrendered Shouyang to Northern Wei. In fall 506, Xiao Hong's army, stationed at Luokou for nearly a year without advancing, had an attack of night terror, and Xiao Hong, in fear, fled, causing his army to collapse without a battle. When Northern Wei forces next attacked the fortress of Zhongli (鍾離, in modern Bengbu as well), however, they were defeated by a Liang army commanded by Wei and Cao Jingzong (曹景宗) in spring 507, allowing Liang to keep Zhongli and effectively ending the war. After the Battle of Zhongli, there would continue to be border battles from time to time, but no large scale war for years.

In 511, when Emperor Wu received petition from an old peasant, who stopped him on the road when he was in the vicinity of Jiankang to offer sacrifices to heaven, that his criminal laws were too severe for the commoners (in particular, if one person committed a crime, the entire clan is punished), while being overly relaxing for officials and nobles, Emperor Wu considered revisions to the law. However, at the end, all he carried out was that criminals' clan members would not be required to undergo hard labor if they had seniors or children in their household, and he did not further reform his laws.

Starting in 514, Emperor Wu started carrying out a major construction project, downstream from Shouyang on the Huai River—a major dam that was intended to create a reservoir to flood Shouyang to allow Liang to capture the city. He started the project despite opposition from his engineers (who believed that the Huai River contained too much dirt in its water for a dam of the size necessary to be built). Despite engineering difficulties, however, the dam was successfully built by the general Kang Xuan (康絢) -- albeit at a major loss of life among the workers, due to the amount of work necessary and the diseases that occurred among them. (Zizhi Tongjian described the casualty rate to be at 70% to 80%.) Northern Wei's regent Empress Dowager Hu (who became regent over Emperor Xiaoming after Emperor Xuanwu's death in 515) sent armies commanded by Li Ping (李平) to attack Kang's escort forces, but could not damage the dam, which was finally completed in summer 516. it was described to be four and a half kilometers long, and the army pitched camp on the dam itself. Kang skillfully maintained the dam, and Shouyang began to be flooded. However, Emperor Wu recalled Kang to the capital and put the general Zhang Baozi (張豹子) in charge of the dam. Zhang, far less skillful and attentive than Kang, did not maintain the dam. With Huai River's water level greatly rising in winter 516, the dam collapsed, leading to more than 100,000 deaths downstream, and Shouyang was saved.

It is unclear when Emperor Wu began to be a devout Buddhist, but by 517 Buddhist influences on his policies began to be plain. That year, he ordered that imperial textile factories not weave gods and animals on clothes, because when the clothes undergo further manufacturing, the patterns might be damaged, showing disrespect to the gods and hurtfulness to the animals. In a further break from Confucian tradition, he considered making sacrifices to imperial ancestors vegetarian, instead of traditional animal sacrifices of goats, pigs, and cows, and the sacrifices were first changed to using dried meat, and then eventually to mock animals made from flour, vegetables, and fruits, and this change was despite popular opinion that this would bring displeasure from the ancestors.

== Middle Reign ==
In 522, Emperor Wu's nephew Xiao Zhengde—whom he had previously adopted but then unadopted when Xiao Tong was born—resentful that he was not created crown prince, fled to Northern Wei, claiming to be the deposed crown prince and requesting Northern Wei aid. However, Northern Wei did not take his claim seriously, and in 523 Xiao Zhengde fled back to Liang. Instead of punishing Xiao Zhengde, however, Emperor Wu merely rebuked him tearfully, and in fact restored him to his title of Marquess of Xifeng.

In winter 523, with his state plagued by forgeries of its copper coins, Emperor Wu abolished copper coins and started minting iron coins. (The actual fiscal impact of this act was unclear, but traditional Chinese historians generally considered iron to be unsuitable to use for coinage.)

In 524, Emperor Wu launched a number of attacks on Northern Wei's southern territory, with Northern Wei forces occupied with fighting agrarian rebellions to the north and west. Liang forces largely met little resistance. Further, in spring 525, the Northern Wei general Yuan Faseng (元法僧) surrendered the key city of Pengcheng (彭城, in modern Xuzhou, Jiangsu) to Liang. However, in summer 525, Emperor Wu's son Xiao Zong (蕭綜), who suspected that he was actually the son of Southern Qi's emperor Xiao Baojuan (because his mother Consort Wu was formerly Xiao Baojuan's concubine and had given birth to him only seven months after she became Emperor Wu's concubine), in turn surrendered Pengcheng to Northern Wei, ending Liang's advances in the northeast, although in summer 526, Shouyang fell to Liang troops after Emperor Wu successfully reemployed the damming strategy. For the next several years, Liang continued to make minor gains on the borders with Northern Wei.

Over the years, Emperor Wu had increasingly given additional authorities to Xiao Tong the Crown Prince, and the relationship between father and son was dear. However, in 526, after the death of Xiao Tong's mother Consort Ding Lingguang (丁令光), the relationship would deteriorate. Xiao Tong sought out an appropriate place to bury Consort Ding, but while he was doing so, a land owner bribed the eunuch Yu Sanfu (俞三副) into convincing Emperor Wu that that piece of land would bring good fortune for the emperor, and so Emperor Wu bought the land and buried Consort Ding there. However, once Consort Ding was buried, a Taoist monk informed Xiao Tong that he believed that the land would bring ill fortune for Consort Ding's oldest son—Xiao Tong. Xiao Tong therefore allowed the monk to bury a few items intended to dissolve the ill fortune, such as wax ducks, at the position reserved for the oldest son. Later on, when one of Xiao Tong's attendants, Bao Miaozhi (鮑邈之), was squeezed out of Xiao Tong's inner circles by another attendant, Wei Ya (魏雅), he, in resentment, reported to Emperor Wu that Wei had carried out sorcery on Xiao Tong's behalf. When Emperor Wu investigated, waxed ducks were found, and Emperor Wu became surprised and angry, and wanted to investigate further. He only stopped the investigation when he was advised to do so by the prime minister Xu Mian, executing only the Taoist monk who had suggested the burial of wax ducks. Xiao Tong became humiliated in the affair, and was never able to clear himself completely in his father's eyes.

In 527, Emperor Wu made his first offering of himself to the service of Buddha (捨身, sheshen) at Tongtai Monastery (同泰寺), spending three days there.

In 528, after a coup in Northern Wei, with the warlord Erzhu Rong overthrowing Empress Dowager Hu (after she killed her own son, Emperor Xiaoming of Northern Wei, with poison), a number of Northern Wei officials, including Yuan Yue (元悅) the Prince of Ru'nan, Yuan Yu (元彧) the Prince of Linhuai, and Yuan Hao the Prince of Beihai, fled to Liang, and a number of other officials surrendered territories they controlled to Liang. In winter 528, Emperor Wu created Yuan Hao the Prince of Wei—intending to have him lay claim to the Northern Wei throne and, if successful, become a Liang vassal—and commissioned his general Chen Qingzhi with an army to escort Yuan Hao back to Northern Wei. Despite the small size of Chen's army, he won battle after battle, and in spring 529, after Chen captured Suiyang (睢陽, in modern Shangqiu, Henan), Yuan Hao, with Emperor Wu's approval, proclaimed himself the emperor of Northern Wei. In summer 529, with Northern Wei troops unable to stand up to Chen, Emperor Xiaozhuang of Northern Wei fled the Northern Wei capital Luoyang, and Yuan Hao took it. However, Yuan Hao secretly wanted to rebel against Liang, and when Chen requested Emperor Wu to send reinforcements, Yuan Hao sent Emperor Wu a submission advising against it, and Emperor Wu, believing Yuan Hao, did not send additional troops. Soon, Erzhu Rong and Emperor Xiaozhuang counterattacked, and Luoyang fell. Yuan Hao fled and was killed in flight, and Chen's own army was destroyed, although Chen himself was able to flee back to Liang. Emperor Wu, realizing the impossibility of the task he gave Chen, nevertheless created Chen the Marquess of Yongxing in recognition of his victories.

In fall 529, Emperor Wu made his second offering of himself to the service of Buddha at Tongtai Monastery—but contrary to the first time he did, when he simply spent three days at the monastery, he stripped himself of imperial clothing and wore those of monks, and spent all day carrying out monastic tasks, including daily chores and giving of lectures on the Nirvana Sutra. He spent 12 days at the monastery, and returned to the palace only after the imperial offices made a huge donation to it—formally, to ransom "the Emperor Bodhisattva."

In 530, Emperor Wu made another attempt to establish a vassal regime in Northern Wei—by creating Yuan Yue the Prince of Wei, and commissioning Yuan Yue's uncle Fan Zun (范遵) with an army to escort Yuan Yue back to Northern Wei. Yuan Yue made some advances, particularly in light of the disturbance precipitated soon thereafter when Emperor Xiaozhuang ambushed and killed Erzhu Rong and was in turn overthrown by Erzhu Rong's nephew Erzhu Zhao and cousin Erzhu Shilong. However, Yuan Yue realized that the Erzhus then became firmly in control of Luoyang and that he would be unable to defeat them, and so returned to Liang in winter 530.

=== Xiao Tong's Death ===
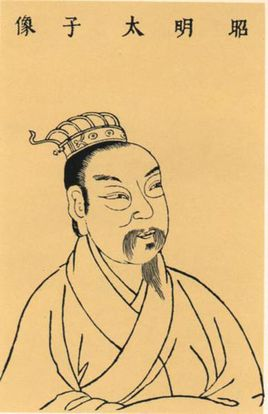
Xiao Tong.

In 531, Xiao Tong who was the Crown Prince at the time died, and Emperor Wu personally attended his wake and buried him in a tomb appropriate for an emperor. He also summoned Xiao Tong's oldest son, Xiao Huan (蕭歡) the Duke of Huarong back to the capital Jiankang, preparing to create Xiao Huan crown prince to replace his father, as would be appropriate under Confucian principles of succession. However, still resentful over the wax duck affair, he hesitated for days without carrying out the creation, and finally did not do so. Instead, against popular opinion, he created Xiao Tong's younger brother, also by Consort Ding, Xiao Gang crown prince. To compensate Xiao Tong's three sons, he created the princes of large commandery—Xiao Huan the Prince of Yuzhang, Xiao Yu (蕭譽) the Prince of Hedong, and Xiao Cha the Prince of Yueyang, but his grandsons continued to resent him.

In 532, with Northern Wei again in civil war after the general Gao Huan rose against the Erzhus, Emperor Wu again sent an army to escort Yuan Yue back to Northern Wei, and subsequently, Gao Huan welcomed Yuan Yue, but then decided against making Yuan Yue emperor. Subsequently, Emperor Xiaowu of Northern Wei, whom Gao made emperor, had Yuan Yue executed.

In 534, with Mars seen in the Dipper constellation—traditionally thought to be a sign that the emperor would be forced to leave the palace—Emperor Wu tried to divert the ill fortune by walking barefoot around his palace. However, he soon heard that Northern Wei's Emperor Xiaowu had fled Luoyang in a dispute with Gao splitting Northern Wei into two separate countries. Wu, both glad and embarrassed, stated, "Is it that even barbarians correspond to astrological signs?"

== Late reign ==
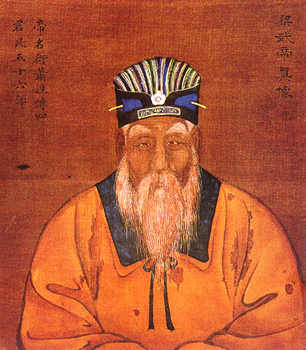
Emperor Wu in his late reign.

With Northern Wei divided into Eastern Wei and Western Wei in light of Emperor Xiaowu's flight, Emperor Wu initially continued to send his forces to make minor territorial gains on the borders, against both Eastern Wei and Western Wei, for several years. It had been the case throughout Emperor Wu's reign that he was overly lenient to his relatives and high-level officials, but the trend appeared to become more severe late in his reign. His sons, all imperial princes, also grew increasingly disobedient of central authority, often acting as de facto emperors within their provincial domains.

In 535, the Liang general, Lan Qin led a successful expedition to conquer the Hanzhong region and forced the Western Wei to sue for peace. The Volcanic winter of 536 saw "a yellow ash-like substance" rain from the sky in large amounts. (Note: The effects of the volcanic winter seemed to have reached Liang territory the following year; there were hailstorms in Qingzhou in late summer that year, followed by snow in the region in early autumn. There was also food shortages throughout the year.) By 537, Emperor Wu was also at a détente with Eastern Wei, and ambassadors from both states often visited the other. With Eastern Wei and Western Wei locked into war, Liang was largely at peace. With Zhou She having died in 524 and Xu Mian having died in 535, Emperor Wu largely entrusted the government to Zhu Yi and He Jingrong (何敬容). While He was known for integrity, he lacked political skills, and Zhu became the de facto prime minister, wielding great power and amassing wealth. While Zhu was skillful and capable, he was also regarded as corrupt and jealous of others. His hold on power was particularly increased when He was dismissed in 544 over a corruption scandal involving the brother of his concubine.

In 539, based on Zhu's recommendation, Emperor Wu carried out a reorganization of the provincial divisions, placing the provinces into five classes based on their sizes and populations. After the reorganization, there were 108 provinces in total (20 of the first class, 10 of the second class, eight of the third class, 23 of the fourth class, and 21 of the fifth class), with the smaller provinces often consisting of single villages in southern and southwestern border regions.

In 541, the Vietnamese people of Jiao Province (交州, roughly modern Hanoi, Vietnam), dissatisfied at the cruel rule of the governor Xiao Zi (蕭諮) the Marquess of Wulin (Emperor Wu's nephew), declared a rebellion, led by Lý Bôn. The Liang forces could not put down Lý Bôn's rebellion quickly, and Lý Bôn eventually declared himself emperor of Vietnam in 544, fighting a guerilla war with Liang. Liang forces would not be driven out until 550.

In 545, Emperor Wu's official He Chen (賀琛) wrote a submission Emperor Wu to correct four matters—the corruption of officials, the wastefulness in the luxurious style of living among officials and the population at large, the harshness of penal laws, and the overspending on construction projects (mostly temples). Emperor Wu was exceedingly angry and rejected He's suggestions. Commenting on this incident, the historian Sima Guang wrote the following about Emperor Wu:

The emperor was filially pious, loving, humble, frugal, knowledgeable, and good at writing. He extensively studied mysticism, astrology, horseriding, archery, music, calligraphy, and weiqi. He worked hard, and even in the coldest winter times, he would get up at the fourth watch [between 3:00 a.m. and 4:00 a.m.] to review important matters of state, and as his pen-wielding hand is exposed to the cold air, his skin would break. Ever since the era of Tianjian [from 502 to 519], he became a Buddhist and ate only vegetarian meals, not meat, and his single daily meal only contained vegetables and rough rice grains. Sometimes, when he was busy, he would flush his mouth and no longer eat after noon. He wore cloth and used bed covers made of bombax ceiba. Each hat he wore, he would use for three years, and each comforter he used, he would use for two years. Within the palace, starting from Guifei [first-ranked consort], their skirts would not be long enough to reach the ground. The emperor disliked alcohol, and unless he was offering sacrifices to the ancestors, feasting with the imperial officials, or holding Buddhist ceremonies, he used no music. Even when he was alone in a dark room, he wore proper clothing and sat carefully. No matter how hot the weather was, he would not peel up his sleeves or expose his arms. He treated palace servants as honored guests. However, he was overly lenient to the officials. The provincial and commandery governors often extracted wealth from the people. The messengers that he sent out to the locales often improperly pressured, criticized, or extorted from the locales. He trusted evil people and liked to criticize people for minor faults. He built many Buddhist towers and temples, inflicting great burdens on the government and the people. The area south of the Yangtze River had long peace, and as a result became wasteful in lifestyle. All of what He Chen said was true, but it was particularly because what he said was true that the emperor became angry.

In 546, Emperor Wu made his third offering of himself to the service of the Buddha. He spent more than a month at Tongtai Temple, before a fire that destroyed the temple tower caused him to return to the palace.

== The Hou Jing disturbance and death ==
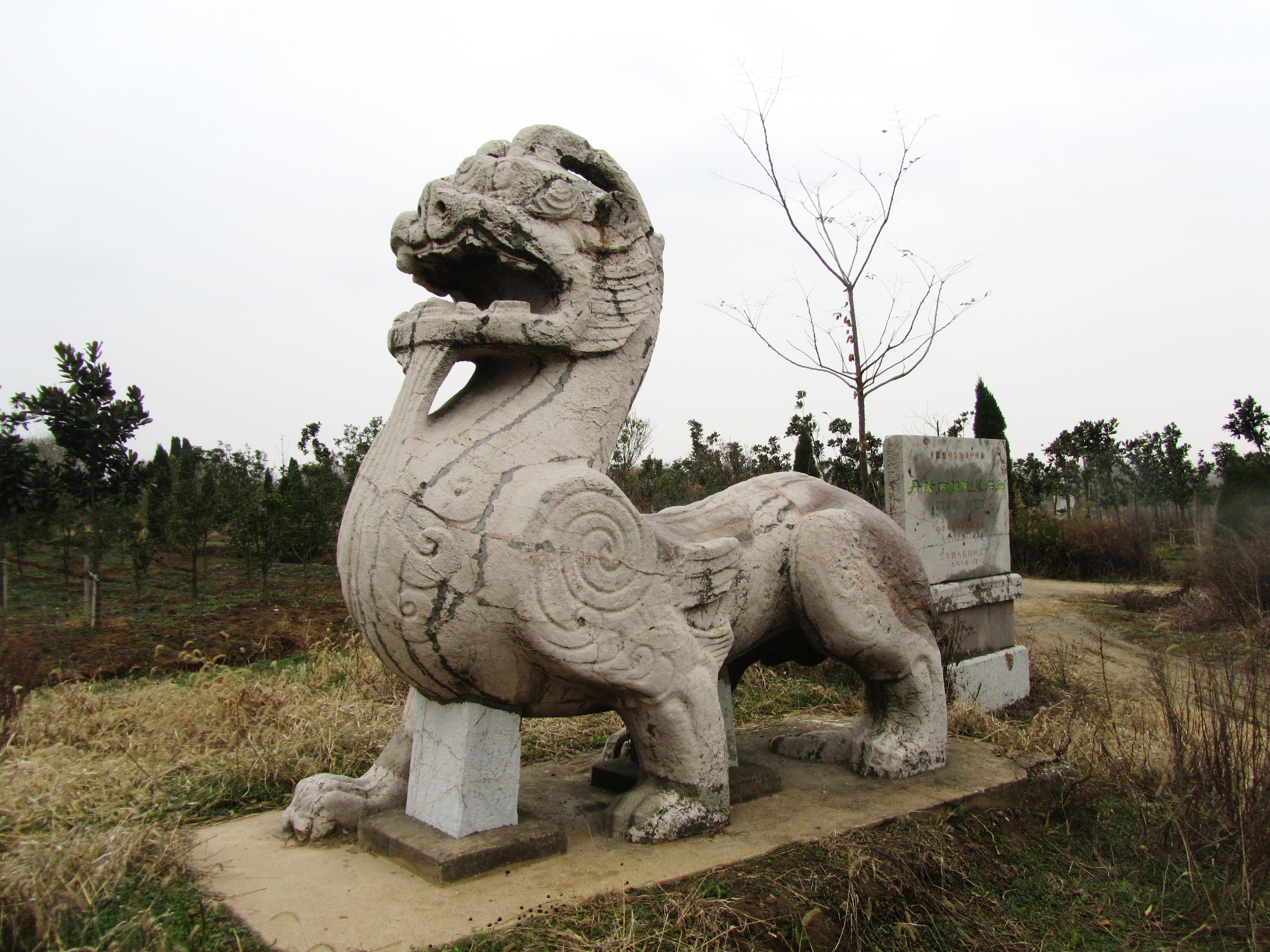
The tianlu for the imperial tomb of Xiao Yan

In 547, Gao Huan died, and was succeeded as the paramount authority in Eastern Wei by his son Gao Cheng. The Eastern Wei general Hou Jing, because he disliked the young Gao Cheng and considered himself superior, rebelled. He first surrendered the 13 provinces that he was in charge—all south of the Yellow River and north of the Huai River, to Western Wei, but believing that he would also not be tolerated by Western Wei's paramount general Yuwen Tai, Hou then surrendered nine of the 13 provinces (minus the four that he had turned over to Western Wei forces in exchange for help) to Liang.

Emperor Wu initially hesitated himself at whether to accept Hou's surrender, particularly because a number of his officials, including Xie Ju (謝舉), opposed, citing the long-standing peace with Eastern Wei. Zhu Yi, however, believing that approving of Hou's surrender would please Emperor Wu, argued that Hou should be accepted. Emperor Wu agreed, and he created Hou the Prince of He'nan, with acting imperial powers over the nine provinces. In the midst of this situation, Emperor Wu, while sending troops to aid Hou, offered himself to the service of the Buddha for the fourth time, spending 37 days at Tongtai Temple and only returning to the palace after his officials made another huge donation to Tongtai Temple.

Hou, with aid from Western Wei and Liang, initially stood Eastern Wei attacks. However, when Yuwen subsequently demanded that he proceed to the Western Wei capital Chang'an to greet Emperor Wen of Western Wei, Hou turned against Western Wei forces commanded by Wang Sizheng, although Western Wei largely held the cities that he had turned over. Meanwhile, Emperor Wu also commissioned a large army, commanded by his nephew Xiao Yuanming the Marquess of Zhenyang, to attack Eastern Wei to the east. By Emperor Wu's orders, Xiao Yuanming advanced to Hanshan (寒山), in Pengcheng's vicinity, to build a dam over the Si River (泗水) to use water to attack Pengcheng. Xiao Yuanming's lieutenant, the general Yang Kan, quickly completed the dam, but when Yang advised Xiao Yuanming to attack Pengcheng, Xiao Yuanming hesitated. Meanwhile, Eastern Wei forces commanded by Murong Shaozong arrived near Hanshan, and Yang advised Xiao Yuanming to attack them while they were still tired, but Xiao Yuanming failed to. Subsequently, when the armies engaged, the Liang forces were initially successful, but overextended themselves, and the Eastern Wei counterattack nearly destroyed the entire Liang army, capturing Xiao Yuanming and many of his officers.

Murong then turned his attention against Hou, meeting Hou at Woyang (渦陽, in modern Bozhou, Anhui). Initially, Hou defeated Murong in battle, forcing him to flee, but Murong then regrouped. Meanwhile, Hou's food supplies began to dwindle. In spring 548, Hou's troops collapsed, and he approached Shouyang. When the Wei An (韋黯), the acting governor of Southern Yu Province (南豫州, modern central Anhui) welcomed Hou, Hou took him by surprise and seized Shouyang. He then sent an apology to Emperor Wu, and Emperor Wu, not having the heart of forcing Hou away from Shouyang, made him the governor of Southern Yu Province.

With Eastern Wei having recovered all nine of the provinces that Hou had surrendered to Liang, Gao Cheng now sent overtures to Emperor Wu, requesting that peace be reinstated, offering to return Xiao Yuanming and Hou's relatives. Hou opposed peace, suspecting Gao Cheng's intentions, and he also did not trust Emperor Wu's subsequent guarantees never to betray him. Hou's fears were further increased when Emperor Wu sent ambassadors to mourn Gao Huan. Hou decided to test Emperor Wu by forging a letter from Gao Cheng, offering to swap Xiao Yuanming for Hou—and when Emperor Wu then responded, "If you return Yuanming in the morning, I will return Hou Jing in the evening" against the advice of Fu Qi (傅岐), Hou was outraged. Hou made an overture to Xiao Zhengde, promising to support him as the new emperor, and Xiao Zhengde agreed. Emperor Wu's nephew Xiao Fan (蕭範) the Prince of Poyang, who believed that Hou was about to rebel, suggested a preemptory attack, but Zhu advised against it, and Emperor Wu took no action on Xiao Fan's recommendation. In summer 548, Hou finally declared a rebellion, claiming that his goal was to clear the court of evil officials—Zhu, Xu Lin (徐麟), Lu Yan (陸驗), and Zhou Shizhen (周石珍) -- all corrupt officials that the people hated.

Initially, Emperor Wu did not take Hou's rebellion seriously, and he made the comment, "I can break off a tree branch and kill him with it." He sent his son Xiao Guan (蕭綸) the Prince of Shaoling to command a four-pronged army, intending to trap Hou at Shouyang, but Hou, taking decisive action, marched toward Jiankang before Xiao Guan's forces could converge, and within a month, he crossed the Yangtze and approached Jiankang, catching the city unprepared. When Emperor Wu sent Xiao Zhengde to resist Hou, Xiao Zhengde turned against Emperor Wu and served as Hou's guide. Hou quickly surrounded Jiankang, and the populace of Jiankang, unaccustomed to war, panicked and collapsed. Emperor Wu and Xiao Gang put together the imperial guards to defend the palace, and initially, the defenses held, particularly because the key general, Yang Kan, was capable. In winter 548, Hou had Xiao Zhengde declared emperor and married Xiao Zhengde's daughter. When Hou's forces began to run out of food supply, he allowed his soldiers to pillage from the people, and the people began to starve in large numbers. (In the siege, the vegetables that Emperor Wu was accustomed to eat ran out, and Emperor Wu became forced to eat eggs.)

The provincial governors, led by Xiao Guan and Xiao Yi the Prince of Xiangdong, meanwhile, were beginning to put a relief force together, and Xiao Guan arrived around the new year 549, but was defeated by Hou and was unable to lift the siege. Meanwhile, Yang died, and the people inside the palace walls grew increasingly desperate. As the siege went on, however, more Liang provincial forces converged, and they supported Liu Zhongli (柳仲禮) the governor of Si Province (司州, modern southern Henan) as their commander. Liu initially had some successes against Hou's forces, but in spring 549, Hou made a surprise attack on Liu's forces, and both sides incurred heavy losses, with Liu himself nearly dying of his injuries—after which, Liu became extremely hesitant to engage Hou. Liu grew very arrogant as well, even treating Xiao Guan was disrespect. Further, Liu's forces were pillaging the people as much as Hou's forces, and therefore the people saw no incentive to assist them.

With Hou's forces tired, however, Hou sued for peace, stating that he was willing to return to Shouyang if Emperor Wu was willing to cede four provinces west of the Yangtze River to him and willing to send Xiao Gang's oldest son Xiao Daqi the Prince of Xuancheng as a hostage. Emperor Wu agreed—except for sending Xiao Daqi's younger brother Xiao Dakuan (蕭大款) the Duke of Shicheng instead of Xiao Daqi. Once the relief forces withdrew slightly (under Hou's demand) and Hou's forces had rested about 15 days and obtained some additional food supplies, however, Hou changed his mind and decided not to withdraw after all. He resumed sieging the palace, and yet Liu took no actions. In late spring 549, the palace fell to Hou's troops, and Hou met Emperor Wu, initially acting as if he were willing to remain a faithful subject. Hou remained formally deferential to Emperor Wu and Xiao Gang the Crown Prince, but meanwhile effectively put them under house arrest. He issued an edict in Emperor Wu's name, disbanding Liu's forces, and Liu did so. Hou also deposed Xiao Zhengde.

Meanwhile, Emperor Wu continued to resist some of Hou's demands, and when Hou requested that certain of his associates by named to high-level posts, Emperor Wu refused. Hou reacted by reducing Emperor Wu's supplies, and in summer 549, Emperor Wu died. (It is unclear whether he died from illness or from starvation.) It was recorded that as he was dying, his mouth was bitter, and he wanted honey, but no one responded to his request. Hou allowed Xiao Gang to take the throne (as Emperor Jianwen) to succeed him.

== Buddhist legends ==
Emperor Wu is remembered by many Buddhists today for the many contributions he gave to the faith. There are a few stories that revolve around his involvement with Buddhism.

Emperor Wu features in the first case of the Blue Cliff Record. Imperial officials disapproved of the dialogue recited in the first case, viewing it as against the dignity of the throne.

== Family ==
- Empress Wude, of the Xi clan of Gaoping (武德皇后 高平郗氏; 468–499), personal name Hui (徽)
  - Princess Yongxing (永興公主; d. 529), personal name Yuyao (玉姚), first daughter
    - Married Yin Jun (殷均)
  - Princess Yongshi (永世公主), personal name Yuwan (玉婉)
    - Married Xie Mo of Chen (陳郡 謝謨), a son of Xie Tiao
    - Married Wang Yin of Langya (琊瑯 王𬤇)
  - Princess Yongkang (永康公主), personal name Yuhuan (玉嬛)
- Empress Dowager Mu, of the Ding clan (穆皇太后 丁氏; 484–526), personal name Lingguang (令光)
  - Xiao Tong, Emperor Zhaoming (昭明皇帝 蕭統; 501–531), first son
  - Xiao Gang, Emperor Jianwen (簡文皇帝 蕭綱; 503–551), third son
  - Xiao Xu, Prince Wei of Luling (廬陵威王 蕭續; 506–547), fifth son
- Empress Dowager Wenxuan, of the Ruan clan (文宣皇太后 阮氏; 477–542), personal name Lingying (令嬴)
  - Xiao Yi, Emperor Yuan (元皇帝 蕭繹; 508–555), seventh son
- Shuyuan, of the Wu clan (敬淑媛 吳氏; d. 527), personal name Jinghui (景暉)
  - Xiao Zan, Prince of Yuzhang (豫章王 蕭贊; 502–531), second son, adopted
- Shuyi, of the Dong clan (淑儀 董氏)
  - Xiao Ji, Prince Jian of Nankang (南康簡王 蕭績; 505–529), fourth son
- Chonghua, of the Ding clan (充華 丁氏)
  - Xiao Lun, Prince Xie of Shaoling (邵陵攜王 蕭綸; 507–551), sixth son
- Xiurong, of the Ge clan (修容 葛氏)
  - Xiao Ji, Prince Zhenxian of Wuling (武陵貞獻王 蕭紀; 508–553), eighth son
- Unknown
  - Princess Anji (安吉公主), personal name Yuzhi (玉娡)
    - Married Wang Shi of Langya, Duke Jiancheng (琊瑯 王實)
  - Princess Dao of Fuyang (富陽悼公主), fourth daughter
    - Married Zhang Zuan of Fanyang (范陽 張纘; 499–549), and had issue (two sons, two daughters)
  - Princess Changcheng (長城公主), personal name Yuling (玉姈)
    - Married Liu Yan of Hedong (河東 柳偃; d. 550), and had issue (one child, Lady Liu)
  - Princess Yongjia (永嘉公主)
    - Married Wang Quan of Langya (琊瑯 王銓)

== Genealogy ==
- Xiao Zheng (萧整)
  - Xiao Juan (萧隽)
    - Xiao Lezi (萧乐子)
      - Xiao Chengzhi (萧承之)
        - Xiao Daocheng
  - Xiao Xia (萧辖)
    - Xiao Fuzi (萧副子)
      - Xiao Daoci (萧道赐)
        - Xiao Shunzhi (萧顺之)
          - Xiao Yan

== See also ==
- Six-Dynasty Juniper

== Notes ==
Chinese royalty
New dynasty	Emperor of Liang Dynasty; 502–549	Succeeded by Emperor Jianwen of Liang
Preceded by Emperor He of Southern Qi	Emperor of China (Southern); 502–549	Succeeded by Emperor Jianwen of Liang
