= 470s =

Decade

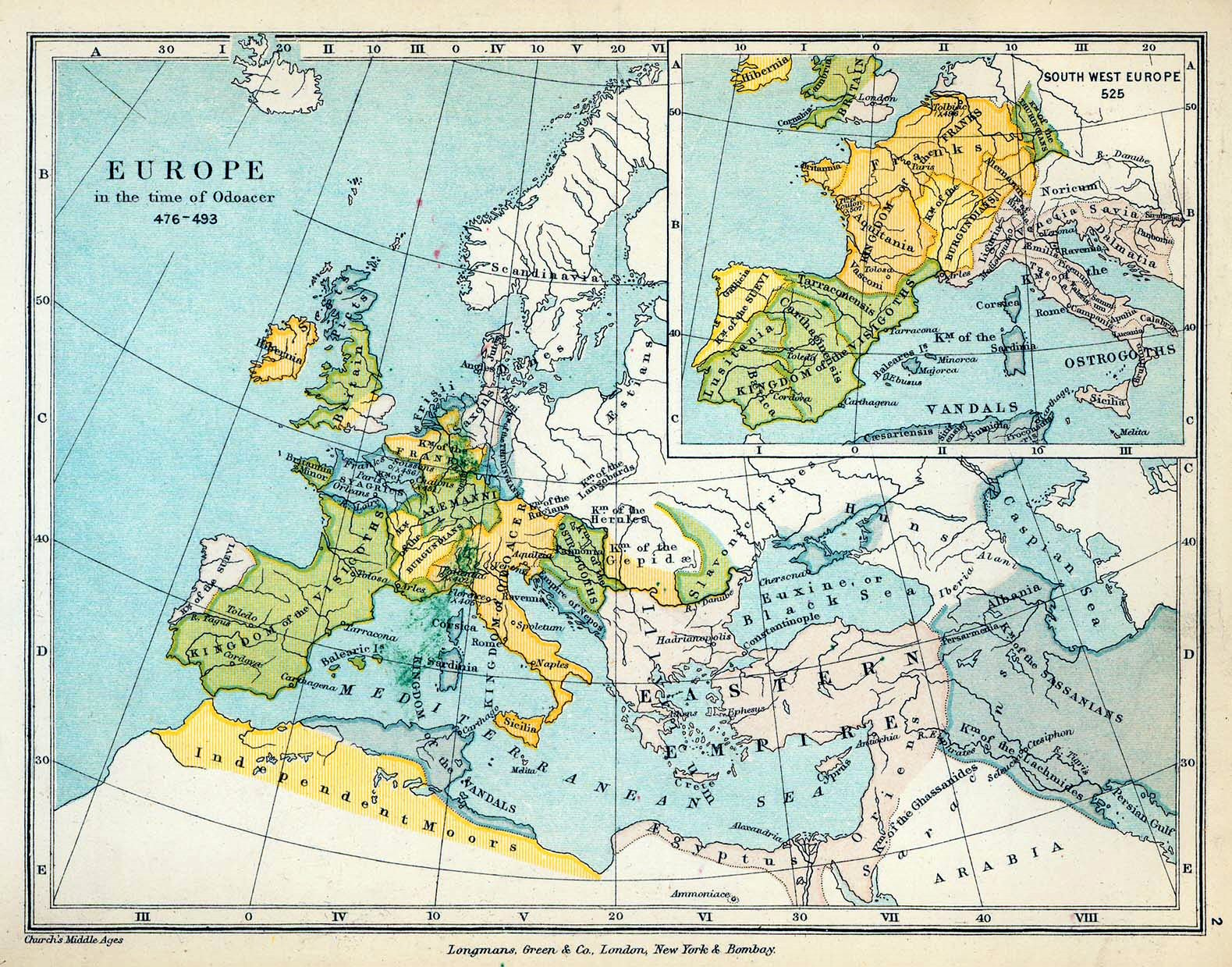
Europe in the 470s

The 470s decade ran from January 1, 470, to December 31, 479.

== Events ==
=== By place ===
==== Roman Empire ====
- Revolt of Euric: Roman forces under Paulus and Childeric I stop the Aquitanian Goths at Bourges and briefly recaptured Tours in 470. All the loot they had stolen fell into the hands of Paul.
- The Roman general Paulus is killed shortly afterwards at Angers.
- The church of Santo Stefano Rotondo at Rome is consecrated (approximate date).

==== Europe ====
- Odoacer becomes the leader of the Germanic tribes (Herulic – Scirian foederati) in Northern Italy (approximate date).

=== By topic ===
==== Religion ====
- Mamertus, bishop of Vienne, introduces the Rogation days (a three days' procession involving prayer to invoke God's mercy).

=== By place ===
==== Roman Empire ====
- Basiliscus, brother-in-law of Emperor Leo I, returns from exile (see 468) and leads an imperial conspiracy against Aspar (magister militum), helping in his murder at Constantinople.

==== Britannia ====
- The army of King Ceretic of Strathclyde raids the Irish coast, carries off some of Saint Patrick's followers, and sells them into slavery (approximate date).

==== Europe ====
- Revolt of Euric: The Aquitanian Goths under Euric defeat a Roman army that was sent by Emperor Anthemius near Arles and conquer a large part of the Provence (Southern Gaul). The city of Clermont-Ferrand in Auvergne is besieged.
- The Goths, led by Theodoric Strabo, revolt in Thrace after the assassination of Aspar. Leo I sends Basiliscus to suppress the uprising.
- Theodoric the Great, age 17, succeeds his father Theodemir as king of the Ostrogoths, settling his people in lower Moesia (Balkans).

==== Asia ====
- Northern Wei ruler Xianwen officially goes into retirement. His son, Xiao Wen Di, aged 4, becomes the new emperor, initially under the regency of Emperor Xianwen's stepmother Empress Dowager Feng.

=== By topic ===
==== Religion ====
- Acacius becomes patriarch of Constantinople, succeeding Gennadius I.

=== By place ===
==== Roman Empire ====
- The Western Roman Empire enters a period of unrest. Relations between Ricimer, de facto ruler, and Emperor Anthemius deteriorate completely. Epiphanius, bishop of Pavia, negotiates a peace agreement.
- July 11 – Anthemius, besieged in the part of Rome he controls until his troops are defeated, is caught while fleeing the city disguised as a supplicant in the Old St. Peter's Basilica (or at the church of Santa Maria in Trastevere), and later beheaded by Gundobad or Ricimer. Ricimer proclaims Olybrius emperor. Ricimer's nephew, the Burgundian general Gundobad, assumes command of the Western army and holds de facto power in the Empire.
- August 18 – Ricimer dies at his palace of malignant fever, vomiting blood.
- November 2 – Olybrius dies of dropsy. During his four months' rule he has been mainly interested in religion.
- Mount Vesuvius erupts. During the volcanic eruption the whole of southern Europe is blanketed by ash.

=== By place ===
==== Roman Empire ====
- March 3 – Gundobad (nephew of Ricimer) nominates Glycerius as emperor of the Western Roman Empire. Emperor Leo I refuses to recognize him, and chooses Julius Nepos as candidate to the Western throne.
- October 25 – Leo I grants his grandson Leo II, age 6, the title of Caesar (approximate date).

==== Balkans ====
- Theodoric Strabo signs a peace treaty with Leo I, and according to the terms the Goths are paid with an annual tribute of 2,000 pounds of gold. Leo gives him an independent state in Thrace and he obtains the rank of magister militum.
- The Ostrogoths leave Pannonia, and migrate to Macedonia and Moesia, from whence they ravage the Balkans.

==== Europe ====
- King Euric orders the invasion of Italy, but is defeated by Glycerius. The Visigoths withdraw to Gaul, and conquer the cities of Arles and Marseille.
- Gundobad returns to Burgundy, where his father Gondioc has died, and becomes king of the Burgundians.

=== By place ===
==== Roman Empire ====
- January 18 – Emperor Leo I dies of dysentery at Constantinople, after a 17-year reign. He is succeeded by his 7-year-old grandson Leo II, who briefly becomes ruler of the Byzantine Empire.
- February 9 – Zeno, father of Leo II, is crowned as co-emperor (Augustus). He rules the empire together with his son, and stabilises the Eastern frontier.
- June 24 – Julius Nepos arrives at Portus, and marches on Ravenna. He forces Glycerius to abdicate the throne, and proclaims himself emperor of the Western Roman Empire.
- Glycerius is exiled to Dalmatia (Balkans) and becomes bishop of Salona. Neither the Senate nor the Gallo-Roman aristocracy decide to resist, and Nepos accepts the imperial purple.
- November 17 – Leo II dies of an unknown disease (possibly poisoned by his mother Ariadne), after a reign of 10 months. Zeno becomes sole Eastern Emperor.
- Winter – Zeno sends an embassy, to conclude a peace with King Genseric. He succeeds in an agreement with the Vandals, to secure the commercial routes in the Mediterranean.

=== By topic ===
==== Art ====
- A statue of a Standing Buddha from Sarnath, Uttar Pradesh, (during the Gupta period) is made. It is now kept at the Sarnath Museum in India (source states the creation date as 1st to 2nd century BCE).

=== By place ===
==== Roman Empire ====
- Spring - Spanish War of Euric: The comes Hispaniarum Vincentius capitulates against the Aquitanian Goths; Euric completes his conquest of Spain.
- January 9 – Emperor Zeno abdicates under pressure, as his wife's uncle Basiliscus stages a coup d'état at Constantinople, with support from Zeno's trusted adviser and fellow Isaurian Illus. Basiliscus usurps the throne and is proclaimed new emperor (Augustus) of the Eastern Roman Empire. He begins a 20-month reign; Zeno and his supporters flee to Isauria.
- April 9 – Basiliscus issues a circular letter (Enkyklikon) to the bishops of his empire, promoting the Miaphysite christological position. These religious views will make him highly unpopular.
- Summer – Emperor Julius Nepos grants the Visigoth King Euric legal tenure of his conquests, which include Provence (region of Gaul), in exchange for full independence.
- August 28 – Magister Militum Orestes takes control of the government in Ravenna, and forces Julius Nepos to flee to Dalmatia.
- October 31 – Romulus Augustus is installed as emperor by his father Orestes, who becomes regent in effect of the Western Roman Empire. Augustus will ultimately rule for 10 months, as the last Western Emperor.

==== Asia ====
- Bodhidharma, Buddhist monk, travels to China and, begins teaching the Laṅkāvatāra Sūtra (approximate date).
- Gongju becomes the capital of Baekje, and is threatened by Goguryeo, who conquers the Han River valley (Korea).
- Munju becomes king of Baekje.

==== Byzantine Empire ====
- Great fire in Constantinople with loss of Palace of Lausus and - along with it - the famous Zeus from Olympia.

=== By topic ===
==== Art ====
- A Bodhisattva (detail of a wall painting in the Ajanta Caves) in Maharashtra (India) of the Gupta period) is made (approximate date).

==== Religion ====
- The compilation of the Babylonian Talmud, the source of the majority of Jewish Halakha, is completed.
- The Church of Saint Simeon Stylites is consecrated in Syria.

=== By place ===
==== Roman Empire ====
- Summer – Odoacer, chieftain of the Germanic tribes (Herulic/Scirian foederati), visits the imperial palace at Ravenna. He petitions Orestes (magister militum) to reward his mercenaries for their services and their support of his rebellion a year earlier, by making good on his promise to grant them lands to settle permanently in Italy. Orestes refuses this proposal and Odoacer leads his tribesmen in a revolt.
- August – Basiliscus, Roman usurper, is deposed and Zeno is restored as emperor of the Eastern Roman Empire. With the support of his adviser Illus, he besieges Constantinople, but the Senate opens the gates, allowing him to resume the throne. Basiliscus flees to sanctuary in a church, but surrenders himself and his family after extracting a solemn promise from Zeno not to shed their blood. Basiliscus is sent to a fortress in Cappadocia, where he later dies from starvation.
- August 23 – Odoacer, age 43, is proclaimed rex Italiae ("king of Italy") by his troops. He leads his Ostrogoth army into the Po Valley, and advances to Ravenna while plundering the countryside.
- August 28 – Orestes is arrested by Odoacer near Piacenza, and swiftly executed.
- September 4 – Romulus Augustulus, Roman usurper of the Western Roman Empire, is deposed by Odoacer at Ravenna. Odoacer spares the boy's life and gives him a pension of 6,000 solidi, but exiles him to the "Castellum Lucullanum" (Castel dell'Ovo), on the island of Megaride in the Gulf of Naples. This event will later be romanticized in Western literature and history as the Fall of Western Rome, and is traditionally used by historians to mark the beginning of the European Middle Ages.
- Julius Nepos, de jure ruler, becomes legally the last "Western Roman Emperor". He governs Dalmatia (Balkans), Morocco, and Northwest Gaul until his death in 480, but has no effective power on the Italian Peninsula.
- Odoacer crosses the Maritime Alps with a Gothic army and invades Provence (Southern Gaul). He conquers the cities of Arles and Marseille, after a victorious battle against the Burgundians.
- The Visigoths under King Euric march into Italy, and suffer defeat against the forces of Odoacer. Emperor Zeno concludes a peace treaty between the Goths and Odoacer surrenders the newly conquered territory in Gaul. Euric pledges himself to undertake no further hostilities.
- The Roman Senate petitions Zeno to recognize Nepos as deposed and take the sole emperorship himself, abolishing the 81-year-long east/west division of the empire and recognizing Odoacer's authority in Italy. Zeno declines the first request, but names Odoacer Patricius, investing his rule with Imperial legitimacy.
- Winter – Zeno recognizes the full extent of the Vandal Kingdom, including all of western Africa, the Balearic Islands, Corsica, Sardinia and Sicily. King Gaiseric gives Sicily, with the exception of the city of Lilybaeum, to Odoacer in return for tribute.

==== India ====
- The birth of Aryabhata is traditionally regarded as the beginning of the classical period of Indian mathematics and astronomy.

==== China ====
- Xian Wen Di, Retired Emperor of Northern Wei, is murdered by Empress Feng. She assumes regency over the young Xiao Wen Di.

=== By topic ===
==== Religion ====
- Peter the Fuller is restored as patriarch of Antioch.

=== By place ===
==== Africa ====
- January 25 – Genseric, ruler of the Vandal Kingdom, dies a natural death at Carthage, and is succeeded by his eldest son Huneric. He maintains control over the islands in the western Mediterranean Sea with his Vandal fleet, and rescinds his father's policy of persecuting the Roman Catholics in Africa.
- The independent Mauro-Roman Kingdom (Kingdom of the Moors and Romans) is formed by Christian Berbers in the Roman province of Mauretania Caesariensis (present-day northern Algeria), bordering the Vandal Kingdom to the east.

==== Europe ====
- Aelle, first king of the South Saxons, lands on the Sussex coast of England with his three sons near Cymenshore, according to the Anglo-Saxon Chronicle. The Britons engage him upon landing, but his superior force besieges them at Pevensey and drives them into the wood called Andredes leage. Over the next nine years, Saxon coastal holdings are gradually expanded.

==== Byzantine Empire ====
- Armatus, Byzantine military commander (magister militum), is killed by order of emperor Zeno, being murdered by his own friend Onoulphus after supporting the rebellion of his uncle Basiliscus in 475.

==== China ====
- Liu Zhun, age 10, becomes Emperor Shun of the Liu Song dynasty after his brother Houfei is assassinated by general Xiao Daocheng. He installs Shun as puppet ruler and sets himself up as regent. Xiao receives near-imperial powers, establishes Buddhism as the state religion and sets up the "Three Leaders" system, under which native hamlet, village and district officers are responsible for taxation and conscription.
- Shaolin Monastery is founded (according to the Continued Biographies of Eminent Monks (645) by Daoxuan; the monastery is built on the north side of Shaoshi Mountain, the western peak of Mount Song, one of the four Sacred Mountains of China, by emperor Xiao Wen Di of the Northern Wei dynasty in 477. Yang Xuanzhi, in the Record of the Buddhist Monasteries of Luoyang (547), and Li Xian, in the Ming Yitongzhi (1461), concur with Daoxuan's location and attribution. For alternate founding date, see 495 or 497).
- Earliest date for the oldest known painted depiction of a horse collar, on a cave mural of Dunhuang, during the Northern Wei dynasty.

==== Asia ====
- Samgeun becomes king of the Korean kingdom of Baekje.

=== By place ===
==== Europe ====
- Verina, mother-in-law of Eastern Roman Emperor Zeno, attempts to kill Isaurian general Illus for turning against her brother Basiliscus. A major revolt is led by her son-in-law Marcian and the Ostrogoth warlord Theodoric Strabo, but Illus again proves his loyalty to Zeno by quashing the revolt in 479.

==== Asia ====
- The first Shinto shrines are built in Japan.
- The Liu Song dynasty ends in China.
- Chinese chronicles record a memorial sent by the "King of Japan" (possibly Yūryaku), who describes himself as "Supreme Director of Military Affairs in Japan and Korea" to the Court of the Northern Wei Dynasty. The Chinese emperor responds by confirming the Japanese dynasty in those titles. This is the earliest verifiable date in Japanese history.

=== By place ===
==== Britannia ====
- Ambrosius Aurelianus, war leader of the Romano-British, is proclaimed king of the Britons (according to Historia Regum Britanniae). He rules probably in the south of Britain, and continues the war against the Anglo-Saxons.

==== Europe ====
- King Theodoric the Great starts a 4-year campaign against the Byzantine Empire. The Ostrogoths ravage the Roman provinces (Moesia and Thrace), and threaten the capital of Constantinople itself.
- Julius Nepos, former emperor of the Western Roman Empire, plans military campaigns in Dalmatia against Odoacer, hoping to regain control of Italy himself.

==== Asia ====
- Summer – The Liu Song dynasty ends and the Southern Qi dynasty begins in southern China. Emperor Shun Di is forced to abandon the throne and Qi Gao Di becomes the first ruler of Southern Qi. Later former Emperor Shun and empress Wang Zhenfeng are killed by the imperial guard, near the vicinity of the capital Jiankang.
- As Lý Trường Nhân, Jiaozhou's governor, died in final days of the Liu Song dynasty, Lý Thúc Hiến requested the Liu Song to be appointed as Trường Nhân's successor. The Liu Song rejected Thúc Hiến's request and appointed Thẩm Hoán, the governor of Nanhai Commandery, as the new governor of Jiaozhou, while Thúc Hiến was assigned to govern Vũ Bình and Tân Xương. However, with strong support from the local population, Thúc Hiến deployed troops throughout the region, preventing Thẩm Hoán from assuming office in Jiaozhou. As a result, Thẩm Hoán was forced to remain in Uất Lâm during the turbulent final days of the Liu Song dynasty, where he eventually died.
- In July, emperor Qi Gao Di granted permission for Lý Thúc Hiến to continue his rule over Jiaozhou as its state governor.
- Dongseong becomes king of the Korean kingdom of Baekje.
- Soji becomes king of the Korean kingdom of Silla.

== Births ==
470

- Buddhapālita, Indian Madhyamaka scholar (d. 550)
- Caesarius, bishop of Arles (or 469; d. 542)
- Dionysius Exiguus, inventor of the Anno Domini era (approximate date)
- Endelienta, Welsh princess and saint (approximate date)
- Ferreolus of Rodez, Roman senator (approximate date)
- Finnian of Clonard, Irish monastic saint (d. 549)
- approximate date – Pope John I

472

- Emilian of Cogolla, Iberic abbot and saint (approximate date)

473

- Xiao Zhaoye, Chinese emperor of Southern Qi (known as the Prince of Yulin) (d. 494)
- Kavad I, king (shah) of the Sasanian Empire from 488 to 531, with an interruption of two years

474

- Abraham of Kratia, Christian monk, saint (approximate date)
- Anthemius of Tralles, Greek architect, mathematician (approximate date)
- Clotilde, Christian wife of Clovis I, ancestress of the succeeding Merovingian kings (Approximate date) (d.545)
- Magnus Felix Ennodius, bishop, Latin poet (approximate date)

475

- Íte of Killeedy, Irish nun (approximate date)
- Ferreolus of Rodez, Roman senator (approximate date)

476

- December – Aryabhata, Indian mathematician and astronomer (d. 550)
- Hilary of Galeata, Christian monk and saint (d. 558)

478

- Narses, Byzantine general (d. 573)

479

- Ruan Xiaoxu, bibliography writer (d. 536)

== Deaths ==
470

- K'inich Popol Hol, king of the Maya city of Copán
- Romanus, Roman usurper in the West Roman Empire (executed)

471

- August 25 – Gennadius I, patriarch of Constantinople
- Ardabur, Roman general and son of Aspar
- Aspar, Alan patrician and general (magister militum)
- Eudocia, Vandal queen and daughter of Valentinian III (approximate date)
- Julius Patricius, Roman general and son of Aspar (approximate date)

472

- July 11 – Anthemius, emperor of the Western Roman Empire
- August 18 – Ricimer, de facto ruler of the Western Roman Empire
- Ming Di, Chinese emperor of the Liu Song dynasty (b. 439)
- Olybrius, emperor of the Western Roman Empire

473

- Euthymius the Great, abbot and bishop (b. 377)
- Gondioc, king of Burgundy (approximate date)

474

- January 18 – Leo I, Byzantine emperor (b. 401)
- November 17 – Leo II, Byzantine emperor (b. 467)

475

- May 27 – Eutropius, bishop of Orange
- Flavius Magnus, Roman consul
- Gaero, king of Baekje (Korea)
- Mamertus, bishop of Vienne
- Theodemir, king of the Ostrogoths (approximate date)
- Tonantius Ferreolus, praetorian prefect
- Vincentius, comes Hispaniarum

476

- August
  - Basiliscus, Emperor of the Eastern Roman Empire
  - Marcus, co-Emperor of the Eastern Roman Empire
- August 28 – Orestes, Roman politician and regent
- Xian Wen Di, Chinese Emperor of Northern Wei (b. 454)

477

- January 25 – Genseric, king of the Vandals and Alans
- Armatus, Byzantine general (magister militum)
- Basina, queen of Thuringia (Germany)
- Houfei Di, emperor of the Liu Song Dynasty (b. 463)
- Munju, king of Baekje (Korea)
- Timothy II, Coptic Orthodox patriarch of Alexandria

478

- Liu Bing, high official of the Liu Song Dynasty (b. 433)
- Lupus of Troyes, French bishop and saint (approximate date)
- Shen Youzhi, Chinese general of Liu Song
- Yuan Can, high official of the Liu Song Dynasty (b. 420)

479

- Abraham of Clermont, abbot and saint (approximate date)
- Samgeun, king of Baekje (Korea)
- Shun Di, emperor of Liu Song (b. 467)
- Wang Zhenfeng, empress of Liu Song (b. 436)
- Yuan He, high official of Northern Wei (b. 403)
- Yūryaku, emperor of Japan
