= 478 =

478 in various calendars
- Gregorian calendar: 478; CDLXXVIII
- Ab urbe condita: 1231
- Assyrian calendar: 5228
- Balinese saka calendar: 399–400
- Bengali calendar: −116 – −115
- Berber calendar: 1428
- Buddhist calendar: 1022
- Burmese calendar: −160
- Byzantine calendar: 5986–5987
- Chinese calendar: 丁巳年 (Fire Snake); 3175 or 2968 — to — 戊午年 (Earth Horse); 3176 or 2969
- Coptic calendar: 194–195
- Discordian calendar: 1644
- Ethiopian calendar: 470–471
- Hebrew calendar: 4238–4239
- Hindu calendars
- Vikram Samvat: 534–535
- Shaka Samvat: 399–400
- Kali Yuga: 3578–3579
- Holocene calendar: 10478
- Iranian calendar: 144 BP – 143 BP
- Islamic calendar: 148 BH – 147 BH
- Javanese calendar: 363–364
- Julian calendar: 478; CDLXXVIII
- Korean calendar: 2811
- Minguo calendar: 1434 before ROC 民前1434年
- Nanakshahi calendar: −990
- Seleucid era: 789/790 AG
- Thai solar calendar: 1020–1021
- Tibetan calendar: མེ་མོ་སྦྲུལ་ལོ་ (female Fire-Snake); 604 or 223 or −549 — to — ས་ཕོ་རྟ་ལོ་ (male Earth-Horse); 605 or 224 or −548

Year 478 (CDLXXVIII) was a common year starting on Sunday of the Julian calendar. At the time, it was known as the Year of the Consulship of Illus without colleague (or, less frequently, year 1231 Ab urbe condita). The denomination 478 for this year has been used since the early medieval period, when the Anno Domini calendar era became the prevalent method in Europe for naming years.

== Events ==
=== By place ===
==== Europe ====
- Verina, mother-in-law of Eastern Roman Emperor Zeno, attempts to kill Isaurian general Illus for turning against her brother Basiliscus. A major revolt is led by her son-in-law Marcian and the Ostrogoth warlord Theodoric Strabo, but Illus again proves his loyalty to Zeno by quashing the revolt in 479.

==== Asia ====
- The first Shinto shrines are built in Japan.
- The Liu Song dynasty ends in China.
- Chinese chronicles record a memorial sent by the "King of Japan" (possibly Yūryaku), who describes himself as "Supreme Director of Military Affairs in Japan and Korea" to the Court of the Northern Wei Dynasty. The Chinese emperor responds by confirming the Japanese dynasty in those titles. This is the earliest verifiable date in Japanese history.

== Births ==
- Narses, Byzantine general (d. 573)

== Deaths ==
- Liu Bing, high official of the Liu Song Dynasty (b. 433)
- Lupus of Troyes, French bishop and saint (approximate date)
- Shen Youzhi, Chinese general of Liu Song
- Yuan Can, high official of the Liu Song Dynasty (b. 420)
