= Consort Chen Farong =

Chen Farong (Chinese: 陳法容; fl. 455–479), also known as Chen Zaohua (Chinese: 陈昭华) was an imperial consort of the Chinese Liu Song dynasty. She was a concubine of Emperor Ming, and during his reign, she carried the rank of Zhaohua (昭華), the sixth highest rank for Liu Song imperial consorts.

Consort Chen was from the Liu Song capital Jiankang, and she was regarded as the mother of Emperor Ming's son Liu Zhun (later Emperor Shun), born in August 469, but whether she was his biological mother is a matter of historical dispute. Historical accounts, written during the succeeding Southern Qi Dynasty, indicate that Emperor Ming was impotent, and that although he had 12 sons, those were the results of his having seized his brothers' pregnant concubines and kept the children if they bore males, or his having had his concubines have sexual relations with others. (However, the fact that his wife Empress Wang Zhenfeng had two daughters, although no sons, may argue against such allegations, because it appeared rather unlikely that Emperor Ming would do this over female children—indeed, the allegations stated that he would only do this if his brothers' concubines bore males—or that the morally upright Empress Wang would engage in sexual relations with others, thus suggesting that the allegations were made to delegitimize Emperor Ming's sons, Emperor Houfei and Emperor Shun, vis-à-vis Southern Qi.) Those same accounts indicate that Liu Zhun was actually the biological son of Emperor Ming's brother Liu Xiufan (劉休範), the Prince of Guiyang and one of Liu Xiufan's concubines, and that Emperor Ming had her raise Liu Zhun.

Emperor Ming died in 472, and was succeeded by his son Liu Yu (Emperor Houfei). Because Liu Zhun, as the emperor's brother, carried the title of Prince of Ancheng, Consort Chen was honored as the Princess Dowager of Ancheng. After the impulsive and violent Emperor Houfei was assassinated in 477, the general Xiao Daocheng effectively took over the government and made Liu Zhun a puppet emperor. Consort Chen, as the emperor's mother, was honored as "Consort Dowager" (皇太妃) but not as empress dowager—that title belonged to Emperor Ming's wife Empress Wang. Xiao forced Emperor Shun to yield the throne to him in 479, ending Liu Song and starting Southern Qi, and Emperor Shun was created the Prince of Ruyin. Accordingly, Consort Chen became known as the Princess Dowager of Ruyin. Later that year, the former Emperor Shun was killed by soldiers who were supposed to protect him, and Xiao then ordered a general killing of the Liu clan. It appeared unlikely that Consort Chen would have been killed in the slaughter, although it is not known when she died. It is believed that she died during the beginning years of the Southern Qi.
