= Chu Yuan =

Chinese official (435-482)

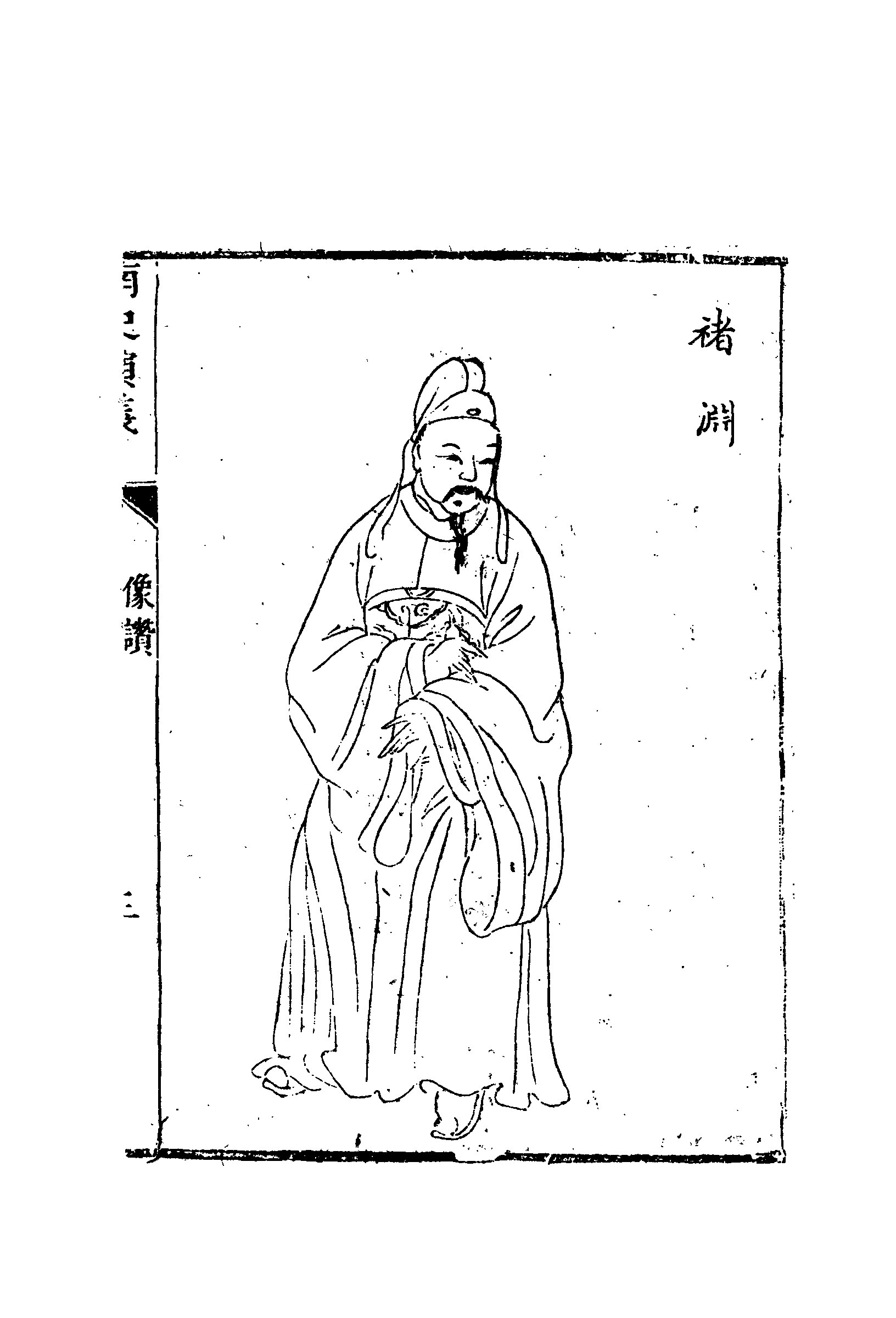
Chu Yuan

Chu Yuan (褚淵) (435 – 19 September 482), courtesy name Yanhui (彥回), formally Duke Wenjian of Nankang (南康文簡公), was a high-level official of the Chinese Liu Song and Southern Qi dynasties.

== Background ==
Chu Yuan was from an aristocratic family. His father was Chu Danzhi (褚湛之), a general under Emperor Wen, who married Emperor Wen's sister Princess Shi'an; Chu Danzhi was also a nephew of Chu Lingyuan, the last empress consort of the Eastern Jin dynasty. After Princess Shi'an died, Chu Danzhi married Emperor Wen's daughter Princess Wu. He was not born of either of the princesses. After Emperor Wen was assassinated by his crown prince Liu Shao in 453, Liu Shao took over as emperor and tried to make Chu Danzhi loyal to him by giving him additional responsibilities. However, Chu Danzhi, during his campaign against his brother Liu Jun the Prince of Wuling, took an opportunity to flee to Liu Jun's camp with Chu Yuan and his younger brother Chu Cheng (褚澄). Chu Yuan had one son by this point, whom they were unable to take with them, and in retaliation Liu Shao had the child put to death. After Liu Jun defeated and killed Liu Shao and took the throne himself as Emperor Xiaowu, he promoted Chu Danzhi for his loyalty, and Chu Yuan became a low-level official in the administration as well. At some point either prior to Emperor Xiaowu's reign or during Emperor Xiaowu's reign, he married Emperor Wen's daughter Princess Baxi. While Chu Yuan was not born of either of his wives, because he was known for his abilities, Princess Wu requested that Chu Yuan be made Chu Danzhi's heir, and he inherited Chu Danzhi's title as the Marquess of Duxiang when Danzhi died on 29 June 460. He, however, gave much of his inheritance to his brothers, largely choosing to retain just books for his own share of the inheritance. Chu Yuan continued to be gradually promoted, and by the reign of Emperor Xiaowu's son Emperor Qianfei in 464, he was already a fairly important official. During the reign of the violent and arbitrary Emperor Qianfei, who gave many young men to his sister Liu Chuyu the Princess Kuaiji to be her lovers, Liu Chuyu wanted Chu Yuan to be her lover as well, and Emperor Qianfei agreed. However, while he was tempted over a 10-day period, he refused to have sexual relations with her, and she released him.

== Service under Emperor Ming ==
After Emperor Qianfei was assassinated by his attendants in January 466, his uncle Liu Yu the Prince of Xiangdong succeeded him (as Emperor Ming). Because Emperor Ming and Chu Yuan were friends when Emperor Ming was still an imperial prince, he trusted Chu Yuan and continued to promote him, although in 471, when Emperor Ming grew ill, Chu was not at the capital but was the governor of Wu Commandery (roughly modern Suzhou, Jiangsu). Emperor Ming, wanting to entrust his son Liu Yu the Crown Prince (different character) to Chu, recalled him to the capital, and distrusting his brother Liu Xiuren (劉休仁) the Prince of Jian'an and the prime minister, plotted with Chu to have Liu Xiuren killed. (Initially, Chu opposed this, but when Emperor Ming got angry with him, Chu acquiesced.) Soon, Emperor Ming promoted Chu and Yuan Can to high level posts, preparing them to be in charge of the government after his death.

== Service under Emperor Houfei ==
After Emperor Ming died in May 472 and was succeeded by Crown Prince Yu (as Emperor Houfei), Chu Yuan and Yuan Can became in charge of the government, although Emperor Ming's associates Ruan Dianfu (阮佃夫) and Wang Daolong (王道隆) continued to be powerful and corrupt, and Chu and Yuan were unable to curb them. In late 472, they added Emperor Ming's distant cousin Liu Bing into the decision process, and after the general Xiao Daocheng suppressed the rebellion of Emperor Houfei's uncle Liu Xiufan (劉休範) the Prince of Guiyang in 474, Xiao was added to the circle as well, and the four were known as the "four nobles" (四貴).

In 477, Emperor Houfei, by now aged 14, was growing increasingly impulsive and violent, often wandering outside the palace with his guards and killing all people or animals they encountered. One day, he suddenly charged into Xiao's headquarters, and saw Xiao sleeping naked. He was intrigued by the large size of Xiao's belly, and he woke Xiao up, drew a target on Xiao's belly, and prepared to shoot Xiao with arrows. Xiao pleaded for his life, and Emperor Houfei's attendant Wang Tian'en (王天恩) pointed out that if he killed Xiao with an arrow, he would lose Xiao's belly as a wonderful target—and so at Wang's suggestion, Emperor Houfei shot Xiao with bone-made round-point arrows and was pleased when he was able to target Xiao's bellybutton successfully. Xiao became fearful after the incident, and he initially discussed with Yuan and Chu the possibilities of deposing the emperor, but could not get them to go along with his plan. Xiao therefore acted on his own, associating with Emperor Houfei's attendants, and eventually getting one of them, Yang Yufu (楊玉夫), to kill Emperor Houfei while Emperor Houfei was asleep. Xiao then forced Yuan and Liu Bing to effectively grant him near-imperial powers, leading to concerns that Xiao would next take the throne. During this process, Chu, who had been friends with Xiao, largely supported Xiao's power-grabbing moves.

== Service under Emperor Shun ==
Xiao Daocheng made Emperor Houfei's brother Liu Zhun the Prince of Ancheng emperor (as Emperor Shun). In response, the general Shen Youzhi arose with the troops of his Jing Province (荊州, modern central and western Hubei), accusing Xiao of wanting to usurp the throne. Yuan and Liu Bing also believed that that was Xiao's intent, and, as Xiao prepared for a campaign against Shen, secretly planned another uprising within Jiankang to overthrow Xiao. However, Yuan, believing that the plot would not succeed without Chu Yuan's support, told Chu of the plot as well, and Chu, who was friendly with Xiao, quickly informed Xiao. Yuan, not aware of this, continued his preparations, aligning with a number of generals and preparing to rise. However, Liu Bing panicked during the preparation stage, and fled to Yuan's defense post at the fortress of Shitou Cheng several hours in advance of the scheduled time, alarming Xiao and allowing him to further start a counterinsurgency, arresting and killing several generals aligned with Yuan and Liu Bing before they could act. Xiao's troops then sieged Yuan's defenses at Shitou. Yuan was killed in battle, and Liu Bing fled but was captured and executed as well. This led to a popular lament, written into a song, that stated, "Alas Shitou. It is better to die as Yuan Can than to live as Chu Yuan!" By 478, Shen was defeated as well, and there appeared to be no longer any threat to Xiao, who became increasingly resolute to take over the throne. While Yuan did not participate in Xiao's discussion with his associates, chief of whom was Wang Jian, in taking over the throne, he continued to acquiesce in the additional honors that Xiao was having bestowed on himself in preparation for taking over the throne, including granting Xiao the nine bestowments and the successive titles of Duke of Qi, and then Prince of Qi, in 479. In summer 479, Xiao forced Emperor Shun to abdicate and then, with Chu ceremonially offering him the imperial seal, accepted the throne, ending Liu Song and establishing Southern Qi (as its Emperor Gao).

== Service during Southern Qi ==
Emperor Gao made Chu Yuan titularly his prime minister. He was created the Duke of Nankang. The popular opinion at the time, however, severely criticized him for not being more protective of Liu Song and acquiescing to Southern Qi's takeover. This low opinion of Chu carried over even among the ranks of other Southern Qi officials. In 480, at a feast hosted by Emperor Gao's crown prince Xiao Ze, Chu got into an argument with another official, Shen Wenji (沈文季), and Shen, in anger, yelled out, "Chu Yuan calls himself a faithful subject, but after he dies, how would he be able to face Emperor Ming of Song?" Crown Prince Ji laughed off the matter, but this was a demonstration of the damage that had been done to Chu's reputation despite his high rank.

In April 482, Emperor Gao died and was succeeded by Crown Prince Ji (as Emperor Wu). Chu remained a high-ranking official, and Emperor Gao's will, indeed, specifically designated him and Wang Jian to assist the new emperor. Five months later, Chu himself died. His heir apparent Chu Ben (褚賁), who was ashamed that his father could not remain faithful to Liu Song, yielded the title to another son of Chu Yuan, Chu Qin (褚蓁), and he settled as a hermit in a house next to his father's tomb.
