= Wang Jian (Southern Qi) =

Chinese politician

Wang Jian (王儉) (452 – 16 June 489), courtesy name Zhongbao (仲寶), formally Duke Wenxian of Nanchang (南昌文憲公), was an official of the Chinese Liu Song and Southern Qi dynasties, who was particularly powerful during the reigns of the first two emperors of Southern Qi, Emperor Gao (Xiao Daocheng) and Emperor Wu (Xiao Ze).

== Family background ==
Wang Jian came from one of the most powerful noble families of the Southern Dynasties, the Wang clan of Langya. He was a fifth-generation descendant of the Wang Dao, one of the most famous Prime Ministers of the Eastern Jin dynasty. His grandfather Wang Tanshou (王曇首) was one of the most trusted officials of Emperor Wen of Song, and his father Wang Sengchuo (王僧綽) was an important official late in Emperor Wen's reign as well. As Wang Sengchuo was involved in Emperor Wen's decision-making process in whether to depose his crown prince Liu Shao, Liu Shao, after assassinating Emperor Wen in 453, had Wang Sengchuo killed, and Wang Jian was raised by his uncle Wang Sengqian (王僧虔). Wang Jian inherited the title that Liu Shao's brother Emperor Xiaowu posthumously honored Wang Sengchuo with—Marquess of Yuzhang.

== Service during Liu Song ==
Because of Wang Jian's noble birth and because he became known for studiousness in his youth, Yuan Can, the mayor of the capital Jiankang under Emperor Xiaowu's brother Emperor Ming recommended him to be the husband of Emperor Ming's daughter, Princess Yangxian. However, Emperor Ming felt that because Wang Sengchuo's wife Liu Ying'e (劉英娥) the Princess Dongyang (who was not Wang Jian's mother) was involved in the witchcraft carried out by Liu Shao, she should not be his daughter's mother-in-law, he wanted to disinter Princess Dongyang's body from her joint tomb with Wang Sengchuo. Wang Jian pleaded that this not be carried out—stating that he would rather die—and Emperor Ming did not insist. During Emperor Ming's reign, he was repeatedly promoted, although was never among the upper echelon of officials.

After Emperor Ming died in 472 and was succeeded by his violent and arbitrary son Emperor Houfei, Wang became fearful and requested that Yuan, who was then in charge of the government along with Chu Yuan, make him a commandery governor. Yuan made him the governor of Yixing Commandery (義興, roughly modern Wuxi, Jiangsu). After the general Xiao Daocheng assassinated Emperor Houfei in 477, and effectively took over the government, Wang was recalled to the capital in 478.

Wang could see what Xiao wanted to do next—take over the throne—and he was the only nobleman who actively sought to assist Xiao in doing so, and he carried out the planning for the various steps that Xiao would take in taking over. In 479, Xiao was able to take over from Emperor Houfei's brother Emperor Shun, ending Liu Song and starting Southern Qi, as its Emperor Gao.

== Service during Southern Qi ==
For Wang Jian's contributions during his takeover, Emperor Gao created him the Duke of Nanchang. Even though Emperor Gao made Chu Yuan prime minister, Wang appeared to have more actual power. He often compared himself to the Jin prime minister Xie An, praising Xie for his elegant style. In 479, Emperor Gao wanted to institute a universal identification card program in Jiankang to keep social order, but Wang persuaded him of its impracticality. In 482, when Emperor Gao died and was succeeded by his son Emperor Wu, Wang and Chu were the two officials that Emperor Gao entrusted the new emperor to (however, Emperor Wu was older than Wang).

Emperor Wu continued to entrust Wang with great responsibilities within his administration, particularly after Chu died later in 482. Because of how powerful Wang was, his uncle Wang Sengqian, not wanting too much attention toward one household, repeatedly turned down promotions, and further advised Wang Jian not to be overly wasteful at his mansion. In 484, Wang Jian advised Emperor Wu to reduce the power of four secretaries that he had, and while Emperor Wu took the unusual step of personally writing a letter to Wang Jian to explain himself, he did not follow Wang's advice in this matter, and at one point, Wang lamented that while he was prime minister, his power was not as great as one of these secretaries, Ru Faliang (茹法亮). However, it was also said that anyone that Wang recommended for post was immediately commissioned by Emperor Wu.

At some point during Emperor Gao or Emperor Wu's reign, Wang also took on the secondary responsibility of being the principal of the imperial university, and by 485, Emperor Wu had merged the imperial research facility Zongmingguan (總明觀) into the university, allowing Wang to have the school set up entirely within his own mansion. As Wang was also a Confucian scholar, it was said that from this point on, the university switched from a focus on literature to Confucianism. In 489, Wang Jian died.
