= Jiang Jiangui =

Chinese empress

Jiang Jiangui (江簡珪) was an empress of the Chinese Liu Song dynasty. Her husband was Emperor Houfei of Liu Song (Liu Yu).

Very little is known about her. Jiang Jiangui came from a noble lineage, as her grandfather Jiang Zhiyuan (江智淵) was a famed, albeit not particularly powerful, official during the reign of Emperor Xiaowu, but who died in fear in c.16 February 463 after offending Emperor Xiaowu over the issue of the posthumous name for his favorite concubine Consort Yin. Jiang Jiangui's father Jiang Jiyun (江季筠) was a mid-low-level official in the imperial administration as well, but died by 470, when Liu Yu's father Emperor Ming was selecting a wife for him, who was then crown prince. The superstitious Emperor Ming, however, was told by fortunetellers that despite—or perhaps because of—the Jiang clan's relative weakness at that point, that Jiang Jiangui was the appropriate choice. He therefore selected her to be his son's wife on 5 April 470. Her age at that time is not known, but her husband was just seven years old.

After she was married to Liu Yu, she carried the title of crown princess, and after Emperor Ming died and was succeeded by Liu Yu (as Emperor Houfei) on 11 May 472, he created her empress on 15 July 472. After he was killed by his general Xiao Daocheng in 477, he was posthumously demoted to the title of Prince of Cangwu, and she was accordingly demoted to the title of Princess of Cangwu. It is not known when she died.

Chinese royalty
Preceded by Empress Wang Zhenfeng	Empress of Liu Song; 472–477	Succeeded by Empress Xie Fanjing
