= Chen Miaodeng =

Chen Miaodeng (陳妙登) (c. 449 – ?) was an imperial consort during the Chinese Liu Song dynasty of the Southern dynasties period. She was a concubine of Emperor Ming (Liu Yu), and during his reign, she carried the rank of Guifei (貴妃), which was not a regular rank for Liu Song imperial consorts but a title that Emperor Ming created to honor her.

Chen Miaodeng was from a household that was viewed lowly by the society at the time—a butcher's household—at the Liu Song capital Jiankang. During the reign of Emperor Xiaowu, he often had his attendants seek out beautiful women to be added to the rank of his concubines. On one occasion, when he saw the Chens' house, which was made of hay, from a distance, he sent an attendant to deliver money to the house, so that the people in the household could build a brick house. When the attendant arrived at the house, only Chen Miaodeng was home; she was about 12 to 13 (by East Asian reckoning at the time). The attendant saw that she was beautiful and informed Emperor Xiaowu about her. He therefore took her into the palace, and she resided with his mother Empress Dowager Lu Huinan. After a while, however, she lost his favor, and Empress Dowager Lu decided to instead give her to Emperor Xiaowu's younger brother Liu Yu the Prince of Xiangdong, who initially greatly favored her. After more than a year, however, she lost his favor as well, and he gave her to his attendant Li Dao'er (李道兒). He, however, later took her back, and she gave birth to his oldest son Liu Yu (different character than Emperor Ming) in March 463. It is because she spent time as Li's concubine that there later were rumors, which her son apparently gave some credence to, that it was actually Li, and not the Prince of Xiangdong, who was her son's biological father. Indeed, historical accounts, written during the succeeding Southern Qi dynasty indicate that Liu Yu was impotent, and that although he had 12 sons, those were the results of his having seized his brothers' pregnant concubines and kept the children if they bore males, or his having had his concubines have sexual relations with others. (However, the fact that his wife Princess Wang Zhenfeng had two daughters, although no sons, may argue against such allegations, because it appeared rather unlikely that Liu Yu would do this over female children—indeed, the allegations stated that he would only do this if his brothers' concubines bore males—or that the morally upright Princess Wang would engage in sexual relations with others, thus suggesting that the allegations were made to delegitimize Emperor Ming's sons Liu Yu and Emperor Shun (Liu Zhun) vis-à-vis Southern Qi.) After Liu Yu became emperor (as Emperor Ming) in 465 following the assassination of his nephew Liu Ziye (Emperor Xiaowu's son), he created her son crown prince in 466 and gave her the title of Guifei, designating the rank as equally honorable as a crown princess. Crown Prince Yu was an impulsive child who appeared to be hyperactive and emotional, often putting himself into physical danger. At Emperor Ming's orders, Consort Chen often gave him beatings.

After Emperor Ming died in May 472, Crown Prince Yu took the throne as Emperor Houfei. Consort Chen was honored as "Consort Dowager" (皇太妃) on 7 August 472, but not as empress dowager—that title was given to Emperor Ming's wife Empress Wang. Initially, both Empress Dowager Wang and Consort Dowager Chen were able to somewhat rein in the young emperor. But by 477, they had nearly lost all control over him, who spent day and night outside the palace with his attendants, killing anyone or anything that came near them. When he considered killing his general Xiao Daocheng, Consort Chen rebuked him and persuaded him not to—stating to him that Xiao had greatly contributed to his reign (by having suppressed the rebellion of his uncle Liu Xiufan (劉休範) the Prince of Guiyang in 473) and that if he killed Xiao, no one would again be loyal to him. Xiao, in fear, nevertheless persuaded Emperor Houfei's attendant Yang Yufu (楊玉夫) to assassinate him in fall 477, making Emperor Houfei's brother Liu Zhun the Prince of Ancheng emperor (as Emperor Shun). Emperor Houfei was posthumously demoted to the title of Prince of Cangwu, and Consort Dowager Chen was accordingly demoted to the title of Princess Dowager of Cangwu. Nothing further is known about her, and it is not known when she died.
