= 479 =

479 in various calendars
- Gregorian calendar: 479; CDLXXIX
- Ab urbe condita: 1232
- Assyrian calendar: 5229
- Balinese saka calendar: 400–401
- Bengali calendar: −115 – −114
- Berber calendar: 1429
- Buddhist calendar: 1023
- Burmese calendar: −159
- Byzantine calendar: 5987–5988
- Chinese calendar: 戊午年 (Earth Horse); 3176 or 2969 — to — 己未年 (Earth Goat); 3177 or 2970
- Coptic calendar: 195–196
- Discordian calendar: 1645
- Ethiopian calendar: 471–472
- Hebrew calendar: 4239–4240
- Hindu calendars
- Vikram Samvat: 535–536
- Shaka Samvat: 400–401
- Kali Yuga: 3579–3580
- Holocene calendar: 10479
- Iranian calendar: 143 BP – 142 BP
- Islamic calendar: 147 BH – 146 BH
- Javanese calendar: 364–365
- Julian calendar: 479; CDLXXIX
- Korean calendar: 2812
- Minguo calendar: 1433 before ROC 民前1433年
- Nanakshahi calendar: −989
- Seleucid era: 790/791 AG
- Thai solar calendar: 1021–1022
- Tibetan calendar: ས་ཕོ་རྟ་ལོ་ (male Earth-Horse); 605 or 224 or −548 — to — ས་མོ་ལུག་ལོ་ (female Earth-Sheep); 606 or 225 or −547

Year 479 (CDLXXIX) was a common year starting on Monday of the Julian calendar. At the time, it was known as the Year of the Consulship of Zeno without colleague (or, less frequently, year 1232 Ab urbe condita). The denomination 479 for this year has been used since the early medieval period, when the Anno Domini calendar era became the prevalent method in Europe for naming years.

== Events ==
=== By place ===
==== Britannia ====
- Ambrosius Aurelianus, war leader of the Romano-British, is proclaimed king of the Britons (according to Historia Regum Britanniae). He rules probably in the south of Britain, and continues the war against the Anglo-Saxons.

==== Europe ====
- King Theodoric the Great starts a 4-year campaign against the Byzantine Empire. The Ostrogoths ravage the Roman provinces (Moesia and Thrace), and threaten the capital of Constantinople itself.
- Julius Nepos, former emperor of the Western Roman Empire, plans military campaigns in Dalmatia against Odoacer, hoping to regain control of Italy himself.

==== Asia ====
- Summer – The Liu Song dynasty ends and the Southern Qi dynasty begins in southern China. Emperor Shun Di is forced to abandon the throne and Qi Gao Di becomes the first ruler of Southern Qi. Later former Emperor Shun and empress Wang Zhenfeng are killed by the imperial guard, near the vicinity of the capital Jiankang.
- As Lý Trường Nhân, Jiaozhou's governor, died in final days of the Liu Song dynasty, Lý Thúc Hiến requested the Liu Song to be appointed as Trường Nhân's successor. The Liu Song rejected Thúc Hiến's request and appointed Thẩm Hoán, the governor of Nanhai Commandery, as the new governor of Jiaozhou, while Thúc Hiến was assigned to govern Vũ Bình and Tân Xương. However, with strong support from the local population, Thúc Hiến deployed troops throughout the region, preventing Thẩm Hoán from assuming office in Jiaozhou. As a result, Thẩm Hoán was forced to remain in Uất Lâm during the turbulent final days of the Liu Song dynasty, where he eventually died.
- In July, emperor Qi Gao Di granted permission for Lý Thúc Hiến to continue his rule over Jiaozhou as its state governor.
- Dongseong becomes king of the Korean kingdom of Baekje.
- Soji becomes king of the Korean kingdom of Silla.

== Births ==
- Ruan Xiaoxu, bibliography writer (d. 536)

== Deaths ==
- Abraham of Clermont, abbot and saint (approximate date)
- Samgeun, king of Baekje (Korea)
- Shun Di, emperor of Liu Song (b. 467)
- Wang Zhenfeng, empress of Liu Song (b. 436)
- Yuan He, high official of Northern Wei (b. 403)
- Yūryaku, emperor of Japan
