= Xie Fanjing =

Xie Fanjing 謝梵境
- Spouse: Emperor Shun of Song
- Father: Xie Yang (謝颺)

Xie Fanjing (謝梵境) was an empress of the Chinese Liu Song dynasty. Her husband was the last ruler of the dynasty, Emperor Shun.

== Biography ==
Xie Fanjing came from a noble family—her father Xie Yang (謝颺) was a mid-low level official in the imperial administration, but her grandfather Xie Zhuang (謝莊) was a highly ranked, albeit not particularly powerful official in the administrations of Emperor Xiaowu and Emperor Ming, and was a descendant of Xie Wan (謝萬), the younger brother of the famed Jin prime minister Xie An. (Xie Zhuang's father Xie Hongwei (謝弘微) was adopted into Xie An's line, and so could also be considered a descendant of Xie An.)

Fanjing married Emperor Shun as his empress on 26 November 478, when he was 11 and effectively a puppet emperor under the general and regent Xiao Daocheng; her age at that time was not known. Shun was forced to yield the throne to Xiao in 479, ending Liu Song and starting Southern Qi. As Xiao created Emperor Shun the Prince of Ruyin, she carried the title of Princess of Ruyin. Later that year, Emperor Shun was killed by soldiers who were supposed to protect him, and Xiao followed by ordering the execution of the Liu clan.

It appears probable that Fanjing survived the slaughter, as the slaughter targeted male members of the clan, although it is not known conclusively. It is also not known when she died, and there was no record of a posthumous name given to her.

== Sources ==
Chinese royalty
Preceded by Empress Jiang Jiangui	Empress of Liu Song; 478–479	Dynasty ended
Preceded by Empress Jiang Jiangui	Empress of China (Southern); 478–479	Succeeded by Empress He of Southern Qi
