= Empress Xie =

Empress Xie may refer to:

- Empress Xie Fanjing, wife of Emperor Shun of Liu Song
- Empress Xie (Xiaozong), wife of Emperor Xiaozong of Song
- Empress Xie Daoqing, wife of Emperor Lizong of Song
