= Wang Zhenfeng =

Wang Zhenfeng 王貞風

Empress consort of Liu Song
- Tenure: 22 January 466 – 15 July 472
- Predecessor: Empress Lu
- Successor: Empress Jiang
- Born: 436
- Died: 12 November 479 (aged 42–43); Jiankang, Southern Qi
- Spouse: Emperor Ming of Song
- Issue: Liu Bosi (劉伯姒); Liu Boyuan (劉伯媛)
Posthumous name
- Empress Gong (恭皇后)
- Father: Wang Senglang

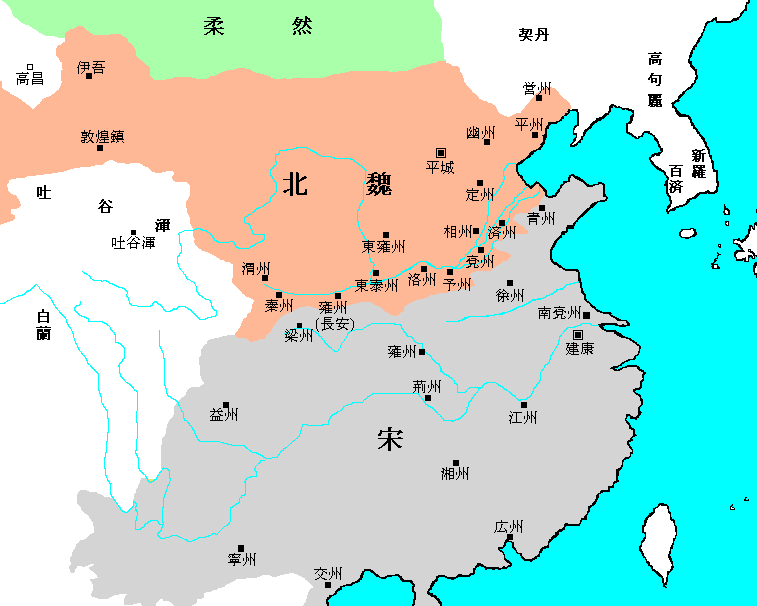
Liu Song dynasty coloured in gray, covering majority of Southern China.

Wang Zhenfeng (Chinese: 王貞風; 436 – 12 November 479), formally Empress Gong (恭皇后, literally "the respectful empress"), was an empress of the Chinese Liu Song dynasty. Her husband was Emperor Ming of Song (Liu Yu). She served as regent during the minority of Latter Deposed Emperor of Liu Song from 472 to 477.

== Early life and family ==
Wang Zhenfeng was born in 436 into an aristocratic family. Her father Wang Senglang (王僧朗) was a mid-high-level official for Emperor Wen of Song. Her older brother Wang Yu (王彧) was so highly regarded by Wen for his talent that Wen named a son of his after Wang Yu. Emperor Wen then had Liu Yu, then the Prince of Huaiyang, marry Wang Zhenfeng in 448. After marriage, Zhenfeng carried the title of Princess of Huaiyang, and after Liu Yu's title was changed to Prince of Xiangdong on 16 August 452, she became the Princess of Xiangdong. They had two daughters, Liu Bosi (劉伯姒) and Liu Boyuan (劉伯媛).

== As empress consort ==
After Liu Yu's impulsive and violent nephew Liu Ziye was assassinated in January 466, Liu Yu, considered kind and open-minded by the officials and court attendants, was declared emperor (as Emperor Ming). He created Princess Wang empress. However, contrary to his pre-ascension reputation, he soon turned cruel and immoral as well. Official historical accounts written during the subsequent Southern Qi dynasty said that he was also impotent, and that although he had 12 sons, those were the results of his having seized his brothers' pregnant concubines and kept the children if they bore males, or his having had his concubines have sexual relations with others. (However, the fact that Empress Wang had two daughters may argue against such allegations, because it appeared rather unlikely that Ming would do this over female children—indeed, the allegations stated that he would only do this if his brothers' concubines bore males—or that the morally upright Empress Wang would engage in sexual relations with others, thus suggesting that the allegations were made to de-legitimize Ming's sons Emperor Houfei and Emperor Shun vis-à-vis Southern Qi.)

In one famous incident in 470, Ming held an imperial feast inside the palace, and ordered his ladies in waiting to strip for the guests. Empress Wang, embarrassed, covered her eyes with a fan. In anger, Emperor said, "Your household is so naïve and unaware of the world. Today everyone is trying to have fun, so why are you covering your eyes?" She responded, "There are many ways to have fun. What kind of a scene is it for aunts and sisters to gather to watch naked ladies in waiting and laugh about it? The fun that our household has is different." He became angrier and chased her away. When her brother (who had by now changed his name to Wang Jingwen (王景文) to observe naming taboo) heard this, he commented, "My sister was meek before she was married. I am surprised that now she can be so upright."

In 472, Emperor Ming grew seriously ill, and he believed that after his death, Empress Wang would become regent, and that her brother Wang Jingwen would become overly powerful. Thus, he forced Wang Jingwen to commit suicide. He then died and was succeeded by his oldest son (by his concubine Consort Chen Miaodeng), Liu Yu (different character than Emperor Ming), as Emperor Houfei.

== As empress dowager ==
Emperor Houfei honoured Empress Wang as empress dowager on 15 July 472 and his mother Consort Chen as consort dowager on 7 August 472. Empress Wang was a titularly regent, but the authority was actually in hands of Ming's associates Yang Yunchang (楊運長) and Ruan Dianfu (阮佃夫), and the officials Xiao Daocheng, Yuan Can, Chu Yuan, and Liu Bing. Initially, the relationship between him and Empress Dowager Wang appeared cordial, and in 474, when Emperor Houfei's uncle Liu Xiufan (劉休範) the Prince of Guiyang rebelled and appeared to be on the verge of victory, Empress Dowager Wang held Emperor Houfei and wept. After Liu Xiufan was defeated, initially Emperor Houfei feared rebuke from Empress Dowager Wang and Consort Dowager Chen and therefore was careful in his actions, but eventually grew more and more frivolous and violent in his actions. At Duan Wu festival in 477, Empress Wang gave him a gift of a feather fan. He felt that it was insufficiently luxurious, and ordered the imperial physicians to brew poison as preparation to poison her. He only stopped after his attendants reminded him that if he poisoned Empress Dowager Wang, he would have to observe a mourning period of three years and would not be able to spend time on fun and games.

On Qixi Festival (Chinese Valentine's Day) in 477, after Houfei had tried to but then not actually killed Xiao Daocheng, Xiao Daocheng had Houfei's attendant Yang Yufu (楊玉夫) assassinate Houfei, and then, issuing an edict in Empress Dowager Wang's name, ordered Houfei posthumously deposed and his younger brother Liu Zhun installed as Emperor Shun. The general Shen Youzhi then rose against Xiao, also claiming to be acting with Empress Dowager Wang's approval. (There is no real evidence that Empress Wang was involved either with Xiao's assassination plot or with Shen's rebellion.) After Xiao's forces defeated Shen's (and also defeated a coup attempt by Yuan and Liu), in 479, he forced Empress Wang and Emperor Shun to yield imperial authority to him, ending Liu Song and establishing Southern Qi. He created the former Emperor Shun as the Prince of Ruyin and Empress Dowager Wang as Princess Dowager of Ruyin, but later that year had Emperor Shun and other members of the Liu clan slaughtered. The former Empress Dowager Wang died later that year and was buried with imperial honours, according to Liu Song customs, with her husband.

== Sources ==
Chinese royalty
Preceded by Empress Lu	Empress of Liu Song (Jiankang region); 465–472	Succeeded by Empress Jiang Jiangui
Preceded by Empress Lu	Empress of Liu Song (Most regions); 466–472	Succeeded by Empress Jiang Jiangui
Preceded by Empress Lu	Empress of China (Northern Jiangsu); 466	Succeeded by Empress Feng Qing of Northern Wei
Preceded by Empress Lu	Empress of China (Shandong); 466–469	Succeeded by Empress Feng Qing of Northern Wei
