= Nine bestowments =

1st–7th-century Chinese imperial awards to officials

The nine bestowments (Chinese: 九錫; pinyin: jiǔ cì) were awards given by Chinese emperors to officials, ostensibly to reward them for their accomplishments. While the nature of the bestowments was probably established during the Zhou dynasty, there was no record of anyone receiving them until Wang Mang. Thereafter, the nine bestowments became typically a sign of a powerful official showing off his complete control of the emperor and establishing his intent to usurp the throne. For the rest of Chinese history, it became rare for a usurpation to happen without the nine bestowments having been given sometime before. It was almost as rare for the nine bestowments to be given without a usurpation happening, though it did happen (as when Cao Pi gave Sun Quan the nine bestowments in 221 while Sun was briefly Cao Wei's vassal). Conversely, officials who made important contributions and were offered the nine bestowments would decline them to show their loyalty and lack of intention to usurp the throne.

== The nine bestowments ==
The nine bestowments according to the Classic of Rites, and their meanings, explained in the Han dynasty commentary Bai Hu Tong:

1. Gift of a wagon and horses: when the official is appropriate in his modesty and walking in an appropriate manner, so that he does not need to walk any more.
2. Gift of clothes: when the official writes well and appropriately, to show his good deeds.
3. Gift of armed guards: when the official is brave and willing to speak the truth, so that he can be protected.
4. Gift of written music: when the official has love in his heart, so that he can teach the music to his people.
5. Gift of a ramp: when the official is appropriate in his acts, so that he can walk on the ramp and maintain his strength.
6. Gift of a red door: when the official maintains his household well, so that his household can be shown to be different.
7. Gift of arms, bow, and arrows: when the official has good conscience and follows what is right, so that he can represent the central government to stamp out treason.
8. Gift of an axe: when the official is strong, wise, and loyal to the imperial household, so that he can execute the wicked.
9. Gift of wine: when the official is filially pious, so that he can sacrifice the wine to his ancestors.

== Pronunciation ==
The reason why the character 錫 (usually pronounced xī in modern Mandarin and meaning "tin") is used, rather than the expected 賜 (cì, meaning "bestowment"), is that 錫 was used as a jiajie (假借, 'rebus') character for "bestowment", interchangeably with 賜 during the times when the ceremonies were first established in the Classic of Rites. Thus, the semantically correct modern reading should be jiǔ cì and not jiǔ xī.

== List of recipients of the Nine Bestowments ==
Recipient	Year	Usurped	Founded	Comments
Wang Mang	5	Han dynasty crown prince Ruzi Ying	Xin dynasty	Creator and first recipient of the title. Usurped the Han dynasty while serving as regent and founded the Xin dynasty.
Cao Cao	213	N/A	N/A	His son Cao Pi would usurp Emperor Xian of Han and found Cao Wei.
Sun Quan	221	N/A	Eastern Wu	Granted by Cao Pi after Sun Quan offered to nominally be a vassal of Cao Wei.
Sima Yi	249/250	N/A	N/A	Stripped Cao Shuang of all his positions and had him executed a short while later in what is known as the Incident at the Gaoping Tombs, thereby resulting in him serving as the de facto paramount political authority in Wei, and subsequently paving the way for his successors Sima Shi (eldest son), Sima Zhao (second oldest son), and Sima Yan (grandson). Although he rejected the nine bestowments on both occasions.
Sima Zhao	263	N/A	N/A	First Jin ruler as Duke of Jin from 263 until 264, then King of Jin from 264 until his death in 265. His son, Sima Yan, would force Cao Huan to abdicate to him in 266, and declare himself the Emperor of the Jin dynasty.
Sima Jiong	301	N/A	N/A	Granted title for his role in restoring, and becoming regent for, the developmentally disabled Emperor Hui of Jin.
Sima Ying	301	N/A	N/A	Granted title for his role in restoring, and becoming regent for, the developmentally disabled Emperor Hui of Jin (he declined the bestowment).
Sima Yong	301	N/A	N/A	Granted 3 of the 9 bestowments for his role in restoring Emperor Hui.
Zhang Mao	323	N/A	Former Liang	Founded Former Liang, received the nine bestowments in return for his submission to Han-Zhao.
Shi Hu	333	Shi Hong	N/A	Deposed his cousin and became the emperor of Later Zhao.
Qifu Gangui	394	N/A	N/A	Granted title by Emperor Fu Deng of Former Qin in order to secure his aid and loyalty.
Huan Xuan	403	Emperor An of Jin	State of Chu	Usurped Emperor An of Jin and attempted to found the Chu dynasty before being suppressed by Liu Yu.
Qiao Zong	409	N/A	Western Shu	Led a rebellion against the Jin dynasty and declared the state of Western Shu, which then became a puppet state of Later Qin, and was granted the nine bestowments by Emperor Wenhuan of (Later) Qin.
Liu Yu	418	Emperor Gong of Jin	Liu Song dynasty	Given the nine bestowments and the title Duke of Song, then forced Emperor An of Jin to bestow upon him the additional title Prince of Song, although he publicly declined it. He later deposed Emperor An, and installed Emperor Gong of Jin on the throne in 419, from whom he would eventually accept the title Prince of Song in fall 419, and whom he would usurp a short while later, founding the Liu Song dynasty in 420.
Xiao Daocheng	479	Emperor Shun of Liu Song	Southern Qi	Killed the young, but himself cruel Emperor Houfei in 477, then put Emperor Shun of Liu Song on the throne, from whom he would receive the nine bestowments in 479, and whom he would usurp, and exterminate the clan of, in the same year.
Xiao Yan	502	Emperor He of Southern Qi	Liang dynasty	As Xiao Yan was besieging Jiankang, Xiao Baojuan's own associates assassinated him in 501. He was granted the nine bestowments from the latter's co-emperor, Emperor He of Southern Qi, in 502, whom he would usurp in the same year, and then go on to have killed a while later.
Gao Yang	550	Emperor Xiaojing of Eastern Wei	Northern Qi	Gao Yang's father, Gao Huan, started consolidating his power during the reign of Emperor Xiaowu of Northern Wei, which caused the emperor to flee, splitting up the empire, and making Gao Huan choose Emperor Xiaojing in the new state of Eastern Wei as his replacement. However, it was Gao Yang who, after his father's death, would receive the nine bestowments in 550, and then go on to usurp the throne from Emperor Xiaojing in the same year, whom he would later poison in 552.
Hou Jing	551	Xiao Dong	State of Han	Captured the capital of Liang and briefly declared himself emperor before being defeated by imperial forces.
Chen Baxian	557	Emperor Jing of Liang	Chen dynasty	Chen Baxian appointed Emperor Jing of Liang to be the next ruler of the Liang dynasty in 555, as he was the only surviving male heir of the previous ruler Emperor Yuan of Liang, but he deposed him in 557 to found the Chen dynasty, and had him killed in 558.
Yang Jian	581	Emperor Jing of Northern Zhou	Sui dynasty	He came to hold the regency over the young Emperor Jing of Northern Zhou after the death of the latter's father, Emperor Xuan of Northern Zhou. After the Northern Zhou general Yuchi Jiong became suspicious of Yang Jian's intentions, he launched a rebellion against him, but was defeated, after which Yang Jian eventually seized the throne as Emperor Wen of Sui, and shortly thereafter had Emperor Jing and his entire clan exterminated.
Wang Shichong	619	Yang Tong	State of Zheng	Usurped Yang Tong of the Sui dynasty during the transition from Sui to Tang, attempted to found a new Zheng dynasty before being defeated at the Battle of Hulao by Li Shimin.
Tan Bocang	1053	Emperor Renzong of Song	Song dynasty	Awarded the Nine Bestowments (九錫) and posthumously enfeoffed with the title of Senior Advisor (資政大夫) for three generations after a long career as Juren (舉人) in 1038, Jinshi (進士) in 1048, then Vice Minister of Personnel (吏部侍郎), then promoted as Minister of Justice (刑部尚書).

== See also ==
- Number nine in Chinese culture
- Nine familial exterminations
