= Liu Bing (official) =

Liu Bing (Chinese: 劉秉) (433 – 12 January 478), courtesy name Yanjie (彥節), was a high-level official of the Chinese Liu Song dynasty and a member of Liu Song's imperial clan, who near the end of the dynasty made a futile attempt to prevent the general Xiao Daocheng from gaining sufficient power to take the throne.

== Background ==
Liu Bing was born in 433. His father Liu Yizong (劉義宗), as a son of the dynasty founder Emperor Wu's brother Liu Daolian (劉道憐) the Prince of Changsha, was the Marquess of Xinyu. In 444, Liu Yizong died, and initially, Liu Bing's older brother Liu Jie (劉玠) inherited the title. However, after Emperor Wen was assassinated by his crown prince Liu Shao in 453, Liu Shao, because he particularly disliked his cousins from Liu Daolian's line, had a number of them, including Liu Jie, put to death under a false accusation that they conspired with the official Wang Sengchuo (王僧綽) to overthrow him. Because Liu Jie was sonless, after Liu Shao was defeated and killed by his brother Liu Jun the Prince of Wuling, who took the throne as Emperor Xiaowu, Liu Bing was created the Marquess of Xinyu to inherit his father's and brother's title.

== Service before the reign of Emperor Ming and under Emperor Ming ==
Little is known about the chronology of Liu Bing's subsequent activities until the reign of Emperor Ming, his second cousin, but he was promoted in rank throughout the years. After Emperor Ming became emperor in January 466 after his violent and arbitrary nephew Liu Ziye (Emperor Xiaowu's son) was assassinated, Liu Bing continued to be promoted. Because the imperial Liu clan then lacked people with talent, because Liu Bing was himself not particularly talented but was known for his studiousness and virtues, Emperor Ming favored him. By the end of Emperor Ming's reign, he was a powerful provincial governor.

== Service under Emperor Houfei ==
After Emperor Ming died in 472 and was succeeded by his son Emperor Houfei, initially, the governmental matters were in the hands of Yuan Can and Chu Yuan. Late in 472, Yuan and Chu promoted Liu Bing to join them in making important decisions, because it was considered appropriate to incorporate a member of the imperial clan into the decision-making process. During the rebellion of Emperor Houfei's uncle Liu Xiufan (劉休範) the Prince of Guiyang in 474, Liu Bing was given a general title as well, but did not appear to actually command troops. After Liu Xiufan's rebellion was suppressed by Xiao Daocheng, Liu Bing was created the greater title of Marquess of Dangyang, and he shared the decision-making process with Yuan, Chu, and Xiao.

In 477, Xiao Daocheng, fearful that the violent Emperor Houfei would kill him, engaged in a plot with Emperor Houfei's associates and had him assassinated. Xiao then forced Yuan and Liu Bing to effectively grant him near-imperial powers, leading to concerns that Xiao would next take the throne.

== Resistance against Xiao Daocheng and death ==
Xiao Daocheng made Emperor Houfei's brother Liu Zhun the Prince of Ancheng emperor (as Emperor Shun). In response, the general Shen Youzhi arose with the troops of his Jing Province (荊州, modern central and western Hubei), accusing Xiao of wanting to usurp the throne. Yuan and Liu Bing also believed that that was Xiao's intent, and, as Xiao prepared for a campaign against Shen, secretly planned another uprising within Jiankang to overthrow Xiao. However, Yuan, believing that the plot would not succeed without Chu Yuan's support, told Chu of the plot as well, and Chu, who was friendly with Xiao, quickly informed Xiao. Yuan, not aware of this, continued his preparations, aligning with a number of generals and preparing to rise. However, Liu Bing panicked during the preparation stage, and fled to Yuan's defense post at the fortress of Shitou Cheng several hours in advance of the scheduled time, alarming Xiao and allowing him to further start a counter-insurrection, arresting and killing several generals aligned with Yuan and Liu Bing before they could act. Xiao's troops then sieged Yuan's defenses at Shitou. Liu Bing and his sons fled, and Yuan and his son Yuan Zui (袁最), who stayed to try to protect his father, were killed in the battle by Xiao's subordinate Dai Sengjing (戴僧靜). Liu Bing and his sons were soon captured and executed. On 26 April 483, Xiao Daocheng's son Emperor Wu of Southern Qi, recognizing Liu Bing's faithfulness, reburied him with honors.
