= Shen Youzhi =

General during the Chinese Liu Song dynasty

Shen Youzhi (沈攸之) (died c.9 March 478), courtesy name Zhongda (仲達), (Note: Perhaps deliberately chosen, Shen Youzhi's courtesy name was the same as the great Cao Wei general Sima Yi, whose descendants founded Jin Dynasty (266–420).) was a general during the Chinese Liu Song dynasty, who, in the final moments of the dynasty, made a final failed attempt to prevent Xiao Daocheng from seizing the throne.

== Service under Emperors Wen and Xiaowu ==
It is not known when Shen Youzhi was born. However, it is known that his father Shen Shuren (沈叔仁) was an army officer under Emperor Wen's brother Liu Yiji (劉義季) the Prince of Hengyang and was a cousin of the famed general Shen Qingzhi (沈慶之). Shen Shuren's household was not rich, and he grew up in poverty after apparently losing his father early in life. In 450, when Northern Wei forces made a major invasion into Liu Song territory, Shen Youzhi was conscripted, and he went to see the general Liu Zunkao (劉遵考) to request a sergeant position. Liu was not impressed by his appearance and refused his request, so he went to follow his distance uncle Shen Qingzhi. However, Shen Qingzhi did not initially make him an officer either, and he did not become an officer until 452, when he followed Shen Qingzhi in a campaign against the Xiyang Aborigines (西陽蠻, located in modern Huanggang, Hubei).

In 453, Emperor Wen was assassinated by his crown prince Liu Shao, who then seized the throne. Instead of acquiescing to Liu Shao's reign, Shen Qingzhi persuaded Liu Shao's brother Liu Jun the Prince of Wuling into an uprising against Liu Shao. Shen Youzhi was part of Shen Youzhi's army against Liu Shao, and at the Battle of Xinting (新亭, in modern Nanjing, Jiangsu), near the capital Jiankang, he suffered severe injuries but recovered. After Liu Shao was defeated and killed and Liu Jun became emperor (as Emperor Xiaowu), Shen Youzhi was created the Marquess of Pingluo and promoted.

In 459, when Emperor Xiaowu's brother Liu Dan (劉誕) the Prince of Jingling rose against him, Shen Youzhi again joined Shen Qingzhi in the campaign against Liu Dan by besieging Liu Dan's post of Guangling (廣陵, in modern Yangzhou, Jiangsu), and he contributed to the victory over Liu Dan. Emperor Xiaowu wanted to reward him greatly, but Shen Qingzhi, perhaps because Shen Youzhi was a relative, reduced the award, and Shen Youzhi became resentful of Shen Qingzhi after this point.

== Service under Emperor Qianfei ==
In 464, Emperor Xiaowu died and was succeeded by his impulsive and violent son Emperor Qianfei. Emperor Qianfei, suspecting the high-level officials of conspiring against him, soon carried out a campaign of terror against them, and because he feared assassinations, he greatly endeared himself to a number of fierce army officers, including Shen Youzhi, Zong Yue (宗越), Tan Jin (譚金), and Tong Taiyi (童太一), making them command his personal guards. Shen, along with the others, participated in his slaughters of the high-level officials. After one such attack in winter 465 against Emperor Qianfei's uncle and brother-in-law He Mai (何邁), whose wife Liu Yingmei (劉英媚) the Princess Xincai Emperor Qianfei engaged in an incestuous relationship with, Shen Qingzhi tried to enter the palace to persuade Emperor Qianfei to change his ways, but was stopped by roadblocks that Emperor Qianfei had set up in anticipation of his attempt. Emperor Qianfei then ordered Shen Youzhi to deliver poison to Shen Qingzhi to force him to commit suicide. Shen Qingzhi refused to take the poison, and Shen Youzhi then suffocated him with a blanket on 6 December 465. In less than a month, however, while Shen and the other key officers Emperor Qianfei trusted were out of the palace, Emperor Qianfei's attendant Shou Jizhi (壽寂之) assassinated him, and Emperor Qianfei's uncle Liu Yu then took the throne as Emperor Ming.

== Service under Emperor Ming ==
Emperor Ming did not trust the guard officers that Emperor Qianfei had endeared, and he offered to give them commandery governor posts to get them to leave the palace. However, they were largely fearful that Emperor Ming had other intentions, and they entered into a plot against Emperor Ming. Shen Youzhi, however, informed Emperor Ming of the plot, and Emperor Ming then had those rebel officers executed, except for Shen, whom he began to trust and made him a guard commander again.

Meanwhile, Deng Wan (鄧琬), the chief of staff for Emperor Qianfei's brother Liu Zixun the Prince of Jin'an and governor of Jiang Province (江州, modern Jiangxi and Fujian), refused to accept Emperor Ming's offer to promote Liu Zixun, and instead started an uprising in Liu Zixun's name, declaring Liu Zixun emperor in spring 466. Soon, nearly the entire empire pledged loyalty to Liu Zixun, and Emperor Ming was left with control of only the several commanderies around Jiankang. However, Liu Zixun's forces proceeded slowly toward Jiankang, and Emperor Ming used the opportunity to gather his troops in preparation of a war. Shen Youzhi was one of the generals. After his commanding general Yin Xiaozu (殷孝祖) was killed in battle, initially his officers wanted Shen Youzhi to take over command of the army, but judging that another general, Jiang Faxing (江法興), would be unwilling to submit to him, Shen humbled himself and offered the command to Jiang, preserving unity of the forces. Shen Youzhi subsequently was particularly successful against Liu Zixun's general Liu Hu (劉胡), and his successes, combined with the successes of Zhang Xingshi (張興世), caused Liu Zixun's forces to collapse. In fall 466, Shen Youzhi arrived at Liu Zixun's headquarters at Xunyang (尋陽, in modern Jiujiang, Jiangxi), and he executed Liu Zixun and delivered his head to Jiankang, with Consort Chen mother of Zixun (presumably honored as empress dowager) executed as well. For his successes, Emperor Ming created him the Duke of Zhenyang.

Emperor Ming, however, made the crucial mistake of appearing not to accepting the pledge of allegiance of Xue Andu (薛安都), the governor of Xu Province (徐州, modern northern Jiangsu and northern Anhui), instead sending Shen and Zhang Yong (張永) north with troops, which frightened Xue and led him to surrender to Northern Wei. When Shen and Zhang subsequently arrived at Xue's headquarters at Pengcheng (彭城, in modern Xuzhou, Jiangsu), their siege of the city failed, forcing them to withdraw in early 467. They were pursued and then defeated by Xue and the Northern Wei general Yuchi Yuan (尉遲元), suffering extreme losses. In fall 467, against Shen's advice, Emperor Ming ordered Shen to again attack Pengcheng, and he was again defeated by Yuchi's forces. He suffered major injuries in the battle, but was able to escape.

In 469, Emperor Ming made Shen the governor of Ying Province (郢州, modern eastern Hubei), and there, he began to build up a personal army which he hoped would be loyal to him.

In 472, Emperor Ming died and was succeeded by his son Emperor Houfei.

== Service under Emperor Houfei ==
Emperor Houfei's administration was initially dominated by Emperor Ming's associates Wang Daolong (王道隆) and Ruan Dianfu (阮佃夫), who distrusted the strict governor of the important Jing Province (荊州, modern central and western Hubei), Cai Xingzong (蔡興宗). They therefore recalled Cai to the capital and moved Shen from Ying Province to Jing Province. According to historical records written in the subsequent Southern Qi Dynasty, Shen effectively made Jing Province into a personal domain, disregarding imperial directives, and saving resources in preparation of eventual war. He was said to be temperamental and austere but talented, and his subordinates feared him and did not dare to hide truths from him. It was also said that the social order was so well maintained that people could sleep at night without closing doors.

In 474, when Emperor Houfei's uncle Liu Xiufan (劉休範) the Prince of Guiyang declared a rebellion, he manufactured a prophecy in which Shen Youzhi was referred to was prime minister, and had the prophetic writing delivered to Shen, who however declined to join his rebellion, and subsequently aligned with Wang Sengqian (王僧虔) the governor of Xiang Province (湘州, modern Hunan), Zhang Xingshi the governor of Yong Province (雍州, modern northwestern Hubei and southwestern Henan), and the chief of staff of Liu Xie (劉燮) the Prince of Jinxi and governor of Ying Province to attack Liu Xiufan's base at Xunyang, forcing Xunyang's surrender and killing Liu Xiufan's two sons. Liu Xiufan, meanwhile, while sieging Jiankang, was killed by assassins sent by the general Xiao Daocheng, and his rebellion collapsed.

In the aftermath of Liu Xiufan's defeat, the high-level officials wanted to recall Shen to the capital, but did not dare to do so without his agreement in fear of causing him to rebel, and so sent messenger in the name of Emperor Ming's wife Empress Dowager Wang to try to persuade Shen to accept a promotion and a recall. Shen declined, and the high-level officials permitted him to remain at Jing Province. However, concerned about Shen, Xiao, who had been friendly with Shen up to this point – so much so that Shen Youzhi's son Shen Wenhe (沈文和) married Xiao's daughter – sent the general who had assassinated Liu Xiufan, Zhang Jing'er (張敬兒), to be the governor of Yong Province in 475, to prepare for an eventual betrayal of Shen. Shen tried to foster a relationship with Zhang, and believed incorrectly that he had won Zhang over to his side, but Zhang remained secretly still loyal to Xiao. In 476, when Emperor Houfei's cousin Liu Jingsu (劉景素) the Prince of Jianping and governor of South Xu Province (南徐州, modern western central Jiangsu) rebelled, it was rumored that Shen was aligned with Liu Jingsu, and he tried to show his loyalty by sending an army to aid Xiao and other imperial generals against Liu Jingsu, although by the time his forces arrived at Jiankang, Liu Jingsu had already been defeated.

Emperor Houfei was a violent and unpredictable teenage emperor, and he often killed whoever he encountered. On one occasion, he was set to kill Xiao, and Xiao then engaged Emperor Houfei's attendants to kill him. On the night of Qi Xi in 477, Emperor Houfei's attendant Yang Yufu (楊玉夫) did so, and Xiao took effective control of the imperial government, making Emperor Houfei's younger brother Liu Zhun the Prince of Ancheng emperor (as Emperor Shun).

== Uprising against Xiao Daocheng ==
Shen Youzhi often claimed that he had entered into a secret oath with Emperor Ming, written on white silk that he then sewed into his vest. Upon hearing of Emperor Houfei's death, his staff members Zong Yanzhi (宗儼之) and Zang Yin (臧寅) both tried to persuade him to start an uprising immediately against Xiao, but Shen failed to do so because his oldest son Shen Yuanyan (沈元琰) was still in Jiankang. Xiao then subsequently sent Shen Yuanyan to Shen Youzhi, along with weapons that Emperor Houfei had used to slice his victims open, to Shen Youzhi to explain the reasons why he had Emperor Houfei assassinated. However, Shen was still displeased that Xiao had taken over the government, and he stated that he would rather be like the Cao Wei general Wang Ling, who had unsuccessfully tried to overthrow Sima Yi, than be Jia Chong, who submitted to and served Sima Yi's sons Sima Shi and Sima Zhao and grandson Emperor Wu of Jin. However, he still could not immediately start his uprising, but kept Shen Yuanyan at Jing Province.

Soon, claiming that he had received secret instructions from Empress Dowager Wang, hidden in a pair of candles, Shen did announce a rebellion, accusing Xiao of intending to usurp the throne. However, the provincial governors whom he invited to join him all declined and either resisted him or stood by. Shen nevertheless had a strong army, and the imperial army generals were apprehensive about facing him. He initially progressed quickly toward Jiankang, but as he passed Yingcheng (郢城, in modern Wuhan, Hubei), he was provoked by insults of Liu Shilong (柳世隆), the chief of staff for Liu Zan (劉贊) the Prince of Wuling and governor of Ying Province into stopping and laying siege to the well-fortified city. Meanwhile, Xiao had Shen Qingzhi's son Shen Wenji (沈文季) arrest Shen Youzhi's brother Shen Dengzhi (沈登之) and execute Shen Youzhi's clan, to avenge Shen Qingzhi.

In 478, with his forces unable to capture Yingcheng, Shen Youzhi's soldiers began to desert. Shen then aggravated the situation by imposing severe punishments on the commanding officers of deserting soldiers – which in turn caused them to desert. Shen's officer Liu Rangbing (劉攘兵) then surrendered to Liu Shilong, causing his forces to collapse. He tried to retreat to Jiangling (the capital of Jing Province), but by the time he did so, Zhang Jing'er had already captured Jiangling and killed Shen Yuanyan, whom Shen Youzhi had left in charge of Jiangling. Shen's remaining army, seeing that Jiangling had fallen, collapsed, and he initially tried to flee, but realizing that his escape route had been cut off, committed suicide along with his son Shen Wenhe (沈文和). His other sons were killed by Zhang Jing'er. On 26 April 483, Xiao Daocheng's son Emperor Wu of Southern Qi, recognizing Shen Youzhi's accomplishments, permitted him to be reburied with proper honors. (Note: Yuan Can and Liu Bing received similar honours on the same day.)
