= Yuan Can =

Liu Song dynasty official (420–477)

- Chinese: 袁粲
Transcriptions
Standard Mandarin
- Hanyu Pinyin: Yuán Càn
- Wade–Giles: Yüan Tsan

Yuan Minsun
- Traditional Chinese: 袁愍孫
- Simplified Chinese: 袁愍孙
Transcriptions
Standard Mandarin
- Hanyu Pinyin: Yuán Mǐnsūn
- Wade–Giles: Yüan Min-sun

Jingqian (courtesy name)
- Chinese: 景倩
Transcriptions
Standard Mandarin
- Hanyu Pinyin: Jǐngqiàn
- Wade–Giles: Ching-chien

Yuan Can (c. 420 – 12 January 478), originally named Yuan Minsun, courtesy name Jingqian, was a high-level official of the Liu Song dynasty who, near the end of the dynasty, made a futile attempt to prevent the general Xiao Daocheng from gaining sufficient power to take the imperial throne.

== Background ==
Then-Yuan Minsun was born in 420 into an aristocratic clan, albeit not one that was always powerful. His uncle Yuan Shu (袁淑) was a general who later was praised for having died in a futile attempt in 453 to stop Emperor Wen's crown prince Liu Shao from assassinating Emperor Wen. His father Yuan Zhuo (袁濯) died early before becoming an official； his grandmother, in mourning, named her grandson Minsun, meaning "a child born into disaster." While Yuan Minsun's uncles were famed officials and generals, his household was poor. His mother Lady Wang, while hailing from a clan that was even higher in status, had to sew to maintain the household. Yuan Minsun was known for studiousness and virtues. As a result, he was much favored by his uncle Yuan Xun (袁洵); whenever officials wanted to consider marrying their daughters to Yuan Xun's son Yuan Yi (袁顗), Yuan Xun would always state, "Yuan Yi is not worthy of you. Consider Yuan Minsun."

== Service under Emperor Xiaowu ==
After Yuan Minsun became an adult, he served on the staff of Emperor Wen's son Liu Jun the Prince of Wuling. When Liu Shao assassinated Emperor Wen in 453, Liu Jun rose to oppose him, and Yuan participated in the strategy. After Liu Jun defeated Liu Shao and took the throne himself (as Emperor Xiaowu), Yuan served in the imperial administration, but after he was accused of eating fish and pork during a vegetarian fast that Emperor Xiaowu held, he was removed from his post. Although he returned to the government sometime after, throughout Emperor Xiaowu's reign, he would never hold a high-level post.

== Service under Emperor Ming ==
After the reigns of Emperor Xiaowu and his son Emperor Qianfei, Emperor Xiaowu's brother Emperor Ming became emperor in January 466. He had higher opinion of Yuan Minsun, and he gradually promoted him. It was during Emperor Ming's reign that Yuan, who admired the Three Kingdoms-era scholar Xun Can, obtained permission from Emperor Ming to change his name from Minsun to Can. (He also gave himself the courtesy name Jingqian (景倩), to show further admiration for Xun Can, whose courtesy name was Fengqian (奉倩).) He was also famed for his display of humility, often declining promotions several times before accepting.

== Service under Emperor Houfei ==
Emperor Ming died in 472, leaving the throne to his young son Emperor Houfei. Emperor Ming's will entrusted the governmental matters to Yuan Can and Chu Yuan, and the two of them tried to reform government to eliminate corruption, but were prevented from doing so by Emperor Ming's attendants Ruan Dianfu (阮佃夫) and Wang Daolong (王道隆), who remained powerful even after his death. In winter 472, Yuan and Chu also incorporated Emperor Ming's cousin Liu Bing into the decision process. In 473, Yuan Can's mother died, and he left the government to observe a three-year mourning period for her. (It was at this juncture that Yuan's relationship with Chu deteriorated, as years earlier, when Chu's mother died, Yuan had, on orders from the emperor, persuaded him from abandoning the mourning period, but now would not reciprocally accept Chu's entreaties to return to the government—thus making his own reputation greater than Chu's, causing Chu to be displeased.) He did, however, return to the government on an emergency basis after Emperor Qianfei's uncle Liu Xiufan (劉休範) the Prince of Guiyang rebelled and attacked the capital Jiankang, and he later participated in a final battle in which the imperial troops, mostly under the command of Xiao Daocheng, defeated Liu Xiufan's troops. He thereafter remained in the imperial government, and, with Xiao also now included in the decision process after his victory, became known as one of the "four nobles" (四貴) along with Chu, Liu Bing, and Xiao.

In 477, Emperor Houfei, by now aged 14, was growing increasingly impulsive and violent, often wandering outside the palace with his guards and killing all people or animals they encountered. One day, he suddenly charged into Xiao's headquarters, and saw Xiao sleeping naked. He was intrigued by the large size of Xiao's belly, and he woke Xiao up, drew a target on Xiao's belly, and prepared to shoot Xiao with arrows. Xiao pleaded for his life, and Emperor Houfei's attendant Wang Tian'en (王天恩) pointed out that if he killed Xiao with an arrow, he would lose Xiao's belly as a wonderful target—and so at Wang's suggestion, Emperor Houfei shot Xiao with bone-made round-point arrows and was pleased when he was able to target Xiao's navel successfully. Xiao became fearful after the incident, and he initially discussed with Yuan and Chu the possibilities of deposing the emperor, but could not get them to go along with his plan. Xiao therefore acted on his own, associating with Emperor Houfei's attendants, and eventually getting one of them, Yang Yufu (楊玉夫), to kill Emperor Houfei while Emperor Houfei was asleep. Xiao then forced Yuan and Liu Bing to effectively grant him near-imperial powers, leading to concerns that Xiao would next take the throne.

== Resistance against Xiao Daocheng and death ==
Xiao Daocheng made Emperor Houfei's younger brother Liu Zhun the Prince of Ancheng emperor (as Emperor Shun). In response, the general Shen Youzhi arose with the troops of his Jing Province (荊州, modern central and western Hubei), accusing Xiao of wanting to usurp the throne. Yuan and Liu Bing also believed that that was Xiao's intent, and, as Xiao prepared for a campaign against Shen, secretly planned another uprising within Jiankang to overthrow Xiao. However, Yuan, believing that the plot would not succeed without Chu Yuan's support, told Chu of the plot as well, and Chu, who was friendly with Xiao, quickly informed Xiao. Yuan, not aware of this, continued his preparations, aligning with a number of generals and preparing to rise. However, Liu Bing panicked during the preparation stage, and fled to Yuan's defense post at the fortress of Shitou Cheng several hours in advance of the scheduled time, alarming Xiao and allowing him to further start a counter-insurrection, arresting and killing several generals aligned with Yuan and Liu Bing before they could act. Xiao's troops then besieged Yuan's defenses at Shitou. Liu Bing and his sons fled, and Yuan and his son Yuan Zui (袁最), who stayed to try to protect his father, were killed in the battle by Xiao's subordinate Dai Sengjing (戴僧靜) -- and it was said that as they neared death, Yuan Can stated, "I have been a faithful subject, and you have been a filial son." On 26 April 483, Xiao Daocheng's son and successor Emperor Wu of Southern Qi, recognizing Yuan's faithfulness, reburied him with honors.

== Commentaries about Yuan Can ==
Yuan was largely praised in history for his faithfulness—that even the son of his enemy Xiao Daocheng recognized. However, historians were also critical for his failing to rule the imperial government well, allowing Xiao's meteoric rise in absence of effective leadership. The historian Sima Guang, the author of the Zizhi Tongjian, wrote:

Yuan was a simple man who lived a plain life, lacking the abilities to lead the government and rule the state. He favored drinking and liked writing and reading poems. He bore great responsibilities, but was unwilling to be concerned with mundane matters. When the agencies requested his rulings on important matters, he would even at times read poems as responses. When he was free, he slept, and he only associated with nobles, lacking the ability to establish relationships with others, and so he was defeated.

Sima further cited the criticism from another historian, Pei Ziye (裴子野), who wrote:

Yuan was one of the most admired men in the state. He bore great responsibilities, but his abilities were insufficient to wipe out evil, and his wisdom was insufficient to handle changing situations. The imperial administration became fallow and disorganized, and as the state faced dangers, he was unable to bear the weight. As the Lius' nine heavy dings floated from the depths to the surface, and the talented Xiaos took over, Yuan trapped himself in a small fortress, facing ten thousand deaths and not willing to flee from them. This was only the faithfulness of one man, and not the kind of abilities expected of the support of the state.
