= Latter Deposed Emperor of Liu Song =

Liu Yu 劉昱

Emperor of Liu Song
- Reign: 11 May 472 – 1 August 477
- Predecessor: Emperor Ming
- Successor: Emperor Shun
- Born: Liu Huizhen (劉慧震); 1 March 463
- Died: 1 August 477 (aged 14); Jiankang, Liu Song
- Consorts: Jiang Jiangui of Jiyang
Names
- Liú Yù (劉昱); Courtesy name: Derong (德融); Childhood name: Huizhen (慧震)
Era name and dates
- Yuán huī (元徽): 473-477
Posthumous name
- None, "Hòu Fèi" (後廢, lit. "latter deposed") traditionally used as alternative
- Father: Emperor Ming
- Mother: Chen Miaodeng

The Latter Deposed Emperor of Liu Song (Chinese: (劉)宋後廢帝, also known as Houfeidi; 1 March 463), – 1 August 477 also known by his posthumously demoted title of Prince of Cangwu (蒼梧王), personal name Liu Yu (劉昱), courtesy name Derong (德融), childhood name Huizhen (慧震), was the eighth emperor of the Liu Song dynasty of China.

During his brief reign as a boy emperor, he showed a knack for violence and arbitrariness, and in 477 he was killed by his general Xiao Daocheng, who made Houfeidi's brother Liu Zhun emperor but seized the throne in 479, ending Liu Song and starting Southern Qi.

== Background ==
Liu Yu was born in 463, when his father Liu Xiubing was the Prince of Xiangdong under his uncle Emperor Xiaowu. He was the oldest son of the Prince of Xiangdong, and his mother was the concubine Consort Chen Miaodeng. (Note: The Prince of Xiangdong had earlier disfavored Lady Chen and given her to his attendant Li Dao'er (李道兒) and then taken her back, and therefore there was constant rumor that his son's biological father was actually Li, not him.) His courtesy name of Huizhen came from the I Ching, which the Prince of Xiangdong used extensively for divination.

After the Prince of Xiangdong became emperor (as Emperor Ming) after the assassination of his nephew Emperor Qianfei (Emperor Xiaowu's son) in 465, he created Liu Yu crown prince in 466 (although the name "Yu" was not actually settled on until 467). As the Crown Prince grew, he was known as an overly active child who liked carrying out dangerous tasks, such as climbing flag poles, and he had severe mood swings and was so impulsive that his attendants could not stop him from taking violent actions. Emperor Ming often had his mother Consort Chen beat him as punishment. In 470, Emperor Ming set up a separate household for the Crown Prince, as per tradition for crown princes.

In 472, Emperor Ming died, and Crown Prince Yu took the throne as emperor with the era name Yuanhui at the age of nine. He honored Emperor Ming's wife Empress Wang Zhenfeng as empress dowager and his mother Consort Chen as "Consort Dowager."

== Reign ==
After Houfeidi ascended the throne, the government was technically in the hands of two high level officials whom Emperor Ming had entrusted Houfeidi to, Chu Yuan and Yuan Can. However, the close associates of Emperor Ming, led by Ruan Dianfu (阮佃夫) and Wang Daolong (王道隆), continued to be powerful behind the scenes and influential, and Chu and Yuan were unable to curb their powers. Chu and Yuan soon added Houfeidi's distant relative Liu Bing to their own rank to be involved in important decisions. In 473, Yuan's mother died, and he left the government to observe the three-year mourning period.

One crisis that Houfeidi's administration needed to deal with almost immediately was that Houfeidi's single remaining paternal uncle, Liu Xiufan (劉休範) the Prince of Guiyang and the governor of Jiang Province (江州, modern Jiangxi and Fujian), was becoming displeased that he was not made prime minister, as the emperor's uncle. (Note: Emperor Ming, because he had been apprehensive about his brothers taking power after his death, had killed all of his remaining brothers in 471, except for Liu Xiufan, because he had considered Liu Xiufan incompetent and therefore not much of a threat.) In summer 474, Liu Xiufan declared a rebellion, accusing Wang Daolong and another associate of Emperor Ming, Yang Yunchang (楊運長), of having wrongly instigated the death of Liu Xiuren (劉休仁) the Prince of Jian'an and Liu Xiuruo (劉休若) the Prince of Baling. Taking lesson from past rebellions that had failed because they had proceeded too slowly, Liu Xiufan ordered his troops to advance on the capital Jiankang as quickly as possible, and it took only five days for them to arrive at Jiankang. The general Xiao Daocheng volunteered to face Liu Xiufan's forces, and while Liu Xiufan's forces were initially able to prevail over Xiao's, the battles were not particularly decisive. Meanwhile, Xiao was offered a plan of deception by his subordinates Huang Hui (黃回) and Zhang Jing'er (張敬兒) -- that they would pretend to surrender to Liu Xiufan and then assassinate him, and he agreed with it. Huang and Zhang then pretended to surrender to Liu Xiufan, but then took the opportunity to kill him. However, Liu Xiufan's troops were not aware that Liu Xiufan was dead, and they initially continued fighting. Indeed, Liu Xiufan's general Ding Wenhao (丁文豪) soon engaged and defeated the forces under Wang Daolong's and Liu Mian (劉勔), killing Wang and Liu Mian, and then put the palace under siege. Eventually, though, Ding's forces became aware that Liu Xiufan had died, and began to collapse on their own. Xiao and Yuan Can (who had returned to the government in light of the emergency) then defeated Liu Xiufan's remaining troops, ending the rebellion. In light of the victory, Xiao was promoted to be part of the decision-making nucleus, along with Yuan, Chu, and Liu Bing.

Meanwhile, Houfeidi had begun to develop a reputation of being crazed and lacking in virtue. The people instead were hopeful that his cousin Liu Jingsu (劉景素) the Prince of Jianping, who was an adult and was considered a kind and generous man, could become emperor. Many army officers were hoping to join a rebellion by Liu Jingsu, while Yang Yunchang and Ruan Dianfu, who wanted to hold onto power, wanted to eliminate Liu Jingsu as a potential threat. In 475, they wanted to act on an accusation that Liu Jingsu was plotting rebellion and arrest him, but were stopped from doing so by Yuan and Xiao. In summer 476, however, one of the army officers who was hopeful for a Liu Jingsu rebellion fled to Liu Jingsu's headquarters at Jingkou (京口, in modern Zhenjiang, Jiangsu), falsely telling Liu Jingsu that Jiankang was in disarray and that he needed to quickly proceed to Jiankang and take the throne. Liu Jingsu therefore started his uprising, but his forces lacked good generals. Meanwhile, Xiao sent Huang Hui to attack Liu Jingsu, and Huang, while secretly sympathetic of Liu Jingsu's cause, was hesitant to turn against Xiao because his lieutenants were all Xiao's confidants, and he defeated Liu Jingsu, who was captured and killed.

By 477, Houfeidi's reputation was one that was feared and despised, for by this point Empress Dowager Wang and Consort Dowager Chen had completely lost control of him, and he was doing everything that he pleased. His guard corps would accompany him, and they killed humans and animals alike that they encountered, often in cruel manners. The emperor, indeed, would personally cut the victims open, and if he did not kill on a given day, he would appear depressed for the day. Because he was leaving and returning to the palace at all times during day or night, the palace guards would not dare to lock the palace gates, leaving palace defenses open. The situation was getting sufficiently severe that even Ruan, who had wanted to keep Houfeidi in power, instead plotted to depose him, but was discovered and executed. When the emperor subsequently received reports that the officials Du Youwen (杜幼文), Shen Bo (沈勃), and Sun Chaozhi (孫超之) were part of Ruan's conspiracy, he led his guards and personally executed Du, Shen, Sun, and their households, cutting the bodies to pieces, including even infants.

On one particular day, Houfeidi charged into Xiao Daocheng's headquarters and saw Xiao sleeping naked. He was intrigued by the large size of Xiao's belly, and he woke Xiao up, drew a target on Xiao's belly, and prepared to shoot Xiao with arrows. Xiao pleaded for his life, and Houfeidi's attendant Wang Tian'en (王天恩) pointed out that if he killed Xiao with an arrow, he would lose Xiao's belly as a wonderful target. At Wang's suggestion, Houfeidi shot Xiao with bone-made round-point arrows and was pleased when he was able to target Xiao's bellybutton successfully. Xiao became fearful after the incident, and he initially discussed with Yuan and Chu the possibilities of deposing the emperor, but could not get them to go along with his plan. Instead, he independently planned with a number of his associates, and he also entered into agreements with a number of the emperor's attendants. On the night of Qi Xi in 477, the attendant Yang Yufu (楊玉夫), whom Houfeidi had previously threatened to kill, cut off Houfeidi's head while he was asleep, and delivered the head to Xiao via Xiao's subordinate Wang Jingze (王敬則). Xiao immediately went to the palace with the emperor's head in possession—and the palace guards had been so terrified by the dead emperor that they were supposed to protect, there was no mourning but great rejoicing. Xiao issued an edict in the name of Empress Dowager Wang legitimizing the assassination and posthumously demoting Houfeidi to the title of Prince of Cangwu, while making Houfeidi's younger brother Liu Zhun the Prince of Ancheng emperor (as Emperor Shun). (Note: According to later accusations by Shen Youzhi while starting an uprising against Xiao, Xiao also exposed Houfeidi's body to the elements so that it became infested by maggots, although it is not clear whether Shen's accusation had a basis in fact.)

== Consorts ==
- Princess consort, of the Jiang clan of Jiyang (王妃 濟陽江氏; b. 461), personal name Jiangui (簡圭)

== Notes ==
Regnal titles
Preceded by Emperor Ming of Song	Emperor of Liu Song; 472–477	Succeeded by Emperor Shun of Song
