= Emperor Shun of Song =

Emperor Shun of Song 宋順帝

Emperor of Liu Song
- Reign: 5 August 477 – 27 May 479
- Predecessor: Emperor Houfei
- Successor: None (dynasty abolished)
- Born: Liu Zhiguan (劉智觀); 8 August 469
- Died: 23 June 479 (aged 9)
- Burial: Suining Mausoleum (遂寧陵)
- Consorts: Xie Fanjing of Chen
Names
- Liú Zhǔn (劉準); Courtesy name: Zhongmou (仲謀); Childhood name: Zhiguan (智觀)
Era name and dates
- Shēng míng (昇明): 477-479
Posthumous name
- Emperor Shun (順皇帝)
- Father: Emperor Ming
- Mother: Consort Chen Farong

Emperor Shun of (Liu) Song (Chinese: (劉)宋順帝; 8 August 469 – 23 June 479), personal name Liu Zhun (劉準), courtesy name Zhongmou (仲謀), childhood name Zhiguan (智觀), was the ninth and last emperor of the Liu Song dynasty of China during the Southern dynasties era. He became emperor in August 477 after his violent older brother Emperor Houfei was assassinated by his attendant at the instigation of the general Xiao Daocheng, but in his brief reign he was effectively Xiao's puppet. In 479, Xiao forced him to yield the throne to Xiao, ending Liu Song and starting Southern Qi. Later that year, the former Emperor Shun was killed by guards who were supposed to protect him, and the Liu clan was soon slaughtered as well.

== Background ==
Liu Zhun was born in August 469. Ostensibly, his parents were Emperor Ming and Emperor Ming's concubine Consort Chen Farong—but history does not provide a conclusive account of his actual parentage. Historical accounts, written during the succeeding Southern Qi dynasty, (Note: i.e. the Book of Song by Shen Yue. The History of the Southern Dynasties and Zizhi Tongjian also adopted the same account. In his Zizhi Tongjian Kaoyi, Sima Guang wrote that the edition of Book of Song which he reviewed recorded that instead of being killed, the concubines who bore sons would be imprisoned in secret jails; Tongjian thus adopted the account found in Summary of Song (by Pei Ziye).) indicate that Emperor Ming was impotent, and that although he had 12 sons, those were the results of his having seized his brothers' pregnant concubines and kept the children if they bore males, or his having had his concubines have sexual relations with others. (Note: However, the fact that Emperor Ming's wife Empress Wang Zhenfeng had two daughters, although no sons, may argue against such allegations, because it appeared rather unlikely that Emperor Ming would do this over female children—indeed, the allegations stated that he would only do this if his brothers' concubines bore males—or that the morally upright Empress Wang would engage in sexual relations with others, thus suggesting that the allegations were made to delegitimize Emperor Ming's sons Emperor Houfei and Liu Zhun vis-à-vis Southern Qi.) Those accounts allege that his biological father was Emperor Ming's brother Liu Xiufan (劉休範) the Prince of Guiyang, and his biological mother was a concubine of Liu Xiufan. In any case, whether he was born of Consort Chen or not, she raised him. In 471, he was created the Prince of Ancheng.

After Emperor Ming's death in 472, Liu Zhun's older brother Liu Yu the Crown Prince became emperor (as Emperor Houfei). Liu Zhun himself was made the governor of the important capital region, Yang Province (揚州, modern Zhejiang and southern Jiangsu), but actual governance was carried out by his staff members. In 474, after Liu Xiufan rebelled and besieged the capital Jiankang, the official Chu Cheng (褚澄) seized Liu Zhun and surrendered Liu Zhun's headquarters to Liu Xiufan's army, claiming that Liu Xiufan had declared Liu Zhun to be his son. (Liu Xiufan himself made no such public declaration before his death.) However, Chu Cheng did not know that assassins sent by Emperor Houfei's general Xiao Daocheng had already killed Liu Xiufan; when Liu Xiufan's army found out that he was already dead, it collapsed. Liu Zhun was not harmed.

By 477, Emperor Houfei had shown himself to be a cruel and violent ruler, often roving outside the palace with his guards and killing any person or animal that they encountered. Xiao, in fear of being killed by Emperor Houfei, engaged his associates to have him assassinated, and then used his personal control of the army to effectively force other high-level officials Yuan Can and Liu Bing to grant him near-imperial powers. He then made Liu Zhun emperor (as Emperor Shun), but the 10-year-old emperor was little more than Xiao's puppet.

== Reign ==
Upon hearing of Emperor Houfei's death, the general Shen Youzhi accused Xiao Daocheng of wanting to usurp the throne, and he started a rebellion from his Jing Province (荊州, modern central and western Hubei), although he then ill-advisedly became bogged down in his progress in besieging Yingcheng (郢城, in modern Wuhan, Hubei). Meanwhile, an attempted coup by Yuan Can and Liu Bing to seize back power for the imperial clan failed in late 477, and both Yuan and Liu Bing were killed, permitting Xiao to further consolidate his power. By spring 478, Shen also had been defeated, and he committed suicide. Xiao no longer had opposition. He began to have himself bestowed with higher and higher offices and honors, posturing himself for the throne. He was also gradually assassinating some of Emperor Shun's brothers.

In winter 478, Emperor Shun took Xie Fanjing, the granddaughter of the official Xie Zhuang (謝莊), as his wife and empress.

In 479, Xiao first had Emperor Shun create him the Duke of Qi and grant him the nine bestowments, and then create him the Prince of Qi. In summer 479, Xiao was prepared to seize the throne, and he prepared a ceremony at which Emperor Shun was to ascend a high platform and issue an edict giving the throne to him. However, the 12-year-old Emperor Shun was fearful, and he hid under a statue of a buddha, crying. Xiao sent his general Wang Jingze (王敬則) into the palace, and Empress Dowager Wang, fearful of what the consequences might be, personally led the eunuchs to search for Emperor Shun as well, finally finding him. Wang Jingze calmed Emperor Shun with false promises, finally getting him to get on the wagon that Wang Jingze prepared. He asked Wang, "Are you going to kill me?" Wang responded, "I will not kill you -- just letting you live elsewhere. Do not be sad -- this is what your Liu clan did to the Sima clan as well." (Note: This was a reference to how Emperor Shun's great-grandfather Emperor Wu had seized the throne from the Eastern Jin dynasty.) Emperor Shun resumed crying, and said, "When I am reincarnated, may it be that I will never be again reborn in an emperor's household!" Wang brought Emperor Shun to the platform and had him complete the ceremony. Xiao accepted the throne, ending Liu Song and starting Southern Qi (as its Emperor Gao).

== Death ==
Xiao Daocheng created Liu Zhun the Prince of Ruyin (汝阴王) and built him a mansion in the vicinity of the capital Jiankang, but put him under heavy guard. Less than a month after Xiao's taking of the throne, someone rode a horse near Liu Zhun's mansion, and the guards mistook the situation as someone wanting to seize Liu Zhun and start a rebellion, so they killed Liu Zhun themselves. Xiao not only did not punish them, but instead awarded them, and subsequently started a slaughter of the Liu clan. He did, however, bury the former emperor with imperial honors.

== Consorts ==
- Empress, of the Xie clan of Chen (皇后 陳郡謝氏; b. 466), personal name Fanjing (梵境)

== Notes ==
Chinese royalty
Preceded by Emperor Houfei of Liu Song	Emperor of Liu Song; 477–479	Dynasty ended
Preceded by Emperor Houfei of Liu Song	Emperor of China (Southern); 477–479	Succeeded by Emperor Gao of Southern Qi
