= Emperor Ming of Song =

Liu Song Emperor from 466 to 472

Emperor Ming of Song 宋明帝

Emperor of Liu Song
- Reign: 9 January 466 – 10 May 472
- Predecessor: Emperor Qianfei
- Successor: Emperor Houfei
- Pretender: Liu Zixun (from 7 February 466 to 19 September 466)
- Born: Liu Rongqi (劉榮期); 9 December 439
- Died: 10 May 472 (aged 32); Jiankang, Liu Song
- Burial: Gaoning Mausoleum (高寧陵)
- Consorts: Empress Minggong
- Issue: Liu Yu; Liu Zhun; Princess Jinling; Princess Jian'an; Princess Yangxian
Names
- Liú Yù (劉彧) courtesy name: Xiubing (休炳); Childhood name: Rongqi (榮期)
Era dates
- Tàishǐ (泰始): 465-471; Tàiyù (泰豫): 472
Posthumous name
- Emperor Ming (明皇帝)
Temple name
- Taizong (太宗)
- Father: Emperor Wen
- Mother: Empress Dowager Xuan

Emperor Ming of Liu Song ((劉)宋明帝; 9 December 439 (Note: According to Emperor Ming's biography in Book of Song, he was born on the wuyin day of the 10th month of the 16th year of the Yuanjia era of his father Liu Yilong's reign. This corresponds to 9 Dec 439 in the Julian calendar.) – 10 May 472 (Note: According to Emperor Ming's biography in Book of Song, he fell gravely ill on the jihai day of the 4th month of the 1st year of the Taiyu era of his reign, and later died aged 34 (by East Asian reckoning) on the same day. This corresponds to 10 May 472 on the Julian calendar.)), personal name Liu Yu (劉彧), courtesy name Xiubing (休炳), childhood name Rongqi (榮期), was the seventh emperor of the Liu Song dynasty of China. He became emperor after his violent and impulsive nephew Liu Ziye was assassinated in January 466, as he was regarded as more lenient and open-minded at first. However, he soon turned cruel and suspicious as well after becoming emperor, and during his reign, his nephews and brothers were nearly all slaughtered on his orders. This greatly weakened the Liu Song dynasty and contributing to its fall in 479, just seven years after his death.

== Background ==
Liu Yu was born in 439, as Emperor Wen's 11th son. His mother Consort Shen Rongji (沈容姬) was a low-ranked imperial consort with the title Meiren (美人). For reasons unknown, Wen once wanted to put her to death, but she convinced him that killing her would offend the spirit of his deceased wife, Empress Yuan Qigui, and she was spared. In 448, Liu Yu was created the Prince of Huaiyang. In 452, his title was changed to Prince of Xiangdong. Consort Shen died in 453, the same year that Emperor Wen was assassinated by his crown prince Liu Shao, who took over as emperor and subsequently put a number of his brothers, including Liu Yu, under house arrest, but Liu Yu and the other brothers were released when another older brother, Liu Jun the Prince of Wuling, defeated and killed Liu Shao and took the throne himself (as Emperor Xiaowu). Emperor Xiaowu posthumously honored Liu Yu's mother Consort Shen as Princess Dowager of Xiangdong, and Emperor Xiaowu's mother Empress Dowager Lu Huinan took over the duties of raising Liu Yu to adulthood. As he grew, as was customary for Liu Song imperial princes, he was rotated through governorships of commanderies and provinces. Liu Yu was regarded as a kind and open-minded man, with substantial literary abilities. He was also said to be grossly overweight.

== During Emperor Qianfei's reign ==
In 464, Emperor Xiaowu died, and was succeeded by his son Emperor Qianfei. Emperor Qianfei was impulsive and violent, and he, after discovering and brutally suppressing a plot to depose him in favor of his granduncle Liu Yigong (劉義恭) the Prince of Jiangxia, suspected his uncles as well, and had them returned to the capital and confined. Of his uncles, he particularly suspected Liu Yu, Liu Xiuren (劉休仁) the Prince of Jian'an, and Liu Xiuyou (劉休祐) the Prince of Shanyang, since they were the oldest. Another even older uncle, Liu Hui (劉褘) the Prince of Donghai, was considered so unintelligent that Emperor Qianfei did not view him as much of a threat.

Because these three princes were all overweight, he had them put in cages and weighed as if they were pigs. As Liu Yu was the heaviest, he called Liu Yu the Prince of Pigs, Liu Xiuren the Prince of Murderers, and Liu Xiuyou the Prince of Thieves. He often humiliated Liu Yu by putting him in stables and feeding him the way that pigs would be fed. He wanted to kill Liu Yu, Liu Xiuren, and Liu Xiuyiu, but each time Liu Xiuren flattered him and caused him to change his mind. In one particular incident, he tied Liu Yu up like how a pig would be tied up, and had him delivered to the kitchen, stating "Today is pig-killing day." Liu Xiuren, however, said "This is not the pig-killing day." He angrily asked Liu Xiuren why that was the case, and Liu Xiuren stated: "Wait after your son is born, then kill the pig and take out his entrails!" Emperor Qianfei liked Liu Xiuren's joke and spared Liu Yu.

In winter 465, around the time that Emperor Qianfei made his second wife, Lady Lu, empress, there weren't enough palace eunuchs to prepare for the ceremony, so Emperor Qianfei called for the eunuchs from the princes' mansions to come over to help. Liu Yu sent his own personal eunuch, Qian Lansheng (錢藍生), to observe Emperor Qianfei's actions and report to him. Meanwhile, some attendants of Emperor Qianfei were plotting to kill him. When the emperor was carrying out a ghost-shooting ritual after dreaming of the spirit of a lady-in-waiting that he had killed, the attendant Shou Jizhi (壽寂之) rushed in and assassinated him. With support from the officials and particularly with his brother Liu Xiuren as a major advocate, Liu Yu was declared emperor (as Emperor Ming).

== Early reign: victory over Liu Zixun and loss of northern provinces ==
Emperor Ming posthumously honored his mother Consort Shen as Empress Dowager Xuan but, because he was raised by Emperor Xiaowu's mother Grand Empress Dowager Lu, he continued to honor her as empress dowager. He also tried to pacify the empire by promoting the various officials, his brothers, and some of his nephews. (However, he forced Emperor Qianfei's oldest younger brother Liu Zishang (劉子尚) the Prince of Yuzhang, and his sister Liu Chuyu the Princess Kuaiji, both born also of Empress Wang Xianyuan and both of whom participated in his ill-fated governance, to commit suicide.) He created his wife Princess Wang Zhenfeng empress.

One of the nephews that he tried to promote, Liu Zixun the Prince of Jin'an, whose chief of staff Deng Wan (鄧琬) had just prior to Emperor Qianfei's death declared a rebellion against Emperor Qianfei, refused, and instead declared a rebellion against Emperor Ming, in association with Yuan Yi (袁顗) the governor of Yong Province (雍州, modern northwestern Hubei and southwestern Henan) and Liu Zisui's chief of staff Xun Bianzhi (荀卞之). They accused Emperor Ming of being an usurper and having unduly killed Liu Zishang. Jing Province (荊州, modern central and western Hubei) and Kuaiji Commandery (the southern shore of Hangzhou Bay), governed by Liu Zixun's brothers Liu Zixu (劉子頊) the Prince of Linhai and Liu Zifang (劉子房) the Prince of Xunyang, also quickly rose in support. In spring 466, Deng Wan, claiming to have received a secret edict from Liu Zixun's grandmother Empress Dowager Lu Huinan, declared Liu Zixun emperor. Upon the declaration, nearly the entire empire declared for Liu Zixun, with Emperor Ming only in control of the region immediately around the capital Jiankang.

However, Liu Zixun's generals proceeded slowly, believing that Jiankang would collapse on its own due to the lack of food supply. Emperor Ming's general Wu Xi (吳喜) was quickly able to advance east and capture Liu Zifang, taking the commanderies around Kuaiji that had declared for Liu Zixun and securing a food supply. The troops of Liu Zixun and Emperor Ming stalemated for months in the Chaohu region, until Emperor Ming's general Zhang Xingshi (張興世) built a defense post at Qianxi (錢溪, in modern Chizhou, Anhui), upstream from Liu Zixun's main troops commanded by Yuan Yi and Liu Hu (劉胡), cutting off their food supplies. As Liu Hu then tried to capture Qianxi to reopen food routes, he was defeated by Zhang and Shen Youzhi, and Liu Hu and Yuan then fled, with their troops collapsing. Liu Hu fled back to Xunyang, but then left under guise that he was going to set up perimeter defenses while instead fleeing. Xunyang was left without a defense, and Deng Wan contemplated killing Liu Zixun to save himself, but instead was killed by another staff member Zhang Yue (張悅). Shen then arrived and executed Liu Zixun, ending his rival claim.

However, Emperor Ming then grew arrogant in light of his victory. Instead of his initial policy of pardoning those who had declared for Liu Zixun, he began to deal with those who had not surrendered by this point harshly. In particular, at Liu Xiuren's suggestion, he put to death all of the still living sons of Emperor Xiaowu, accusing them (the oldest of whom was 10) of treason, along with several other officials whom he suspected of covertly supporting Liu Zixun, including Empress Dowager Lu's nephews. (Note: Empress Dowager Lu herself had died during the war under suspicious circumstances. A rumor that the Nan Shi found reliable but indicated was not conclusively proven indicated that she had been secretly pleased about Liu Zixun's rebellion, and had tried to poison Emperor Ming so that Liu Zixun could be successful, but Emperor Ming, realizing her intent, poisoned her instead.) Late in 466, Emperor Ming created his oldest son, Liu Derong, crown prince.

Emperor Ming's reprisals brought an immediate heavy toll for Liu Song. When Xue Andu (薛安都) the governor of Xu Province (徐州, modern northern Jiangsu and northern Anhui), who had earlier declared for Liu Zixun, tried to surrender to him, Emperor Ming, instead of just pardoning Xue, sent a force toward Xue's defense post at Pengcheng, Xue became fearful that Emperor Ming had no intent of pardoning him. (Indeed, Emperor Ming did not, and was intending to lead Xue into resisting, and then wiping him out.) Instead of simply resisting, however, Xue surrendered Xu Province to rival Northern Wei. He was joined in this action by Bi Zhongjing (畢眾敬) the governor of Yan Province (兗州, modern western Shandong), Shen Wenxiu (沈文秀) the governor of Qing Province (青州, modern central and eastern Shandong), and Cui Daogu (崔道固) the governor of Ji Province (冀州, modern northwestern Shandong), although Shen and Cui soon changed their allegiance back to Emperor Ming. Northern Wei forces quickly joined Xue's, and they took up defense position against the attacking forces sent by Emperor Ming, commanded by the generals Zhang Yong (張永) and Shen Youzhi. With Liu Song forces unable to siege Pengcheng effectively, Zhang and Shen Youzhi were forced to withdraw in spring 467, and on their retreat, Northern Wei forces commanded by Yuchi Yuan (尉遲元) sandwiched them with Xue, leading to a major rout. Against Shen Youzhi's protestations, Emperor Ming ordered him to attack Pengcheng again in fall 467, and Yuchi again defeated Shen Youzhi, ending Emperor Ming's efforts at recapturing Xu and Yan Provinces. With Ji and Qing Provinces now completely isolated from the rest of Liu Song, they could not be supplied with fresh troops, and the Northern Wei general Murong Baiyao (慕容白曜) forced Cui's surrender in spring 468 and captured Shen Wenxiu's defense post at Dongyang (東陽, in modern Weifang, Shandong), annexing those provinces for Northern Wei. (Note: While Pengcheng would temporarily be taken by Emperor Wu of Liang, the rest of the territory was lost to the Southern Dynasties forever.)

Emperor Ming also began to be suspicious of his brothers, and in 469, when a plot to make Liu Hui emperor was discovered, Emperor Ming had his brother demoted and then forced him to commit suicide. He also became displeased at the increasing authorities of Liu Xiuren, and Liu Xiuren, realizing that he was being suspected, surrendered part of his authorities but could not regain Emperor Ming's trust.

== Late reign ==
Meanwhile, Emperor Ming's own conduct also began to decay. For example, in 470, he ordered officials and governors to offer him gifts, and when Sun Fengbo (孫奉伯) the governor of Shixing Commandery (始興, roughly modern Shaoguan, Guangdong) only offered guqin and books, and not the treasures that Emperor Ming was hoping for, he sent poison to Sun to order him to commit suicide, although he soon retracted that order. Also on one occasion, he held an imperial feast inside the palace, and ordered his ladies in waiting to strip for the guests. Empress Wang, embarrassed, covered her eyes with a fan. In anger, Emperor Ming said, "Your household is so naïve and unaware of the world. Today everyone is trying to have fun, so why are you covering your eyes?" She responded, "There are many ways to have fun. What kind of a scene is it for aunts and sisters to gather to watch naked ladies in waiting and laugh about it? The fun that our household has is different." He became angrier and chased her away.

Historical accounts, written during the succeeding Southern Qi dynasty, (Note: i.e. the Book of Song by Shen Yue. The History of the Southern Dynasties and Zizhi Tongjian also adopted the same account. In his Zizhi Tongjian Kaoyi, Sima Guang wrote that the edition of Book of Song which he reviewed recorded that instead of being killed, the concubines who bore sons would be imprisoned in secret jails; Tongjian thus adopted the account found in Summary of Song (by Pei Ziye).) indicate that Emperor Ming was impotent, and that although he had 12 sons, those were the results of his having seized his brothers' pregnant concubines and kept the children if they bore males, or his having had his concubines have sexual relations with others. (Note: However, the fact that Empress Wang had two daughters, although no sons, may argue against such allegations, because it appeared rather unlikely that Emperor Ming would do this over female children—indeed, the allegations stated that he would only do this if his brothers' concubines bore males—or that the morally upright Empress Wang would engage in sexual relations with others, thus suggesting that the allegations were made to delegitimize Emperor Ming's sons Emperor Houfei and Emperor Shun vis-à-vis Southern Qi.) In addition, Emperor Ming was said to be suspicious, jealous, cruel, and violent. In addition, he was also superstitious, and his officials and attendants were forced to observe a number of taboos in both language and acts. Whoever violated these taboos would be executed, often in cruel manners, including having their hearts cut open or their entrails pulled out.

In 471, Emperor Ming grew ill, and as Crown Prince Yu was only eight, he was fearful that his brothers would seize the throne, and therefore turned against them. His first target was Liu Xiuyou the Prince of Jinping, who was considered arrogant and violent and often offended Emperor Ming. Emperor Ming therefore, when he was out on a hunt with Liu Xiuyou, found an opportunity to have his guards push Liu Xiuyou off his horse and then pounded to death. When this news reached his youngest brother, Liu Xiuruo (劉休若) the Prince of Baling, the governor of Jing Province, Liu Xiuruo's staff members suggest that he start a rebellion, particularly in light of orders for him to return to Jiankang and then take up Liu Xiuyou's old post at governor of South Xu Province (南徐州, modern western central Jiangsu), but the cautious Liu Xiuruo did not rebel, but instead reported to South Xu. Meanwhile, because the public believed that Liu Xiuren would become regent if Emperor Ming died, the mid-level officials were all trying to ingratiate themselves with Liu Xiuren and his staff, drawing Emperor Ming's anger and suspicion, and he forced Liu Xiuren to commit suicide. He then summoned Liu Xiuruo back to Jiankang and forced him to commit suicide as well. The only brother who was spared with Liu Xiufan (劉休範) the Prince of Guiyang, who was considered to be unvirtuous and incompetent, and therefore not viewed as a threat.

Emperor Ming's suspicions soon turned to other officials as well. In order to test the attitude of Xiao Daocheng the governor of South Yan Province (南兗州, modern eastern central Jiangsu), he had his strategist Wu Xi deliver a pot of wine to Xiao. Xiao, believing that wine was poisoned, was about to flee to Northern Wei, when Wu revealed that the wine was not poisonous and that Emperor Ming was merely trying to test him, and Wu drank some of the wine first to show Xiao. Xiao then drank the wine, and Wu returned to the capital and vouched for Xiao's loyalty, but his leaking of the non-poisonous nature of the wine was soon revealed. Emperor Ming, who was already suspicious of Wu's abilities, forced him to commit suicide. In fear, Empress Wang's brother Wang Jingwen (王景文), the commander of the armed forces, tried to resign. Emperor Ming would not let him do so, and then, suspecting that Wang would take power after Emperor Ming's death, forced Wang to commit suicide in spring 472. Emperor Ming himself died in summer 472, and was succeeded by Crown Prince Yu (as Emperor Houfei).

== Anecdotes ==
During the war with Liu Zixun, Liu Yu's brother Liu Xiuren supposedly became sworn brothers with a local deity named "Marquis Su" in order to seek divine favor. After their victory, Liu Yu wrote a letter to Liu Xiuren, claiming that Marquis Su played a part in their victory. (Note: Liu Xiuren's biography in History of the Southern Dynasties recorded that it was Liu Yu who became sworn brothers with Marquis Su. "Marquis Su" was supposedly a deified Su Jun.)

== Family ==
- Empress Minggong, of the Wang clan of Langya (明恭皇后 琊瑯王氏; 436–479), personal name Zhenfeng (貞風)
  - Princess Jinling (晉陵公主), personal name Bosi (伯姒)
  - Princess Jian'an (建安公主), personal name Boyuan (伯媛)
- Guifei, of the Chen clan (貴妃 陳氏), personal name Miaodeng (妙登)
  - Liu Yu, Prince of Cangwu (蒼梧王 劉昱; 463–477), first son
- Zhaohua, of the Chen clan (昭華 陳氏), personal name Farong (法容)
  - Liu Zhun, Emperor Shun (順皇帝 劉準; 467–479), third son
- Xiuhua, of the Du clan (修華 杜氏)
  - Liu Hui, Prince of Suiyang (隨陽王 劉翽; 471–479), tenth son
- Xiuyi, of the Xie clan (修儀 謝氏)
  - Liu Faliang, Prince of Dezhi (德治王 劉法良), second son
  - Liu Xie, Prince of Jinxi (晉熙王 劉燮; 470–479), sixth son
- Xiurong, of the Zheng clan (修容 鄭氏; d. 474)
  - Liu Zhijing, Prince of Dongping (東平王 劉智井; d. 470), fifth son
- Jieyu, of the Xu clan (婕妤 徐氏)
  - Fourth son
  - Liu Ji, Prince of Jiangxia (江夏王 劉躋; 470–479), eighth son
- Meiren, of the Quan clan (美人 泉氏)
  - Liu You, Prince Shang of Shaoling (邵陵殤王 劉友; 470–479), seventh son
  - Liu Xi, Prince of Shijian (始建王 劉禧; 471–479), 12th son
- Liangren, of the Xu clan (良人 徐氏)
  - Liu Zan, Prince of Wuling (武陵王 劉贊; 470–479), ninth son
  - Liu Song, Prince of Xinxing (新興王 劉嵩; 471–479), 11th son
- Unknown
  - Princess Yangxian (陽羨公主)
    - Married Wang Jian of Langya (琊瑯; 452–489) in 469

== Notes ==
Regnal titles
Preceded by Emperor Qianfei of Liu Song	Emperor of Liu Song (Jiankang region); 465–472	Succeeded by Emperor Houfei of Liu Song
Preceded by Liu Zixun	Emperor of Liu Song (Most regions); 466–472	Succeeded by Emperor Houfei of Liu Song
Preceded by Liu Zixun	Emperor of China (Northern Jiangsu); 466	Succeeded by Emperor Xianwen of Northern Wei
Preceded by Liu Zixun	Emperor of China (Shandong); 466–469	Succeeded by Emperor Xianwen of Northern Wei
