= Emperor Gao of Southern Qi =

Emperor of Southern Qi from 479 to 482

Emperor Gao of Southern Qi 南齊高帝
- Portrait of Emperor Gao from Sancai Tuhui

Emperor of Southern Qi
- Reign: May 29, 479 – April 11, 482
- Successor: Emperor Wu
- Born: Xiao Doujiang (蕭鬥將); 427
- Died: April 11, 482
- Burial: Tai'an Mausoleum (泰安陵, in present-day Danyang, Jiangsu)
- Consorts: Empress Gaozhao
Full name
- Family name: Xiāo (蕭); Given name: Dàochéng (道成)
Era name and dates
- Jiànyuán (建元): 479-482
Posthumous name
- Emperor Gao (高皇帝)
Temple name
- Tàizǔ (太祖)
- House: Lanling Xiao
- Dynasty: Southern Qi
- Father: Xiao Chengzhi
- Mother: Chen Daozheng

Emperor Gao of Southern Qi ((南)齊高帝; 427– 11 April 482), personal name Xiao Daocheng (蕭道成), courtesy name Shaobo (紹伯), childhood name Doujiang (鬥將), was the founding emperor of the Southern Qi dynasty of China. He served as a general under the preceding dynasty Liu Song's Emperor Ming and Emperor Houfei. In 477, fearful that the young, cruel Emperor Houfei would kill him, he assassinated Emperor Houfei and seized power, eventually taking the throne in 479 to start Southern Qi.

== Background ==
Xiao Daocheng was born in 427. His ancestors traced their line to the famed Western Han dynasty chancellor Xiao He. If their records were accurate, Xiao Daocheng was Xiao He's 24-generation descendant. During the Jin and Liu Song dynasties, Xiao's ancestors served as low-level officials. His father Xiao Chengzhi (蕭承之) was a distant cousin of Xiao Wenshou, and served as a general under Emperor Wen of Song, for Xiao Chengzhi's contributions in campaigns against rival Northern Wei, Xiao Chengzhi was created the Baron of Jinxing. Xiao Daocheng was a third cousin once removed of Xiao Yan, the founder of the Liang dynasty.

Xiao Daocheng first studied the Confucian classics at the imperial university set up by Emperor Wen and headed by the hermit and scholar Lei Cizong (zh:雷次宗) when he was 12, but by age 15 he was serving in the military. He continued serving as a military officer during the reigns of Emperors Wen and Xiaowu (Emperor Wen's son).

== Under Emperor Ming of Liu Song ==
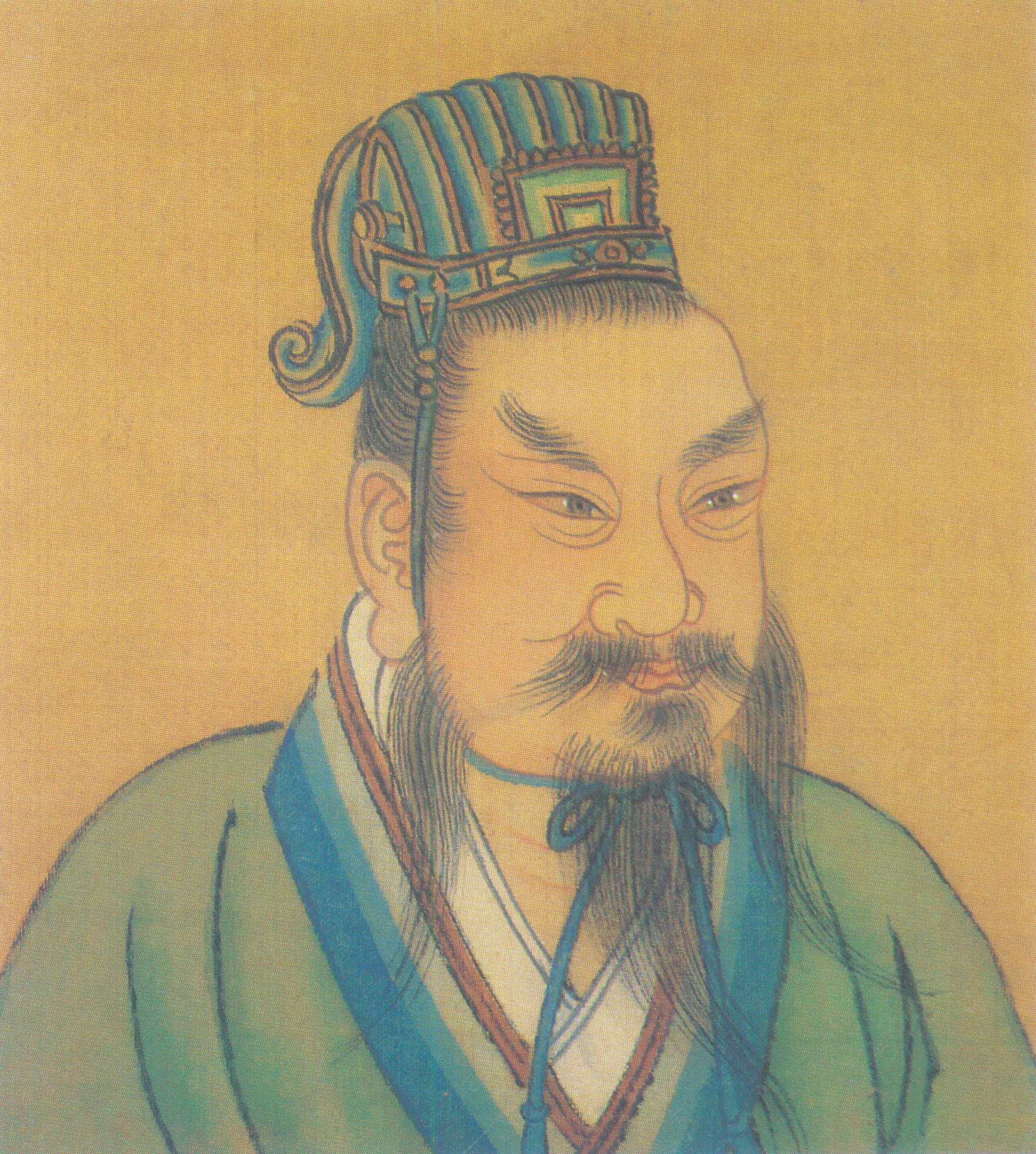
Portrait of Emperor Gao painted in the Qing dynasty

By the time that Emperor Xiaowu's brother Emperor Ming and Emperor Xiaowu's son Liu Zixun were fighting for the throne in 466 after the brief reign and assassination of Emperor Xiaowu's son Emperor Qianfei, Xiao Daocheng was a general, and his allegiance was with Emperor Ming. He participated in the campaign against the army nominally commanded by Liu Zixun's brother Liu Zifang (劉子房) the Prince of Xunyang and governor of Kuaiji Commandery along the southern shore of Hangzhou Bay. He subsequently defeated the army sent south by Xue Andu (薛安都) the governor of Xu Province (徐州, modern northern Jiangsu and northern Anhui). For these contributions, Emperor Ming created him the Marquess of Xiyang and made him the acting governor of South Xu Province (南徐州, modern western central Jiangsu). Later, he became the governor of Southern Yan Province (南兗州, modern eastern central Jiangsu), defending the important city of Huaiyin (淮陰, in modern Huaian, Jiangsu). It was said that, while at this post, he began to engage a group of talented followers.

During Emperor Ming's reign, there were rumors that Xiao Daocheng's facial features were unusual and were signs that he would become emperor. By 471, Emperor Ming – who had already carried out a campaign of killing most of his brothers and some high-level officials in fear that they would not be loyal to his son Liu Yu the Crown Prince after his death – became suspicious of Xiao, particularly because there were rumors that Xiao was secretly communicating with Northern Wei. Emperor Ming sent his general Wu Xi (吳喜), a friend of Xiao's, with a sealed pot of wine to Huaiyin to deliver to Xiao. Xiao became fearful that the wine was poisoned and was preparing to flee to Northern Wei. Wu secretly told Xiao that the wine was not poisoned and drank some himself, before Xiao would dare to drink.

Once Wu returned to the capital Jiankang, he assured Emperor Ming that Xiao was loyal. But after details of Wu's leaking the information to Xiao became known to Emperor Ming, Emperor Ming forced Wu to commit suicide; he did not take any actions against Xiao. Soon thereafter he recalled Xiao to Jiankang. Xiao's followers largely suspected that Emperor Ming would kill him and suggested that he resist, but Xiao believed that Emperor Ming would not do so. He therefore returned to Jiankang, where he became a commanding general of Crown Prince Yu's guards. (In secret, Xiao told his followers that he believed that Liu Song would not last much longer and that he would need their support when opportunity presented itself.) When Emperor Ming grew gravely ill in 472, on the recommendation of the high-level official Chu Yuan (to whom, along with Yuan Can, Emperor Ming entrusted the care of Crown Prince Yu), who was a friend of Xiao, Xiao became a commanding general of the capital defense force. Emperor Ming soon died, and Crown Prince Yu took the throne as Emperor Houfei.

== Under Emperor Houfei of Liu Song ==
In 474, Emperor Houfei's uncle Liu Xiufan (劉休範) the Prince of Guiyang and governor of Jiang Province (江州, modern Jiangxi and Fujian), angry that he had not been made the regent, rebelled and made a quick advancement toward Jiankang. At a major military strategy session, although there were a number of high-level officials, powerful associates of the emperor, and senior generals present, no one dared to speak first. Then Xiao Daocheng proposed the strategy of not sending an army to engage Liu Xiufan but rather defend the strong defensive posts in the outskirts of Jiankang and not actively engage Liu Xiufan, forcing him into a stalemate and causing him to run out of food supplies. Without significant opposition, Xiao's plan was adopted.

Liu Xiufan's forces soon arrived. He made a direct assault against Xiao's defensive position. With Xiao's approval, his officers Huang Hui (黃回) and Zhang Jing'er (張敬兒) falsely surrendered to Liu Xiufan and then further informed Liu Xiufan that Xiao wished to surrender as well. While pretending to secretly convey the information, Zhang and Huang then assassinated Liu Xiufan. However, because they had to then discard Liu Xiufan's head to avoid Liu Xiufan's guards, the news was not known initially. Liu Xiufan's forces intensified their siege against the various defense positions. Xiao was barely able to hold his position, but Liu Xiufan's general Ding Wenhao (丁文豪) was able to defeat and kill Liu Mian (劉勔) and Wang Daolong (王道隆) and put the palace under siege. Soon, news of Liu Xiufan's death became gradually known, and Ding's forces collapsed.

In the aftermaths of Liu Xiufan's defeat, Xiao was promoted. He, with Yuan Can, Chu Yuan, and Emperor Houfan's distant uncle Liu Bing, were in charge of the affairs of government and known as the "four nobles" (四貴). In 476, when Emperor Houfei's cousin Liu Jingsu (劉景素) the governor of South Xu Province, who received wrong information that Jiankang had fallen into a state of confusion, started a rebellion, Xiao coordinated the campaign against Liu Jingsu (although he did not personally command troops), and Liu Jingsu was defeated and killed.

In 477, Emperor Houfei, by now age 14, was growing increasingly impulsive and violent, often wandering outside the palace with his guards and killing all people or animals they encountered. One day, he suddenly charged into Xiao's headquarters and saw Xiao sleeping naked. He was intrigued by the large size of Xiao's belly. He woke Xiao up, drew a target on Xiao's belly, and prepared to shoot him with arrows. Xiao pleaded for his life, and Emperor Houfei's attendant Wang Tian'en (王天恩) pointed out that if he killed Xiao with an arrow, he would lose Xiao's belly as a wonderful target. So, at Wang's suggestion, Emperor Houfei shot Xiao with bone-made round-point arrows and was pleased when he was able to target Xiao's bellybutton successfully. Xiao became fearful after the incident; he initially discussed with Yuan and Chu the possibilities of deposing the emperor but could not get them to go along with his plan. Xiao therefore acted on his own, associating with Emperor Houfei's attendants and eventually getting one of them, Yang Yufu (楊玉夫), to kill Emperor Houfei while Emperor Houfei was asleep. Xiao then forced Yuan and Liu Bing to effectively grant him near-imperial powers, leading to concerns that Xiao would next take the throne.

== Under Emperor Shun of Liu Song ==
Xiao Daocheng made Emperor Houfei's brother Liu Zhun the Prince of Ancheng emperor (as Emperor Shun). In response, the general Shen Youzhi arose with the troops of his Jing Province (荊州, modern central and western Hubei), accusing Xiao of wanting to usurp the throne. Yuan Can and Liu Bing also believed that that was Xiao's intent. As Xiao prepared for a campaign against Shen, they secretly planned another uprising within Jiankang to overthrow Xiao. Yuan, believing that the plot would not succeed without Chu Yuan's support, told Chu of the plot as well. Chu, who was friendly with Xiao, quickly informed Xiao. Yuan, not aware of this, continued his preparations, aligning with a number of generals and preparing to rise. However, Liu Bing panicked during the preparation stage and fled to Yuan's defense post at the fortress of Shitou Cheng several hours before the scheduled time, alarming Xiao and allowing him to further start a counterinsurrection, arresting and killing several generals aligned with Yuan and Liu Bing before they could act. Xiao's troops then besieged Yuan's defenses at Shitou, killing Yuan and Liu Bing.

Meanwhile, the provincial governors whom Shen invited to join him all declined and either resisted him or stood by. Shen nevertheless had a strong army, and the imperial army generals were apprehensive about facing him. He initially progressed quickly toward Jiankang. But as he went past Yingcheng (郢城, in modern Wuhan, Hubei), he was provoked by insults of Liu Shilong (柳世隆), the chief of staff for Liu Zan (劉贊) the Prince of Wuling and governor of Ying Province into stopping and putting the well-fortified Yingcheng under siege.

In 478, with his forces unable to capture Yingcheng, Shen Youzhi's soldiers began to desert. Shen aggravated the situation by imposing severe punishments on the commanding officers of deserting soldiers — which caused them to desert. Shen's officer Liu Rangbing (劉攘兵) surrendered to Liu Shilong, causing his forces to collapse. Shen tried to retreat to Jiangling (the capital of Jing Province). By the time he did so, Zhang Jing'er, whom Xiao had made the governor of Yong Province (雍州, modern southwestern Henan and southwestern Hubei) with the intent of having him attack Shen from the rear, had already captured Jiangling and killed Shen Yuanyan, whom Shen Youzhi had left in charge of Jiangling. Shen's remaining army, seeing that Jiangling had fallen, collapsed, and he initially tried to flee, but realizing that his escape route had been cut off he committed suicide. Xiao was now without substantial opposition, particularly after he killed Huang Hui, who had been implicated in conspiracies with Liu Jingsu and Yuan Can, later that year after Huang showed signs of insubordination. He began to put his sons into important posts as well. He also engaged the nobly born official Wang Jian as a key assistant and, with Chu's tacit agreement, started making moves toward the throne, including quietly assassinating Emperor Houfei's brothers. In 479, over a brief two months, he had Emperor Shun create him the Duke of Qi, and then the Prince of Qi, and bestow upon him the nine bestowments, all progressive steps toward the throne. In summer 479, he forced the fearful Emperor Shun into yielding the throne to him, ending Liu Song and starting Southern Qi, as its Emperor Gao.

== Reign ==
A major trend that Emperor Gao tried to start after he took the throne was a move against wastefulness and luxury and a move toward frugality. He appeared to be fairly frugal, although the effects his edicts on those subjects had on his officials and nobles are unclear.

Later in 479, when someone was riding a horse near the mansion of the former Emperor Shun (now the Prince of Ruyin), the guards whom Emperor Gao posted to watch over the former emperor panicked, believing someone was about to start a rebellion. They killed the former emperor. Emperor Gao did not punish these guards, but rewarded them and further carried out a massacre of Liu Song's imperial clan. Later that year, he made princes of his son Xiao Ze (who had by that point been known as an able general, now crown prince), his other sons, as well as Xiao Ze's oldest son Xiao Zhangmao.

Meanwhile, Emperor Gao received reports that Northern Wei was about to make an attack and claim to be trying to reestablish Liu Song on the behalf of Liu Chang (劉昶) the Prince of Danyang, a son of Liu Song's Emperor Wen who had in 465 fled to Northern Wei over fears that Emperor Qianfei would kill him. Emperor Gao prepared the northern borders in anticipation of a major attack, which Northern Wei launched in winter 479. The Northern Wei attack ended, however, after Northern Wei forces made a failed siege of Shouyang. Realizing that Jiankang was relatively defenseless (as throughout Jin and Liu Song, a wall had never been built around Jiankang), he started a construction project to build a wall around Jiankang. Northern Wei and Southern Qi forces would continue to have minor border battles for another year, until spring 481, but there would be no further major campaigns by either side.

In spring 482, Emperor Gao died. Crown Prince Ze succeeded him as Emperor Wu.

== Family ==
- Empress Gaozhao, of the Liu clan of Guangling (高昭皇后 廣陵劉氏; 423–472), personal name Zhirong (智容)
  - Xiao Ze, Emperor Wu (武皇帝 蕭賾; 440–493), first son
  - Xiao Ni, Prince Wenxian of Yuzhang (豫章文獻王 蕭嶷; 444–492), second son
- Guipin, of the Xie clan (貴嬪 謝氏)
  - Xiao Ying, Prince Xian of Linchuan (臨川獻王 蕭映; 459–490), third son
  - Xiao Huang, Prince Wei of Changsha (長沙威王 蕭晃; 460–490), fourth son
- Guiren, of the Qu clan (貴人 區氏)
  - Xiao Jun, Prince of Hengyang (衡陽王 蕭鈞; 473–494), 11th son
- Xiuyi, of the Lu clan (修儀 陸氏)
  - Xiao Qiang, Prince of Poyang (鄱陽王 蕭鏘; 468–494), seventh son
  - Xiao Qiu, Prince of Jinxi (晉熙王 蕭𨱇; 479–494), 18th son
- Xiurong, of the Yuan clan (修容 袁氏)
  - Xiao Shuo, Prince of Guiyang (桂陽王 蕭鑠; 470–494), eighth son
- Shufei, of the Zhang clan (淑妃 張氏)
  - Xiao Feng, Prince of Jiangxia (江夏王 蕭鋒; 475–494), 12th son
  - Xiao Xuan, Prince of Hedong (河東王 蕭鉉; 480–498), 19th son
- Meiren, of the Liu clan (美人 李氏)
  - Xiao Rui, Prince of Nanping (南平王 蕭銳; 476–494), 15th son
- Lady, of the Luo clan (羅氏)
  - Xiao Ye, Prince Zhao of Wuling (武陵昭王 蕭曄; 467–494), fifth son
- Lady, of the Ren clan (任氏)
  - Xiao Hao, Prince Gong of Ancheng (安成恭王 蕭皓; 468–491), sixth son
- Lady, of the He clan (何氏)
  - Xiao Jian, Prince Jian of Shixing (始興簡王 蕭鑑; 471–491), tenth son
  - Xiao Keng, Prince of Yidu (宜都王 蕭鏗; 477–494), 16th son
- Unknown
  - Princess Xian Yixing (義興憲公主), first daughter
    - Married Shen Wenhe (沈文和)
  - Princess Huainan (淮南公主), second daughter
    - Married Wang Jian (王暕)
  - Princess Linhai (臨海公主), third daughter
    - Married Wang Bin (王彬)

== Genealogy ==
- Xiao Zheng (萧整)
  - Xiao Juan (萧隽)
    - Xiao Lezi (萧乐子)
      - Xiao Chengzhi (萧承之)
        - Xiao Daocheng
  - Xiao Xia (萧辖)
    - Xiao Fuzi (萧副子)
      - Xiao Daoci (萧道赐)
        - Xiao Shunzhi (萧顺之)
          - Xiao Yan

Chinese royalty
New dynasty	Emperor of Southern Qi; 479–482	Succeeded by Emperor Wu of Southern Qi
Preceded by Emperor Shun of Liu Song	Emperor of China (Southern); 479–482	Succeeded by Emperor Wu of Southern Qi
