= List of emperors of the Southern dynasties =

The Southern dynasties (Chinese: 南朝; pinyin: náncháo) describe a succession of Chinese empires that coexisted alongside a series of Northern dynasties. The era is generally described as the Northern and Southern dynasties, lasting from 420–589 AD after the Jin and before the Sui dynasty.

The Southern dynasties were as follows:

- Liu Song (420–479 AD)
- Southern Qi (479–502 AD)
- Liang dynasty (502–557 AD)
- Chen dynasty (557–589 AD)

The Western Liang (555–587 AD) was a rump successor to the Liang dynasty and is typically not regarded as a legitimate regime that bore the Mandate of Heaven.

== Emperors of the Southern dynasties ==
Posthumous names (Shi Hao 諡號)	Birth names	Periods of reign	Era names (Nian Hao 年號) and their according range of years
Liu Song dynasty (420–479)
Convention: Song + posthumous name, sometimes except Liu Yu who was referred using personal name.
Wu Di (武帝 wu3 di4)	Liu Yu (劉裕 liu3 yu4)	420–422	Yongchu (永初 yong3 chu1) 420–422
Shao Di (少帝 shao4 di4)	Liu Yi Fu (劉義符 liu3 yi4 fu2)	423–424	Jingping (景平 jing3 ping2) 423–424
Wen Di (文帝 wen2 di4)	Liu Yi Long (劉義隆 liu3 yi4 long2)	424–453	Yuanjia (元嘉 yaun2 jia1) 424–453
Xiao Wu Di (孝武帝 xiao1 wu3 di4)	Liu Jun (劉駿 liu3 jun4)	454–464	Xiaojian (元嘉 xiao1 jian4) 454–456; Daming (大明 da4 ming2) 457–464
Qian Fei Di (前廢帝 qian2 fei4 di4)	Liu Zi Ye (劉子業 liu3 zi5 ye4)	465	Yongguang (永光 yong3 guang1) 465; Jinghe (景和 jing3 he2) 465
Ming Di (明帝 ming2 di4)	Liu Yu (劉彧 liu3 yu4)	465–472	Taishi (泰始 tai4 shi3) 465–471; Taiyu (泰豫 tai4 yu4) 472
Hou Fei Di (後廢帝 hou4 fei4 di4 or Cang Wu Wang (蒼梧王 cang1 wu2 wang2)	Liu Yu (劉昱 liu3 yu4)	473–477	Yuanhui (元徽 yuan2 hui1) 473–477
Shun Di (順帝 shun4 di4)	Liu Zhun (劉準 liu3 zhun3)	477–479	Shengming (昇明 sheng1 ming2) 477–479
Southern Qi dynasty 479–502
Convention: Qi + posthumous name
Gao Di (高帝 gao1 di4)	Xiao Dao Cheng (蕭道成 xiao1 dao4 cheng2)	479–482	Jianyuan (建元 jian4 yuan2) 479–482
Wu Di (武帝 wu3 jing4 di4)	Xiao Ze (蕭賾 xiao1 ze2)	483–493	Yongming (永明 yong3 ming2) 483–493
Yu Lin Wang (鬱林王 yu4 lin2 wang2)	Xiao Zhaoye (蕭昭業 xiao1 zhao1 ye4)	494	Longchang (隆昌 long2 chang1) 494
Hai Ling Wang (海陵王 hai3 ling2 wang2)	Xiao Zhaowen (蕭昭文 xiao1 zhao1 wen2)	494	Yanxing (延興 yan2 xing1) 494
Ming Di (明帝 ming2 di4)	Xiao Luan (蕭鸞 xiao1 luan2)	494–498	Jianwu (建武 jian4 wu3) 494–498; Yongtai (永泰 yong3 tai4) 498
Dong Hun Hou (東昏侯 dong1 hun1 hou2)	Xiao Baojuan (蕭寶卷 xiao1 bao3 juan3)	499–501	Yongyuan (永元 yong3 yuan2) 499–501
He Di (和帝 he2 di4)	Xiao Bao Rong (蕭寶融 xiao1 bao3 rong2)	501–502	Zhongxing (中興 zhong1 xing1) 501–502
Liang dynasty 502–557
Convention: Liang + posthumous name
Wu Di (武帝 wu3 jing4 di4)	Xiao Yan (蕭衍 xiao1 yan3)	502–549	Tianjian (天監 tian1 jian1) 502–519; Putong (普通 pu3 tong1) 520–527; Datong (大通 da4 tong1) 527–529; Zhongdatong (中大通 zhong1 da4 tong1) 529–534; Datong (大同 da4 tong2) 535–546; Zhongdatong (中大同 zhong1 da4 tong2) 546–547; Taiqing (太清 tai4 qing1) 547–549
Jian Wen Di (簡文帝 jian3 wen2 di4)	Xiao Gang (蕭綱 xiao1 gang1)	549–551	Dabao (大寶 da4 bao3) 550–551
Yu Zhang Wang (豫章王 yu4 zhang1 wang2)	Xiao Dong (蕭棟 xiao1 dong4)	551–552	Tianzheng (天正 tian1 zheng4) 551–552
Yuan Di (元帝 yuan2 di4)	Xiao Yi (蕭繹 xiao1 yi4)	552–555	Chengsheng (承聖 cheng2 sheng4) 552–555
Zhen Yang Hou (貞陽侯 zhen1 yang2 hou2)	Xiao Yuan Ming (蕭淵明 xiao1 yuan1 ming2)	555	Tiancheng (天成 tian1 cheng2) 555
Jing Di (敬帝 jing4 di4)	Xiao Fang Zhi (蕭方智 xiao1 fang1 zhi4)	555–557	Shaotai (紹泰 shao4 tai4) 555–556; Taiping (太平 tai4 ping2) 556–557
Chen dynasty 557–589
Convention: Chen + posthumous name
Wu Di (武帝 wu3 di4)	Chen Ba Xian (陳霸先 chen2 ba4 xian1)	557–559	Yongding (永定 yong3 ding4) 557–559
Wen Di (文帝 wen2 di4)	Chen Qian (陳蒨 chen2 qian4)	560–566	Tianjia (天嘉 tian1 jia1) 560–566; Tiankang (天康 tian1 kang1) 566
Fei Di (廢帝 fei4 di4)	Chen Bo Zong (陳伯宗 chen2 bo2 zong1)	567–568	Guangda (光大 guang1 da4) 567–568
Xuan Di (宣帝 xuan1 di4)	Chen Xu (陳頊 chen2 xu1)	569–582	Taijian (太建 tai4 jian4) 569–582
Hou Zhu (後主 hou4 zhu3)	Chen Shu Bao (陳叔寶 chen2 shu2 bao3)	583–589	Zhide (至德 zhi4 de2) 583–586; Zhenming (禎明 zhen1 ming2) 587–589

== Emperors of the Western Liang dynasty (555–587 AD) ==
The Western Liang is also sometimes called the "Later Liang" (not to be confused with the Later Liang of the Five Dynasties and Ten Kingdoms period).

Temple names (Miao Hao 廟號 miào hào)	Posthumous names (Shi Hao 諡號)	Personal names	Periods of reign	Era names (Nián Hào 年號) and their relevant range of years
Convention: Xi Liang + posthumous name
Note: some historians set Western Liang as a continuation of the Liang dynasty since it was founded by descendants of the Xiao's, the ruling family of the Liang dynasty.
Zhong Zong (中宗 zhong1 zong1)	Xuan Di (宣帝 xuan1 di4)	Xiao Cha (蕭察 xiao1 cha2)	555–562	Dading (大定 da4 ding4) 555–562
Shi Zong (世宗 shi4 zong1)	Xiao Ming Di (孝明帝 xiao4 ming2 di4)	Xiao Kui (蕭巋 xiao1 kui1)	562–585	Tianbao (天保 tian1 bao3) 562–585
Did not exist	Xiao Jing Di (孝靜帝 xiao4 jing4 di4) or Ju Gong (莒公 ju3 gong1)	Xiao Cong (蕭琮 xiao1 cong2)	585–587	Guangyun (廣運 guang3 yun4) 562–585

== See also ==
- List of emperors of the Northern dynasties
- Northern and Southern dynasties
- Chinese sovereign
