= Xiao Baoyin =

Chinese Southern Qi prince and Northern Wei general (486-530)

Xiao Baoyin (Chinese: 蕭寶寅) (486/7 – 10 June 530), courtesy name Zhiliang (智亮), was an imperial prince of the Chinese Southern Qi dynasty. In 502, as Southern Qi was on the edge of being taken over by the general Xiao Yan, who was preparing by killing the imperial princes, Xiao Baoyin fled to the rival Northern Wei dynasty and became an official and general in the Northern Wei government. In 527, as Northern Wei was embroiled in agrarian rebellions, Xiao Baoyin rebelled and tried to reestablish Southern Qi, but was soon defeated and forced to flee to a rebel leader, Moqi Chounu, and he served under Moqi until both were captured in 530 by the paramount general Erzhu Rong's nephew Erzhu Tianguang. He was forced to commit suicide.

== Early life ==
Xiao Baoyin was born in 486, during the reign of Emperor Wu of Southern Qi, to whom his father Xiao Luan was a cousin. He was Xiao Luan's sixth son, and his mother was Xiao Luan's wife Liu Huiduan (劉惠端). She also bore two older brothers of his, Xiao Baojuan, Xiao Baoxuan (蕭寶玄), and a younger brother, Xiao Baorong, but died in 489, when Xiao Baoyin was just two. During Emperor Wu's reign, Xiao Luan carried the title of Marquess of Xichang and was a high-level official. After Emperor Wu's death in 493, Xiao Luan served as prime minister to Emperor Wu's grandson and successor Xiao Zhaoye, but in 494 killed the frivolous Xiao Zhaoye, briefly replacing Xiao Zhaoye with Xiao Zhaoye's brother Xiao Zhaowen before seizing the throne himself (as Emperor Ming). He created his sons imperial princes, and Xiao Baoyin carried the title of Prince of Jian'an.

== During Xiao Baojuan's and Emperor He's reigns ==
Emperor Ming died in 498, and was succeeded by Xiao Baoyin's older brother Xiao Baojuan. Xiao Baojuan was a violent ruler, but treated his brothers generally well, and Xiao Baoyin was given important official titles. In 500, after Xiao Yan rebelled against Xiao Baojuan after Xiao Baojuan had killed Xiao Yan's brother, the general Xiao Yi (蕭懿), Xiao Yan and another rebel general, Xiao Yingzhou (蕭穎冑), declared Xiao Baoyin's younger brother Xiao Baorong emperor (as Emperor He) at Jiangling, plunging Southern Qi into civil war. In 501, the general Zhang Xintai (張欣泰) tried to rebel against Xiao Baojuan at the capital Jiankang, and he seized Xiao Baoyin, preparing to declare him emperor. However, Zhang was soon defeated, and Xiao Baojuan, believing Xiao Baoyin to be not involved in the plot, did not punish him. Xiao Yan, however, won victory after victory, and soon put Jiankang under siege.

Around the new year 502, during Xiao Yan's siege of Jiankang, Xiao Baojuan's generals Wang Zhenguo (王珍國) and Zhang Ji (張稷), fearful that Xiao Baojuan would hold them responsible for not being able to lift the siege, assassinated him and offered the city to Xiao Yan. Xiao Yan entered the city and assumed regent powers (although he made Xiao Zhaoye's mother Empress Dowager Wang Baoming titular regent), and as Xiao Yan had Empress Dowager Wang bestow on him the title of Duke of Jian'an, Xiao Baoyin's title was changed to Prince of Poyang.

Xiao Yan had his eyes on the throne, and while ostensibly preparing the capital to welcome Emperor He back as the emperor, was preparing to force Emperor He to yield the throne to him. As part of his preparation, he began to execute Emperor He's brothers. Xiao Baoyin's eunuch Yan Wenzhi (顏文智) and attendant Ma Gong (麻拱) therefore plotted to try to save the 15-year-old prince's life. They prepared for a boat on the Yangtze River, and then dug a hole on the wall during the middle of the night, to allow Xiao Baoyin to escape despite guards that Xiao Yan had put around his mansion. After hiding and traveling, Xiao Baoyin eventually reached the border city of Shouyang (壽陽, in modern Lu'an, Anhui), which Northern Wei had captured from Southern Qi in 500. Emperor Xuanwu of Northern Wei welcomed Xiao Baoyin as an honored guest, and after Xiao Yan seized the throne from Emperor He later in 502 (establishing the Liang dynasty as its Emperor Wu), considered using Xiao Baoyin as a tool to conquer Liang. Publicly, Liang declared that Xiao Baoyin had been caught plotting treason and had been executed.

== Service as Northern Wei official and general ==
Emperor Xuanwu favored Xiao Baoyin for his brotherly piety in mourning Xiao Baojuan, and in spring 503, after Xiao Baoyin had prostrated himself for several days before Emperor Xuanwu's palace to beg for an attack against Liang, Emperor Xuanwu started plans of attacking Liang. As part of the plan, Xiao Baoyin was given an army and given the dual titles of Duke of Danyang and Prince of Qi, with an eye toward having him conquer Liang and reestablish Southern Qi as Northern Wei's vassal. For this reason, Emperor Xuanwu permitted Xiao Baoyin to gather strategists and generals about himself, which was usually not permitted for imperial subjects. He also gave his sister the Princess Nanyang to Xiao Baoyin in marriage.

Xiao Baoyin appeared to be a capable general, and during the reigns of Emperor Xuanwu and Emperor Xuanwu's son Emperor Xiaoming, he rotated through a number of key governmental offices, and while he was temporarily stripped of his titles in 507 after he and another major general, Yuan Ying (元英) the Prince of Zhongshan, suffered a major defeat at the hands of the Liang general Wei Rui (韋叡), his titles were soon restored. As Northern Wei's attacks on Liang repeatedly fizzled, however, there appeared to be little chance for him to reestablish Southern Qi. In 511, when Northern Wei forces suffered another crushing defeat, he was described to be the only general who was able to keep his army undamaged. In 516, he participated in the prevention of a Liang attack on Shouyang. While on that campaign, Liang's Emperor Wu wrote him a personal letter, promising that if he defected from Northern Wei, he would be given the border provinces as well as his surviving relatives. Xiao Baoyin refused and turned the letter over to Emperor Xiaoming's administration.

In 522, when Xiao Yan's nephew Xiao Zhengde, who had previously been adopted by Xiao Yan before he had any sons, fled to Northern Wei, claiming to be Liang's deposed crown prince, Xiao Baoyin wrote a severe denunciation of Xiao Zhengde, pointing out that Xiao Zhengde was fleeing from his uncle the emperor and father Xiao Hong (蕭宏), the Prince of Linchuan and a high-level official in the Liang administration, and asking that Xiao Zhengde be executed. As a result of Xiao Baoyin's denunciation, while Northern Wei did not execute Xiao Zhengde, it treated him with no preferential treatment, and Xiao Zhengde eventually fled back to Liang.

By 524, Northern Wei was stricken with agrarian rebellions throughout its borders. In fall 524, Xiao Baoyin was commissioned to attack one of the major rebels, Mozhe Niansheng (莫折念生), who had taken much of modern western Shaanxi and eastern Gansu and claimed the title of Emperor of Qin. In 525, Xiao Baoyin had a major victory over Mozhe Niansheng's brother Mozhe Tiansheng, substantially reducing Mozhe Niansheng's power, but he soon became stalemated against Mozhe Niansheng and was unable to have a conclusive victory. Several months later, Xiao Baoyin in turn suffered a major defeat at the hands of Moqi Chounu, and his lieutenant Cui Yanbo (崔延伯), who was instrumental in the victory over Mozhe Tiansheng, was killed. Xiao Baoyin was not sure whether to retreat or to continue fighting, but began to worry that Emperor Xiaoming's mother and regent Empress Dowager Hu would punish him. Empress Dowager Hu did indeed demote him, but kept him in command of the army. His titles were restored after his officer Yang Kan killed Mozhe Niansheng in battle in 527.

== Rebellion and death ==
However, Xiao Baoyin continued to consider rebellion, using the excuse that one of Empress Dowager Hu's most trusted officials was Yuan Lüe (元略) the Prince of Yiyang, who had been previously treated well by Liang when he fled there, and must have been instructed by Liang's Emperor Wu to kill him under false pretenses. When Empress Dowager Hu sent the strong-willed official Li Daoyuan to examine Xiao Baoyin's troops, Xiao Baoyin assassinated Li and then, in winter 527, declared himself the Emperor of Qi. However, his rebellion was not much supported even by his own subordinates, who rose against him. In 528, his general Hou Zhongde (侯終德) ambushed him, and with his troops collapsing, Xiao Baoyin fled, with his wife the Princess Nanyang and youngest son Xiao Kai (蕭凱) to Moqi Chounu. Moqi Chounu, who soon declared himself emperor, gave Xiao Baoyin the title Taifu (太傅, "imperial professor") and made him a major general.

In 530, the paramount general Erzhu Rong (who had in 527 overthrown Empress Dowager Hu after she killed Emperor Xiaoming and placed Emperor Xiaozhuang on the throne) sent his nephew Erzhu Tianguang to quell the rebellions in the western provinces. Erzhu Tianguang quickly scored a number of victories, and after first tricking Moqi into complacency, made a surprise attack on him and captured him. Erzhu Tianguang then approached Moqi's capital Gaoping (高平, in modern Guyuan, Ningxia), and the forces in Gaoping seized Xiao Baoyin and surrendered.

Xiao Baoyin and Moqi Chounu were taken to the capital Luoyang and displayed for three days like circus animals. Xiao Baoyin's putative nephew Xiao Zan (蕭贊) (Note: the son of Consort Wu, who was Xiao Baojuan's concubine and later Xiao Yan's, who believed that he was Xiao Baojuan's son and not Xiao Yan's) the Prince of Danyang pleaded for his life, as did the officials Li Shenjun (李神儁) and Gao Daomu (高道穆), who were friendly with Xiao Baoyin, reasoning to Emperor Xiaozhuang that Xiao Baoyin's rebellion was during Empress Dowager Hu's corrupt regime. However, the official Wang Daoxi (王道習) argued against sparing Xiao Baoyin, reasoning that while Xiao Baoyin's rebellion was during the prior administration, he served under Moqi Chounu during the current administration. Emperor Xiaozhuang agreed, and beheaded Moqi and forced Xiao Baoyin to commit suicide. As he was about to take poison, the Princess Nanyang and his children visited him, crying bitterly, but Xiao Baoyin was not mournful, merely stating, "This is heaven's wish. I only regret that I had not been a proper subject."
