= Wang Shaoming =

Chinese Empress

- Empress of Southern Qi
- Reign: 494
- Born: Unknown; China
- Died: Unknown; China
- Spouse: Xiao Zhaowen, Prince of Hailing
- Dynasty: Southern Qi
- Father: Wang Ci
- Religion: Confucianism (presumed)

Wang Shaoming (王韶明) (fl.490 – 494) was an empress of the Chinese Southern Qi dynasty. Her husband was Xiao Zhaowen, known by his post-removal title of Prince of Hailing.

Wang Shaoming was the daughter of the official Wang Ci (王慈), who came from a noble line with several ancestors being prime ministers, including the Jin prime minister Wang Dao and the Liu Song prime minister Wang Hong. One of her sisters married Emperor Gao's son Xiao Feng (蕭鋒) the Prince of Jiangxia. In 490, when Xiao Zhaowen, grandson of Emperor Gao's son Emperor Wu, was 10 and carried the title Duke of Linru, he married her, and she carried the title Duchess of Linru. In 493, after Emperor Wu died and was succeeded by Xiao Zhaowen's half-brother Xiao Zhaoye, Xiao Zhaowen was created the Prince of Xin'an, and Duchess Wang therefore became the Princess of Xin'an. In 494, Xiao Zhaoye's granduncle Xiao Luan assassinated Xiao Zhaoye and made Xiao Zhaowen emperor. Princess Wang was therefore created empress, but on 5 December, Xiao Luan deposed Xiao Zhaowen and took over himself as emperor (as Emperor Ming). Xiao Zhaowen was reduced to the title of Prince of Hailing, and Empress Wang was demoted to the title of Princess of Hailing. Later that month, Emperor Ming had Xiao Zhaowen poisoned. Nothing further is known about Empress Wang, including when she died or whether she was buried with her husband (whom Emperor Ming had buried with great honors, but not honors due an emperor).

Chinese royalty
Preceded by Empress He	Empress of Southern Qi; 494	Succeeded by Empress Chu
