= He Jingying =

Empress of the Southern Qi dynasty

He Jingying (何婧英) (fl.482 – 494) was an empress (and the first living empress) of the Chinese Southern Qi dynasty. Her husband was Xiao Zhaoye, who is commonly known by his posthumously demoted title of Prince of Yulin.

== Life ==
He Jingying's father He Ji (何戢; 447-482) was a high-level official during the reigns of Xiao Zhaoye's great-grandfather Emperor Gao and grandfather Emperor Wu of Southern Qi. Her mother Lady Song was He Ji's concubine. He Ji's wife Liu Chuyu the Princess Kuaiji was the daughter of Emperor Xiaowu of Song; later, because He Jingying was adulterous, just as Liu Chuyu was, some historians erroneously reported Liu Chuyu as He Jingying's birth mother, but that was not true.

=== As Crown Princess ===
In 484, when Xiao Zhaoye's father Xiao Zhangmao the Crown Prince was considering whom to take as a wife for his oldest son Xiao Zhaoye, he considered a number of daughters of nobles. Initially, he rejected He Jingying on account of He Ji being sonless and therefore did not have a strong household. The prime minister Wang Jian pointed out that since Xiao Zhaoye would be in line to inherit the throne in the future, he only needed a wife of noble birth, not necessarily one with a strong clan. Xiao Zhangmao agreed and took He Jingying as Xiao Zhaoye's wife. As Xiao Zhaoye carried the title of Prince of Nan Commandery, He Jingying received the title of Princess of Nan Commandery.

He Jingying was known for her adulterous activities, as she had affairs with others while she was princess. The most well-known affair she carried out was with Xiao Zhaoye's attendant Yang Min (楊珉): it was said that they spent day and night together, just like husband and wife. However, He Jingying was also very loving in her relationship with Xiao Zhaoye and they had a happy marriage, and so Xiao Zhaoye turned a blind eye to the affair. Some historians indicate that there could have also been a sexual relationship between Xiao Zhaoye and Yang Min, suggesting a ménage à trois. On 31 May 493, after Crown Prince Zhangmao died in February that year, Xiao Zhaoye became crown prince; Princess He became crown princess. Outwardly, he mourned his father's death and was worried about his grandfather Emperor Wu's health, as Emperor Wu was also in ill health at the time, but when he wrote to the Crown Princess, he wrote one large character of Xi (喜, meaning "happiness") surrounded by 36 smaller Xi characters.

=== As Empress ===
Later that year, Emperor Wu died. Xiao Zhaoye succeeded him as emperor, and made Crown Princess He empress. He took her family members into the palace and set up quarters for them in Yaoling Palace (耀靈殿) - a major breach of protocol at the time. As empress, Empress He continued her affair with Yang Min. In early 494, Xiao Zhaoye's granduncle, the prime minister Xiao Luan sent the trusted general Xiao Tanzhi (蕭坦之) to advise Xiao Zhaoye to execute Yang Min, and initially, Xiao Zhaoye refused, and Empress He tearfully pleaded for Yang's life. Xiao Tanzhi, however, pointed out how the news of the affair between Empress He and Yang had become widespread. Xiao Zhaoye was forced to agree, and he issued an edict for Yang's execution. When he subsequently tried to withdraw the verdict after Xiao Tanzhi left, it was too late; Yang had been executed.

In fall 494, with Xiao Zhaoye despising Xiao Luan for his constant curbing of his activity, Xiao Luan became apprehensive, and he assassinated the young emperor on 7 September, after first demoting him to the title of Prince of Yulin on 6 September. Empress He was demoted to the title of Princess of Yulin. Nothing further was recorded in history of her activities or the date of her death.

Chinese royalty
New dynasty	Empress of Southern Qi; 493–494	Succeeded by Empress Wang
Preceded by Empress Xie Fanjing of Liu Song	Empress of China (Southern); 493–494	Succeeded by Empress Wang
