= Wang Baoming =

Empress dowager of Chinese Southern Qi dynasty (455-512)

- Born: 455
- Died: 512 (aged 56–57)
- Spouse: Xiao Zhangmao
- Issue: Xiao Zhaoye
- Father: Wang Yezhi

Wang Baoming (王寶明) (455 – 20 December 512), formally Empress An (安皇后, literally "the peaceful empress"), semi-formally Empress Dowager Xuande (宣德太后), was an empress dowager of the Chinese Southern Qi dynasty. She was never empress regnant or empress consort, being the wife of Xiao Zhangmao, the oldest son and crown prince of Emperor Wu, who was posthumously honored as an emperor, and the mother of his son Xiao Zhaoye, who later became emperor.

== Biography ==
=== Early life ===
Wang Baoming's grandfather, Wang Shaozhi (王韶之), and father, Wang Yezhi (王曄之), were mid-level officials during the Liu Song dynasty. During the reign of Emperor Houfei of Liu Song, when Xiao Daocheng was a Liu Song general, Xiao Daocheng had already taken her as his grandson Xiao Zhangmao's wife, and in 473 she gave birth to Xiao Zhangmao's oldest son Xiao Zhaoye. In 474, when Xiao Daocheng's mansion was being ransacked by pillagers during the rebellion of Emperor Houfei's uncle Liu Xiufan (劉休範) the Prince of Guiyang, Xiao Zhangmao and his brother Xiao Ziliang (蕭子良) took Wang Baoming, Xiao Zhangmao's mother Pei Huizhao (裴惠昭), and Lady Yu, the wife of Xiao Zhangmao's uncle Xiao Ni and took refuge in the house of Wang Baoming's elder brother Wang Bingzhi (王昺之), and did not leave until Liu Xiufan's rebellion had been suppressed by Xiao Daocheng.

=== During Southern Qi ===
After Xiao Daocheng took over the throne in 479, ending Liu Song and establishing Southern Qi (as its Emperor Gao), Xiao Zhangmao, as his oldest grandson, was created the Prince of Nan Commandery, and Wang Baoming became the Princess of Nan Commandery. After Emperor Gao died in 482 and was succeeded by Xiao Zhangmao's father Xiao Ze (as Emperor Wu), Xiao Zhangmao was created crown prince, and Princess Wang became crown princess. She was not favored by Xiao Zhangmao, and it was said that while the luxury-loving crown prince gave many of his concubines new clothes and jewelry, the crown princess was using old items. After Xiao Zhangmao died in February 493, Xiao Zhaoye was created crown prince, and Crown Princess Wang carried the title of crown princess dowager. After Emperor Wu died later that year, Xiao Zhaoye succeeded him as emperor, and he honored her as empress dowager, setting her household at Xuande Palace (宣德宮), thus giving rise to her later semi-formal title. In a rather unusual action, he gave her 30 male attendants who were not eunuchs; however, whether they were serving as her lovers is not clear. Whether truthful or not, they have, however, been referred to as her male concubines.

In 494, Xiao Zhaoye was assassinated by the prime minister Xiao Luan, who, issuing an edict in Empress Dowager Wang's name, deposed him and demoted him to the title of Prince of Yulin on 6 September 494. Xiao Luan continued to honor her as empress dowager, and initially made Xiao Zhangmao's son by his concubine Lady Xu, Xiao Zhaowen, emperor, although he himself controlled the regime. Later that year, he deposed (again in the name of Empress Dowager Wang) and killed Xiao Zhaowen as well, taking over the throne personally (as Emperor Ming). Empress Dowager Wang, while still carrying her title, vacated the palace and took up residence at the old mansion of Emperor Wu's brother Xiao Qiang (蕭鏘) the Prince of Poyang, whom Xiao Luan had killed as well, and the residence became known as Xuande Palace as well.

=== Death ===
Empress Dowager Wang's activities during the reigns of Emperor Ming and his son Xiao Baojuan are not completely clear. On 31 December 501, after a military rebellion by the general Xiao Yan had led to the death of Xiao Baojuan, Xiao Yan formally had Empress Dowager Wang become regent, even though he was actually in power, and it was in an edict issued in her name that Xiao Baojuan was demoted to the title of Marquess of Donghun on 3 January 502. In 502, Xiao Yan had Xiao Baojuan's brother Emperor He, whom he had put on the throne in 501 during his rebellion, yield the throne to him, and Empress Dowager Wang issued an edict confirming the transfer as well, formally ending Southern Qi and starting Liang Dynasty. Empress Dowager Wang was given a convoluted title of "Princess of Emperor Wen of Qi." She died in 512 and was posthumously honored as empress and buried with her husband Xiao Zhangmao, with imperial honors.
