= Emperor He of Southern Qi =

Emperor He of Southern Qi 南齊和帝

Emperor of Southern Qi
- Reign: 501-502
- Predecessor: Xiao Baojuan
- Born: 488
- Died: 2 May 502 (aged 13–14)
- Burial: Gong'an Mausoleum (恭安陵)
Names
- Xiāo Bǎoróng (蕭寶融)
Era name and dates
- Zhōngxīng (中興): 501-502
Posthumous name
- Emperor He (和皇帝)
- Father: Emperor Ming
- Mother: Empress Liu Huiduan

Emperor He of Southern Qi ((南)齊和帝) (488 – 2 May 502; r. 14 April 501– 20 April 502), personal name Xiao Baorong (蕭寶融), courtesy name Zhizhao (智昭), was the last emperor of the Chinese Southern Qi dynasty. He was put on the throne by the generals Xiao Yingzhou (蕭穎冑) and Xiao Yan in 501 as a competing candidate and substitute for the throne to his violent and arbitrary older brother Xiao Baojuan. In 502, with Xiao Baojuan having been defeated and killed and Xiao Yingzhou dead, Xiao Yan seized the throne from Emperor He and took the throne himself, ending the Southern Qi dynasty and starting the Liang dynasty. Soon, Xiao Yan had the 14-year-old former Emperor He put to death.

== Background ==
Xiao Baorong was born in 488, when his father Xiao Luan was the Marquess of Xichang and a mid-high-level official under Emperor Wu, a cousin of Xiao Luan's. His mother was Xiao Luan's wife Marchioness Liu Huiduan (劉惠端), who died the following year (489). After Xiao Luan seized power from and killed Emperor Wu's grandson Xiao Zhaoye in a coup in 494, and then further took the throne later that year from Xiao Zhaoye's brother Xiao Zhaowen as Emperor Ming, Xiao Baorong, as the new emperor's son, was created the Prince of Sui Commandery (随郡王). In 499 (after Emperor Ming's death in 498), Xiao Baorong's older brother Xiao Baojuan, who had inherited the throne, changed his title to Prince of Nankang instead. (Sometime between 494 and 499, Xiao Baorong married Wang Shunhua, the granddaughter of the early Southern Qi prime minister Wang Jian, as his wife.) Also in 499, Xiao Baojuan made Xiao Baorong the governor of the important Jing Province (荊州, modern central and western Hubei), although the actual responsibilities for governing the province were in staff members' hands, particularly those of the chief of staff, Xiao Yingzhou.

== Rebellion against Xiao Baojuan ==
Xiao Baojuan was an arbitrary and violent ruler, and he often executed high-level officials based on his perception of them as threats to his rule. In winter 500, he executed his prime minister Xiao Yi (蕭懿), and Xiao Yi's brother Xiao Yan, the governor of Yong Province (雍州, modern northwestern Hubei) declared a rebellion from the capital of Yong Province, Xiangyang (襄陽, in modern Xiangfan, Hubei). In response, Xiao Baojuan sent the general Liu Shanyang (劉山陽) to Jing Province, ordering him to rendezvous with Xiao Yingzhou and then attack Xiangyang. Xiao Yan, however, persuaded Xiao Yingzhou that Liu's orders were to attack both Jing and Yong Provinces, and Xiao Yingzhou, after making Liu believe his good faith by executing Xiao Yan's messenger Wang Tianhu (王天虎), surprised and killed Liu, seizing his forces. He then openly declared rebellion and supported Xiao Baorong as nominal leader. Xiao Yingzhou and Xiao Baorong remained at Jiangling (江陵, in modern Jingzhou, Hubei), the capital of Jing Province, which was then made into the provisional capital, while Xiao Yan advanced east against Xiao Baojuan's forces. In spring 501, Xiao Baorong was proclaimed emperor (as Emperor He), but actual powers were in Xiao Yingzhou's hands.

While Xiao Yan's campaign east initially stalemated at Yingcheng (郢城, in modern Wuhan, Hubei), by fall 501 he had captured Yingcheng and continued to advance east. He quickly arrived at the capital Jiankang, putting it under siege. (During the siege of Jiankang, Xiao Yingzhou, anxious over the facts that Xiao Baojuan's general Xiao Gui (蕭璝) was approaching Jiangling and that Xiao Yan was so easily able to reach Jiankang and becoming popularly supported, died; from that point on, Emperor He was controlled by Xiao Yingzhou's lieutenant Xiahou Xiang (夏侯詳) and Xiao Yan's brother Xiao Dan (蕭憺), both of whom supported Xiao Yan.) Xiao Baojuan's forces, commanded by the generals Wang Zhenguo (王珍國) and Zhang Ji (張稷) were initially able to hold the defenses. However, Xiao Baojuan's associates and henchmen then told him that they believed that the reason why Jiankang remained under siege was that Wang and Zhang were not fighting with all their strength—which led Wang and Zhang to be apprehensive, and they assassinated Xiao Baojuan and surrendered.

== After Xiao Baojuan's defeat ==
Xiao Yan, after triumphing over Xiao Baojuan, for several months appeared to act as if Emperor He did not exist, having Xiao Zhaoye's mother Empress Dowager Wang Baoming serve as titular regent in Jiankang instead and effectively ruling in her name. He had her grant him progressively higher titles, including the titles of Duke of Liang and then Prince of Liang, and also granting him the nine bestowments. All of Xiao Baorong's brothers were gradually killed, except for Xiao Baoyi (蕭寶義) the Prince of Jin'an, who was disabled, and Xiao Baoyin the Prince of Poyang, who fled to Northern Wei, and Xiao Baoyuan the Prince of Luling, who would soon die of illness. Only in late spring 502 did Xiao Dan send Emperor He on a journey back east toward the capital, but before he reached the capital, Xiao Yan had him issue an edict yielding the throne to Xiao Yan, ending Southern Qi and starting the Liang Dynasty. The edict was confirmed and ratified by Empress Dowager Wang.

Xiao Yan (as Emperor Wu of Liang) initially created Xiao Baorong the Prince of Baling, issuing orders to have a palace built at Gushu (姑孰, in modern Ma'anshan, Anhui) for Xiao Baorong. However, just one day later, on advice of the official Shen Yue, who believed that Xiao Baorong would pose a future threat, Xiao Yan sent messengers to force Xiao Baorong to commit suicide by drinking poisoned wine. Xiao Baorong refused to commit suicide, but indicated that he was willing to be killed, and he got himself drunk. Xiao Yan's messenger Zheng Boqin (鄭伯禽) then killed him. He was buried with honors due an emperor.

== Consorts ==
- Empress, of the Wang clan of Langya (皇后 琊瑯王氏), personal name Shunhua (蕣華)

Regnal titles
Preceded by Xiao Baojuan (Marquess of Donghun)	Emperor of Southern Qi; 501–502	Dynasty destroyed
Preceded by Xiao Baojuan (Marquess of Donghun)	Emperor of China (Southern); 501–502	Succeeded by Emperor Wu of Liang
