= Chu Lingqu =

Chu Lingqu (褚令璩) (fl.495 - 502) was an empress of the Chinese Southern Qi dynasty. Her husband was Xiao Baojuan.

Chu Lingqu came from an aristocratic family, as the daughter of the official Chu Cheng (褚澄), a younger brother of Chu Yuan, who served as a high-level official during late Liu Song and later served as prime minister for Southern Qi's founding emperor, Emperor Gao; her mother was Princess Lujiang (廬江公主), daughter of Emperor Wen of Song. Xiao Baojuan's father Emperor Ming took Chu Lingqu to be the wife of Xiao Baojuan, who was then crown prince, on 16 December 495, and she thereafter carried the title of Crown Princess. She was not favored by Xiao Baojuan, who was, according to the History of the Southern Dynasties, carrying on an incestuous affair with his sister the Princess Shanyin. However, after Emperor Ming died in 498 and was succeeded by Xiao Baojuan, Xiao Baojuan did create Crown Princess Chu empress. She continued to be not favored, however, and the couple had no children. (His favorite was Consort Pan Yunu, and his only known son Xiao Song (蕭誦) was born of Consort Huang, who died shortly after giving birth to Xiao Song. Empress Chu might have raised Xiao Song as her own son.)

Xiao Baojuan was a violent ruler who executed officials whimsically, and this eventually drew a number of rebellions, the last of which, by the general Xiao Yan, overthrew him, as he was assassinated within the capital Jiankang in 501 as Xiao Yan sieged it. Once Xiao Yan entered the capital, he had Xiao Baojuan posthumously demoted to the title of Marquess of Donghun, and he had both Empress Chu and Crown Prince Song demoted to commoner status. Nothing further is known in history about her, including when she died.

Chinese royalty
Preceded by Empress Wang	Empress of Southern Qi; 498–501	Succeeded by Empress Wang
