= Lingqu (disambiguation) =

The Lingqu is a canal in Xing'an County, Guangxi, China.

Lingqu may also refer to:

- Lingqu, Tibet

== See also ==
- Chu Lingqu (褚令璩), an empress of the Chinese dynasty Southern Qi
