= Prince of Yuzhang =

Prince of Yuzhang may refer to:

- Emperor Huai of Jin (284–313), known as Prince of Yuzhang before he took the throne
- Xiao Ni (444–492), Liang dynasty prince
- Xiao Dong (died 552), Liang dynasty emperor, known as Prince of Yuzhang before he took the throne
