= Prince of Yulin =

Prince of Yulin may refer to:

- Xiao Zhaoye (473–494), Liang dynasty emperor
- Li Ke (619–653), Tang dynasty prince
