= Zhaowen =

Zhaowen may refer to:

- Li Shou (300–343), formally Emperor Zhaowen of (Cheng) Han, emperor of the Chinese/Ba-Di state Cheng Han
- Murong Xi (385–407), formally Emperor Zhaowen of (Later) Yan, emperor of the Xianbei state Later Yan
- Xiao Zhaowen (480–494), emperor of the Southern Qi dynasty
