= Wang Shunhua =

Wang Shunhua (王蕣華) was an empress of the Chinese Southern Qi dynasty. Her husband was the final emperor of the dynasty, Emperor He.

Wang Shunhua's grandfather Wang Jian was an early Southern Qi prime minister, and her clan was one of the two most powerful ones among the honored clans of the Southern Dynasties. (Oddly enough, however, the historical accounts did not indicate which of Wang Jian's sons was her father.) She became married to Xiao Baorong when he was the Prince of Sui Commandery (sometime between 494 and 499), and she therefore carried the title of Princess of Sui. (Presumably, when he later became the Prince of Nankang in 499, her title was changed to Princess of Nankang.) After he was made emperor by the generals Xiao Yingzhou (蕭穎冑) and Xiao Yan in 501 as a competing candidate for the throne to his violent and arbitrary brother Xiao Baojuan, Princess Wang was created empress. After Xiao Yan seized the throne in 502, ending Southern Qi and starting Liang Dynasty, Xiao Baorong was created the Prince of Baling, but soon was killed by Xiao Yan. The former Empress Wang became known as the Princess of Baling. Nothing further is known about her, including when she died.

Chinese royalty
Preceded by Empress Chu	Empress of Southern Qi; 501–502	Dynasty ended
Preceded by Empress Chu	Empress of China (Southern); 501–502	Succeeded by Empress Zhang of Liang
