= Emperor He =

Emperor He may refer to the following Chinese emperors:

- Emperor He of Han (reign: 88–105)
- Emperor He of Southern Qi (reign: 501–502)
