= Wei Rui (Liang dynasty) =

General of Liang dynasty

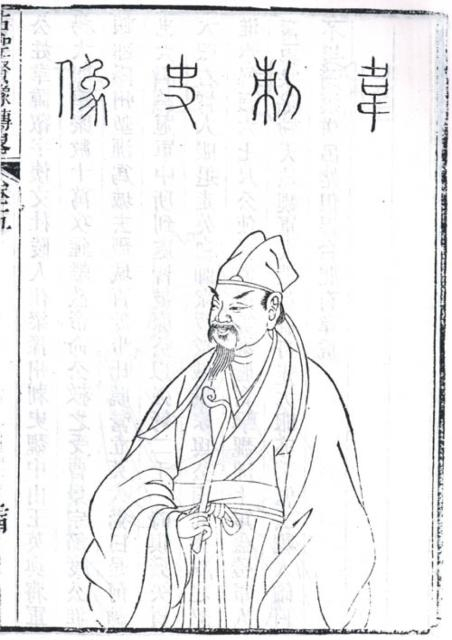
- Born: 442
- Died: 20 September 520
Names
- Family name: Wei (韋); Given name: Rui (叡); Courtesy name: Huaiwen (懷文) Title Marquis of Yongchang County (永昌縣侯)
Posthumous name
- Yan (嚴)
- Father: Wei Zugui (韋祖歸)
- Occupation: Politician and military general

Wei Rui (Chinese: 韋叡, 442–520), courtesy name Huaiwen, was a minister and military general of the Southern Qi and Liang dynasties during the Northern and Southern dynasties period. Considered as one of the greatest generals of the Southern dynasties, he first grew to prominence under Emperor Wu of Liang by assisting him in overthrowing the Southern Qi and establishing the Liang dynasty. In the war against the Northern Wei, Wei Rui captured the strategic city of Hefei and led the Liang army to a famous victory at the Battle of Zhongli, earning him the nickname, Tiger Wei (韋虎). His success against the Northern Wei stabilized the situation in southern China and paved the way for Emperor Wu's prosperous early reign.

== Biography ==
His grandfather, Wei Zusi, a descendant of Wei Xian, a chancellor of the Western Han Dynasty, lived in seclusion in the Nanshan Mountains of Chang'an. His uncle, Wei Zuzheng, was a guangluxun (Minister of Palace Attendants) in the late Song Dynasty. In his youth, Wei Rui served as the prefect of Shangrong County. At the end of the Southern Qi Dynasty, he participated in Xiao Yan's rebellion and devised numerous strategies, all of which were put to practical use.

In 505, Wei Rui led an expedition north, capturing the Northern Wei city of Xiaoxian (present-day Feidong County) and then marching toward Hefei. At that time, Northern Wei general Yang Lingyin arrived with an army of 50,000 to rescue them. Wei Rui diverted the Fei River, flooding the city, defeating the Wei forces and capturing over 10,000 prisoners.

In 506, he relieved the siege of Zhongli (present-day Linhaiguan Town, Fengyang County), and for his achievements was promoted to Marquis of Yongchang County and appointed General of the Right Guard. This battle is known as the Battle of Zhongli.

In the summer of 520, Wei Rui was promoted to Palace Attendant and General of the Chariots and Cavalry, but due to illness, he was unable to take up his duties. On September 20, 520, Wei Rui died at home. He was 79 years old. His will ordered a simple funeral and that he be buried in plain clothes. Emperor Wu of Liang personally attended the funeral and wept bitterly. He awarded Wei Rui 100,000 yuan, 200 pieces of cloth, the finest East Garden secret vessels, a full set of court robes, and a set of clothing. The funeral expenses were covered by the government, and a member of the Secretariat of the Central Secretariat was dispatched to oversee the funeral. Wei Rui was awarded the titles of Palace Attendant, General of the Chariots and Cavalry, and Chief of the Kaifu Yitongsansi, and was given the posthumous name Yan (严).

Historical records describe Wei Rui as a kind and compassionate man, both to people and animals. "He would not leave his camp until his soldiers had pitched their tents, and would not eat until the wells and stoves were completed." The people of the Northern Wei dynasty feared Wei Rui, and one song even sang about him: "Don't fear the woman-like Xiao Hong or the old woman-like Lu Sengzhen, but the tiger-like Wei Rui of Hefei."
