= Xiao Zhangmao =

Southern Qi Dynasty crown prince (458-493)

- Born: 458
- Died: 493 (aged 34–35)
- Consorts: Empress Wen'an
- Issue: Xiao Zhaoye; Xiao Zhaowen; Xiao Zhaoxiu
- Father: Emperor Wu
- Mother: Empress Wumu

Xiao Zhangmao (Note: Whether his name should be pronounced "Zhangmao" or "Changmao" in modern Mandarin, obviously, is somewhat speculative, but given that he had a younger brother named Xiao Zimao (蕭子懋), it would appear that "Zhang" is appropriate since it denoted being older.) (蕭長懋) (458 – 25 February 493), courtesy name Yunqiao (雲喬), nickname Baize (白澤), formally Crown Prince Wenhui (文惠太子, literally "the civil and benevolent crown prince"), later further posthumously honored as Emperor Wen (文皇帝) with the temple name of Shizong (世宗), was a crown prince of the Chinese Southern Qi dynasty. He was Emperor Wu (Xiao Ze)'s oldest son but predeceased his father. After his death, his son Xiao Zhaoye became crown prince and eventually succeeded Emperor Wu but was soon thereafter overthrown by Emperor Wu's cousin Xiao Luan, who usurped the throne. By 498, all of Xiao Zhangmao's descendants had been exterminated.

== Background ==
Xiao Zhangmao was born in 458, when his father Xiao Ze was just 18, and because he was the oldest grandson of his grandfather Xiao Daocheng, who was a Liu Song general at the time, he was much favored by his grandfather. His mother was Xiao Ze's wife Pei Huizhao (裴惠昭). In 477, after Xiao Daocheng had seized power after assassinating the violent Emperor Houfei of Liu Song and made Emperor Houfei's brother Liu Zhun emperor (as Emperor Shun), the general Shen Youzhi rose against him from Jing Province (荊州, modern central and western Hubei), and as Xiao Ze defended Penkou (湓口, in modern Jiujiang, Jiangxi) in preparation for a possible eventual attack by Shen, he made Xiao Zhangmao his assistant in reviewing the troops. After Shen was defeated, Xiao Zhangmao initially returned to the capital Jiankang to serve under his grandfather, but subsequently was made the governor of Yong Province (雍州, modern southwestern Henan and northwestern Hubei).

== As Prince of Nan Commandery ==
In 479, Xiao Daocheng seized the throne from Emperor Shun, ending Liu Song and starting Southern Qi, as its Emperor Gao. Xiao Ze was created crown prince, and in an unprecedented action, Xiao Zhangmao was created the Prince of Nan Commandery (Prior to Xiao Zhangmao, there had not been any sons of living crown princes within the Southern Dynasties who were created imperial princes). In 480, he was recalled to Jiankang to serve as the defender of the key fortress Shitou. When his mother Crown Princess Pei died later that year, by suggestion of the prime minister Wang Jian, Prince Zhangmao was prevented from carrying out full mourning customs for his mother, due to the importance of his post, but his defense post was moved from Shitou to the important suburb of Xizhou (西州). In 482, he was made the governor of South Xu Province (南徐州, modern western central Jiangsu). After Emperor Gao died in 482, Xiao Ze succeeded him (as Emperor Wu), and Xiao Zhangmao was created crown prince. His wife Princess Consort Wang Baoming was created crown princess, and their oldest son Xiao Zhaoye was created the Prince of Nan Commandery.

== As crown prince ==
Xiao Zhangmao was close to his brother, Xiao Ziliang (蕭子良) the Prince of Jingling, and both were adherents of Buddhism. Despite his Buddhist beliefs, however, Xiao Zhangmao was wasteful and luxurious in his living—using many items that were appropriate only for emperors, although he was also praised as kind and hospitable. However, he was apprehensive of his impulsive but militarily-minded brother Xiao Zixiang (蕭子響) the Prince of Badong, and when Xiao Zixiang executed a number of his staff members in 490, drawing Xiao Ze's ire in sending troops against him, Xiao Zhangmao secretly instructed the general Xiao Shunzhi (蕭順之) (father of Emperor Wu of Liang, who founded a new dynasty) not to permit Xiao Zixiang to return to Jiankang alive, and later, even though Xiao Zixiang submitted to Xiao Shunzhi and requested to meet his father to confess his crimes, Xiao Shunzhi strangled Xiao Zixiang to death.

Xiao Zhangmao disliked Emperor Wu's cousin (Emperor Gao's nephew) Xiao Luan the Marquess of Xichang, and once told Xiao Ziliang:

I do not like him. I do not know the reason, but all I can say is that he does not have sufficient blessings.

Xiao Ziliang, who was friendly with Xiao Luan, tried to defend Xiao Luan, but Xiao Zhangmao would not hear it.

Late in Emperor Wu's reign, he favored time on feasting and tours, and he often had Crown Prince Zhangmao rule on important matters, and therefore the crown prince's authority was well established in the empire. However, he was also often ill, perhaps aggravated by his large build. In spring 493, he died. Emperor Wu soon created his son Xiao Zhaoye to succeed him as crown prince, and when Emperor Wu died later that year, Xiao Zhaoye became emperor, but was overthrown and killed by Xiao Luan in 494. Xiao Luan initially made Xiao Zhangmao's another son Xiao Zhaowen emperor, but later that year (in December) deposed and killed him as well and took over as emperor directly (as Emperor Ming). By 498, Emperor Ming had also killed Xiao Zhangmao's other two sons Xiao Zhaoxiu (蕭昭秀) the Prince of Baling and Xiao Zhaocan (蕭昭粲) the Prince of Guiyang, exterminating Xiao Zhangmao's line. Traditional historians attribute Emperor Ming's killing of Xiao Zhangmao's sons as payback for Xiao Zhangmao's dislike of him, but as modern historian Bo Yang observed, Emperor Ming also killed the sons of Emperors Gao and Wu, both of whom treated him with kindness and respect.

== Family ==
Consorts and Issue:

- Empress Wen'an, of the Wang clan of Langya (文安皇后 琊瑯王氏; 455–512), personal name Baoming (寶明)
  - Xiao Zhaoye, Prince Yulin (鬱林王 蕭昭業; 473–494), first son
- Lady, of the Xu clan (宮人 許氏)
  - Xiao Zhaowen, Prince Hailinggong (海陵恭王 蕭昭文; 480–494), second son
- Lady, of the Chen clan (宮人 陳氏)
  - Xiao Zhaoxiu, Prince Baling (巴陵王 蕭昭秀; 483–498), third son
- Lady, of the Chu clan (宮人 褚氏)
  - Xiao Zhaocan, Prince Guiyang (桂陽王 蕭昭粲; 491–498), fourth son
