= Xiao Zixian =

Chinese historian and compiler of Book of Southern Qi (c.489 -c.537)

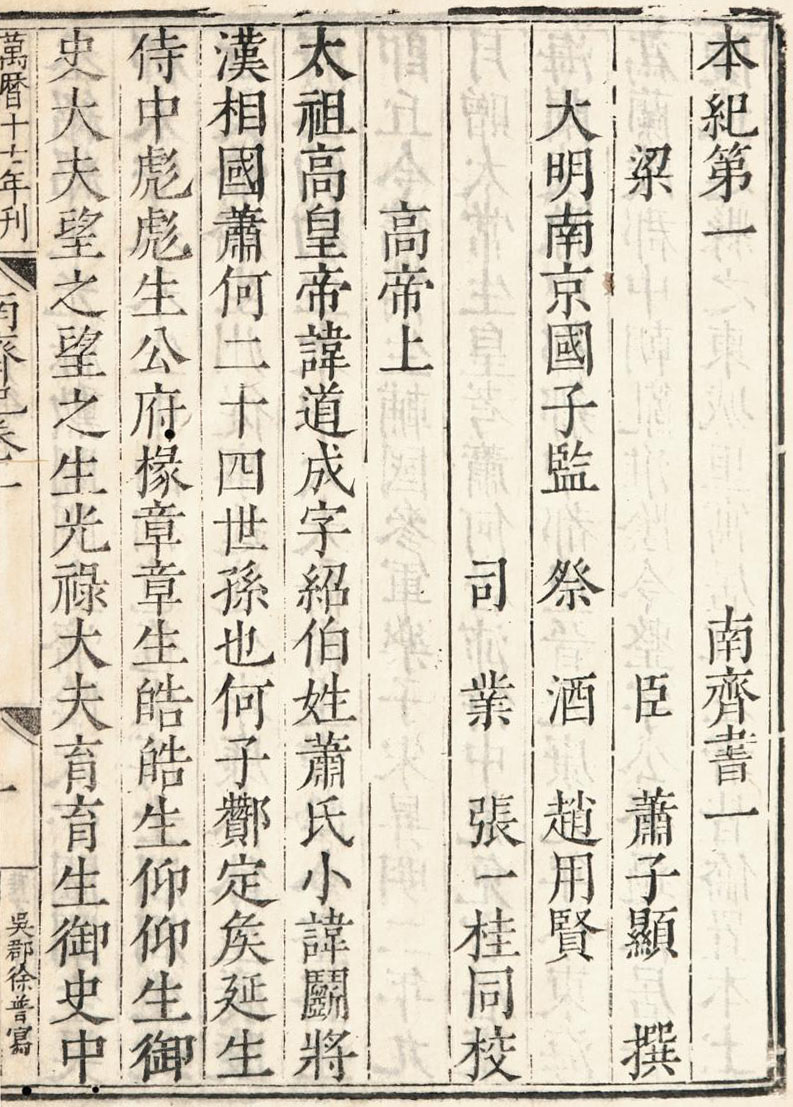
A page from a Ming Dynasty edition of the Book of Qi by Xiao Zixian.

Xiao Zixian (simplified Chinese: 萧子显; traditional Chinese: 蕭子顯; pinyin: Xiāo Zǐ Xiǎn, c.489–c.537), courtesy name Jingyang (景陽) or Jingchang (景暢), formally Viscount Jiao of Ningdu (寧都驕子), was a Chinese historian best known for producing the Book of Qi (also known as Book of Southern Qi), part of the Twenty-Four Histories. He was the only author of the Twenty-Four Histories to be a member of the chronicled dynasty's ruling house.

== Works ==
Xiao Zixian produced the following books:

- Book of Qi (齐书)
- Book of the Later Han (后汉书)
- Jinshicao (晋史草)
- Putong Bei Fa Ji (普通北伐记)
- Gui Jian Zhuan (贵俭传)

== Family ==
Xiao Zixian's grandfather was Xiao Daocheng (Emperor Gao of Southern Qi), and his father was Emperor Gao's second son Xiao Ni, the Prince of Yuzhang.

Xiao Zixian was the fifth son of Xiao Ni. His elder brothers were (in descending order of seniority) Xiao Zilian (萧子廉), Xiao Zike (萧子恪), Xiao Zicao (萧子操), and Xiao Zifan (萧子範). Xiao Zixian had two younger brothers: Xiao Ziyun (萧子雲) and Xiao Zihui (萧子晖).
