= Emperor Ming of Southern Qi =

Emperor Ming of Southern Qi 南齊明帝

Emperor of Southern Qi
- Reign: 5 December 494 – 1 September 498
- Predecessor: Xiao Zhaowen
- Successor: Xiao Baojuan
- Born: Xiao Xuandu (蕭玄度); 452
- Died: 498 (aged 45–46)
- Burial: Xing'an Mausoleum (興安陵)
- Spouse: Liu Huiduan
Names
- Xiāo Luán (蕭鸞)
Era dates
- Jiànwǔ (建武): 494-498; Yǒngtài (永泰): 498
Posthumous name
- Emperor Míng (明皇帝)
Temple name
- Gāozōng (高宗)
- Father: Xiao Daosheng, Prince Zhen of Shian (Emperor Jing); Xiao Daocheng (adoptive)
- Mother: Lady Jiang (Empress Yi)

Emperor Ming of Southern Qi ((南)齊明帝) (452 – 1 September 498), personal name Xiao Luan (蕭鸞), courtesy name Jingqi (景棲), childhood name Xuandu (玄度), was an emperor of the Southern Qi dynasty of China. He was a nephew of the Southern Qi founder Emperor Gao, who later became prime minister during the reign of Emperor Gao's great-grandson Xiao Zhaoye.

Believing that Xiao Zhaoye was an incompetent emperor who might act against him, Xiao Luan carried out a coup d'état and assassinated Xiao Zhaoye. After briefly making Xiao Zhaoye's brother Xiao Zhaowen emperor, he deposed Xiao Zhaowen as well, and took over himself as emperor. During his reign, he was known for being exacting and demanding, but also being frugal. He is seen as a very dark figure in history, because he slaughtered the surviving sons of Emperor Gao and Emperor Gao's son Emperor Wu, despite their kindness toward him.

== Background ==
Xiao Luan was born in 452. His mother's name is lost to history, and his father was Xiao Daosheng (蕭道生), a mid-low-level official during Liu Song. Xiao Daosheng died early, and Xiao Luan was raised by Xiao Daosheng's younger brother Xiao Daocheng, a Liu Song general. He had two brothers, Xiao Feng (蕭鳳), who was older, and Xiao Mian (蕭緬), who was younger. Xiao Daocheng was said to have loved Xiao Luan greatly, even more so than his own sons. In 472, at the age of 20, Xiao Luan was made a county magistrate, and during the next few years, as his uncle's powers increased, he was promoted through a number of positions, becoming a general in 478. When Xiao Daocheng took over the throne from Emperor Shun of Liu Song in 479, ending Liu Song and establishing Southern Qi, he created Xiao Luan the Marquess of Xichang.

== During Emperors Gao and Wu's reigns ==
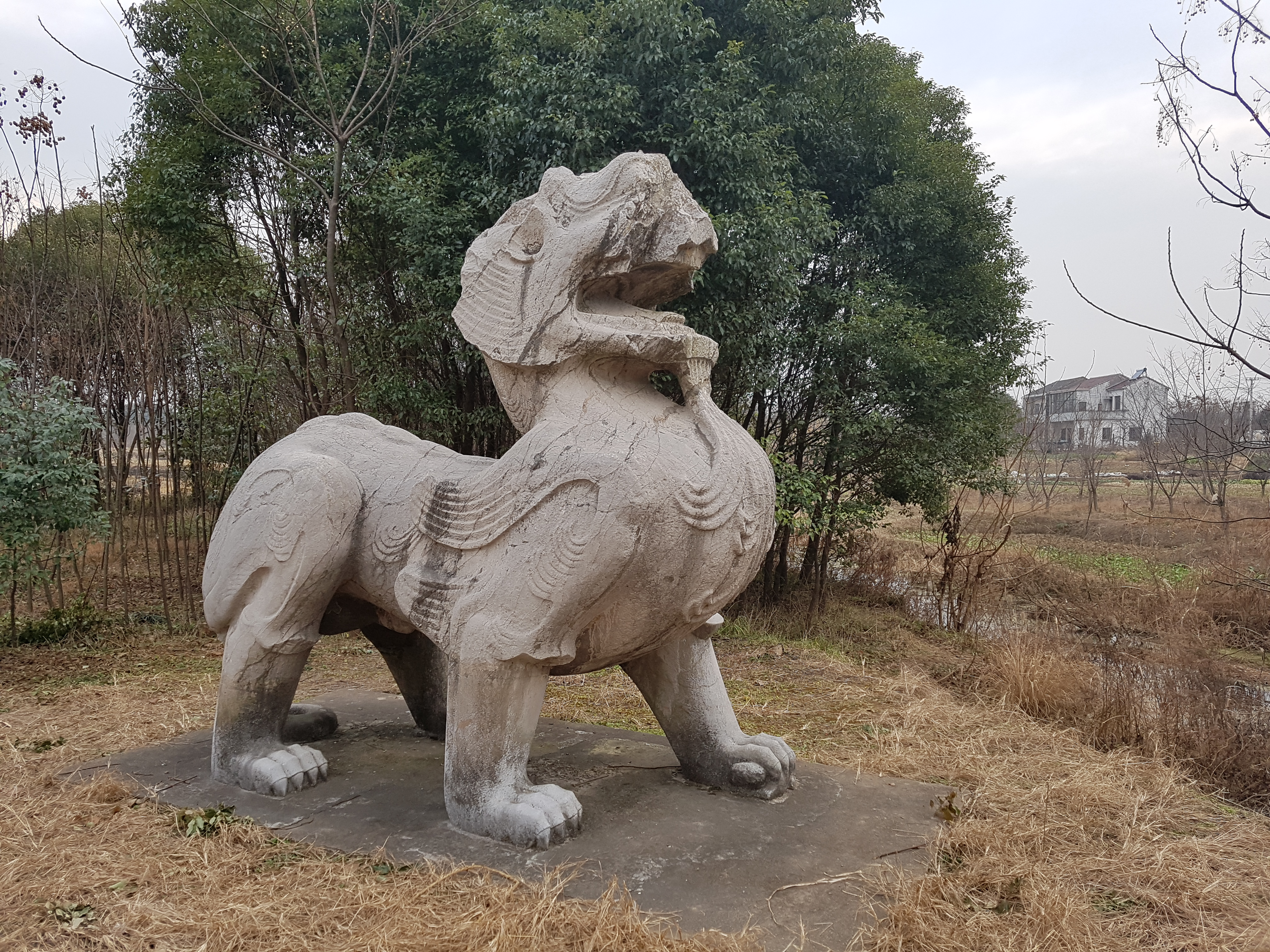
Tianlu statue at the tomb of Emperor Ming

During the reigns of Emperors Gao and Wu, Xiao Luan was steadily promoted, until he reached the higher echelon of power late in the reign of Emperor Wu. He was well regarded by the public and officials alike for his humble attitude and frugality in living, as he did not use luxury items and took on the clothing of an ordinary member of the intelligentsia. At one time, Emperor Wu considered making him the minister in charge of the civil service, but Emperor Wu changed his mind after the idea was opposed by the official Wang Yan (王晏), who believed that Xiao Luan was capable but did not know powerful clans well, and therefore would be ill-equipped to handle the civil service, which at the time weighed the officials' lineages heavily in decisions. Xiao Luan was friendly with Emperor Wu's son Xiao Ziliang (蕭子良) the Prince of Jingling, who served as prime minister. However, Emperor Wu's crown prince Xiao Zhangmao did not like him, and Xiao Ziliang had to defend Xiao Luan before Xiao Zhangmao, and often endorsed Xiao Luan to Emperor Wu. As a result, after the Xiao Zhangmao's death in 493, Emperor Wu, who was himself ill later in the year, designated Xiao Ziliang and Xiao Luan in his will to be the two individuals in charge of the government for his new crown prince, Xiao Zhangmao's son Xiao Zhaoye. Xiao Luan was subsequently instrumental in discovering and thwarting the plot of the official Wang Rong (王融), who tried to divert succession of the throne to Xiao Ziliang. When Emperor Wu died soon thereafter, Xiao Zhaoye succeeded to the throne.

== During Xiao Zhaoye's reign ==
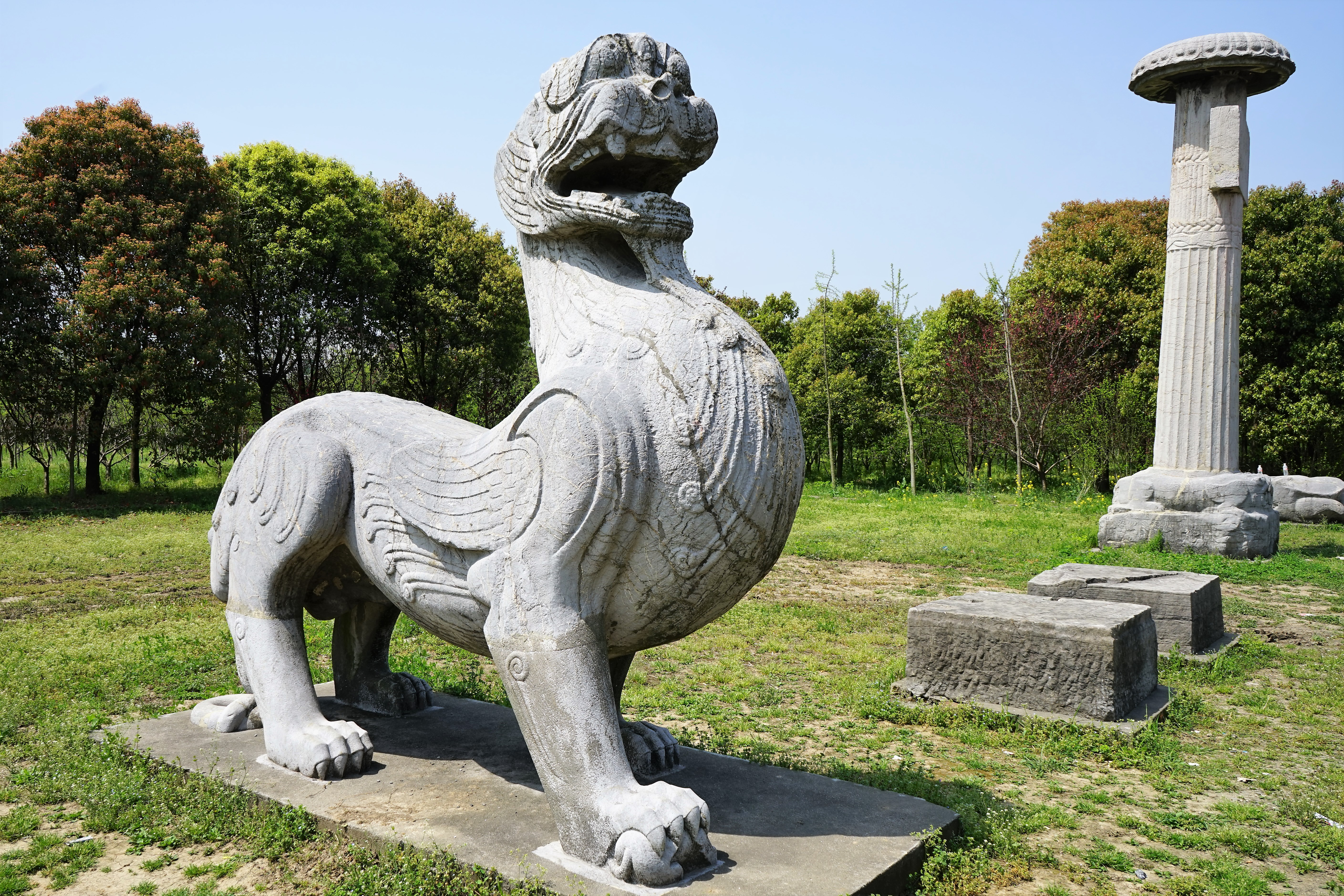
Sculpture at the tomb of Emperor Ming

As a result of Wang Rong's plot, Xiao Zhaoye distrusted Xiao Ziliang, and while he granted Xiao Ziliang highly honored titles, actual power rested in Xiao Luan's hands. Soon, however, Xiao Zhaoye demonstrated himself to be a frivolous ruler, spending most of his time in feast and games while expending the treasury surpluses that Emperors Gao and Wu had built up. Xiao Luan tried several times to counsel him to change his ways, with no changes in his behavior, and Xiao Zhaoye in fact began to suspect Xiao Luan and wanted to kill him, but could not resolve to do so, particularly after he consulted with his granduncle (Emperor Wu's son) Xiao Qiang (蕭鏘) the Prince of Poyang, and Xiao Qiang opposed the action. Meanwhile, Xiao Luan also became suspicious that Xiao Zhaoye was going to kill him, and therefore began to set up relationships with key generals—including Xiao Chen (蕭諶) and Xiao Tanzhi (蕭坦之), both of whom were well-trusted by Xiao Zhaoye—while finding pretexts to remove close associates of Xiao Zhaoye, including Xiao Zhaoye's wife He Jingying's lover Yang Min (楊珉), the eunuch Xu Longju (徐龍駒), the general Zhou Fengshu (周奉叔), the teacher Du Wenqian (杜文謙), and the head of the household Qiwu Zhenzhi (綦毋珍之). However, Xiao Zhaoye appeared to be unaware of Xiao Luan's actual intentions, and his own alertness decreased after Xiao Ziliang died of anxiety in summer 494.

By fall 494, however, Xiao Zhaoye was tired of Xiao Luan, and he plotted with Empress He's uncle He Yin (何胤) to have Xiao Luan killed. He Yin did not dare to do so, and suggested that Xiao Luan be observed further. Xiao Zhaoye therefore stopped giving important tasks to Xiao Luan. Xiao Luan then started his coup, in conjunction with Xiao Chen and Xiao Tanzhi—and Xiao Zhaoye, not realizing that Xiao Chen and Xiao Tanzhi had betrayed him, sought help from Xiao Chen when he realized Xiao Luan was beginning an attack on the palace. His hopes were dashed when he saw Xiao Chen enter the palace. His palace guards were still ready to fight, but Xiao Zhaoye instead fled, and Xiao Chen chased him down and killed him. On 6 September 494, Xiao Luan issued an edict in Empress Dowager Wang's name, demoting Xiao Zhaoye to the rank of prince (with the title of Prince of Yulin, which became the title he was thereafter known for) and making his younger brother Xiao Zhaowen the Prince of Xin'an emperor.

== During Xiao Zhaowen's reign ==
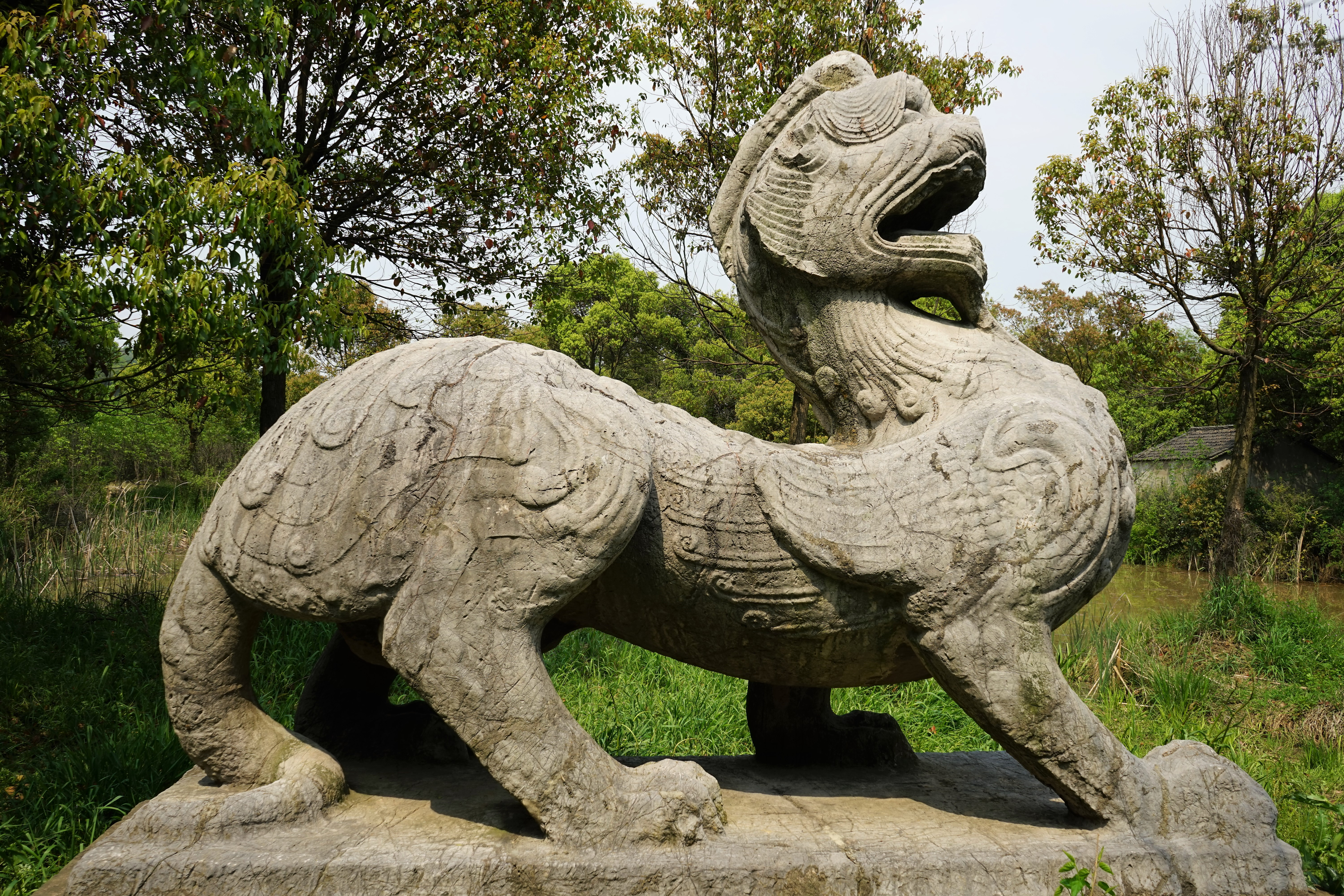
Tianlu statue at Emperor Ming's tomb

While Xiao Zhaowen, now 14, carried the title of emperor, actual authority was in the hands of Xiao Luan, and Xiao Luan had himself initially created the Duke of Xuancheng, and then the Prince of Xuancheng. In Xiao Zhaowen's name, Xiao Luan soon carried out the executions of a large number of princes who were sons of Emperors Gao and Wu, whom he viewed as threats against himself:

- Xiao Qiang (蕭鏘), the Prince of Poyang, son of Emperor Gao
- Xiao Zilong (蕭子隆), the Prince of Sui, son of Emperor Wu
- Xiao Zimao (蕭子懋), the Prince of Jin'an, son of Emperor Wu
- Xiao Zijing (蕭子敬), the Prince of Anlu, son of Emperor Wu
- Xiao Rui (蕭銳), the Prince of Nanping, son of Emperor Gao
- Xiao Qiu (蕭銶), the Prince of Jinxi, son of Emperor Gao
- Xiao Keng (蕭鏗), the Prince of Yidu, son of Emperor Gao
- Xiao Shuo (蕭鑠), the Prince of Guiyang, son of Emperor Gao
- Xiao Jun (蕭鈞), the Prince of Hengyang, son of Emperor Gao
- Xiao Feng (蕭鋒), the Prince of Jiangxia, son of Emperor Gao
- Xiao Zizhen (蕭子真), the Prince of Jian'an, son of Emperor Wu
- Xiao Zilun (蕭子倫), the Prince of Baling, son of Emperor Wu
- Xiao Ziqing (蕭子卿), the Prince of Luling, son of Emperor Wu

Initially, Xiao Zhaowen's younger brother Xiao Zhaoxiu (蕭昭秀), the Prince of Linhai, was to be killed as well, but was spared at the last minute. In place of these imperial princes from Emperors Gao and Wu's lines, Xiao Luan, because his own sons were young, installed his nephews Xiao Yaoguang (蕭遙光), Xiao Yaoxin (蕭遙欣), and Xiao Yaochang (蕭遙昌) in important posts. Less than three months after Xiao Zhaowen became emperor, Xiao Luan issued an edict in the name of Xiao Zhangmao's wife Empress Dowager Wang Baoming, stating that Xiao Zhaowen was not sufficiently intelligent and healthy to be emperor, giving the throne to Xiao Luan, who then took the throne as Emperor Ming.

== Reign ==
Emperor Ming was commonly regarded as an intelligent and frugal ruler, and he took a hands-on approach to governance. He was, however, also known for his suspecting nature, and few high-level officials could feel safe during his reign. He also periodically continued to kill the descendants of (presumably to Emperors Gao and Wu) and cry bitterly, before carrying out the actions.

Emperor Ming created his second son Xiao Baojuan crown prince, as his oldest son Xiao Baoyi (蕭寶義) was said to be so disabled that he could not speak (and was also not born of Emperor Ming's wife Liu Huiduan (劉惠端), who had died in 489, long before he became emperor). As Emperor Ming's sons were young, he entrusted great responsibilities to his nephews Xiao Yaoguang, Xiao Yaoxin, and Xiao Yaochang. When Xiao Zhaowen was removed from the throne, the edict that Emperor Ming issued in Empress Dowager Wang's name created him the Prince of Hailing. About a month after he was removed from the throne, however, Emperor Ming, on pretenses that Xiao Zhaowen was ill, sent imperial physicians to see him, but instead instructed the physicians to have him poisoned. Xiao Zhaowen was given the posthumous name Gong (恭, meaning "respectful") and buried with great honors, but not imperial honors.

Meanwhile, Emperor Xiaowen of Northern Wei used Emperor Ming's usurpation of the throne as a pretense to launch a major attack against Southern Qi in late 494. After several largely inconclusive battles, however, Northern Wei forces abandoned the campaign in spring 495. As soon as the campaign was over, Emperor Ming executed Xiao Chen, one general he was allied with during the coup against Xiao Zhaoye, and Xiao Chen's brothers, as he suspected Xiao Chen of plotting a coup. He also, on pretense that they were plotting with Xiao Chen, executed Emperor Wu's sons Xiao Ziming (蕭子明) the Prince of Xiyang, Xiao Zihan (蕭子罕) the Prince of Nanhai, and Xiao Zizhen (蕭子貞) the Prince of Shaoling. In 497, he also killed the high-level official Wang Yan, who had also participated in the coup against Xiao Zhaoye, on suspicion of plotting against him.

In fall 497, Northern Wei's Emperor Xiaowen launched another major attack on Southern Qi. The results were again largely indecisive, although the key border city Wancheng (宛城, in modern Nanyang, Henan) fell to Northern Wei, as did Xinye (新野, also in modern Nanyang). Meanwhile, during the campaign, with Emperor Ming himself being ill, he, in consultation with Xiao Yaoguang, executed 10 more princes from Emperor Gao's line—all of the surviving sons of Emperors Gao and Wu and Xiao Zhangmao, as he perceived them to be threats to his own sons. Each time he conducted these killings, he would first offer incenses

- Xiao Xuan (蕭鉉), the Prince of Hedong, son of Emperor Gao
- Xiao Ziyue (蕭子岳), the Prince of Linhe, son of Emperor Wu
- Xiao Ziwen (蕭子文), the Prince of Xiyang, son of Emperor Wu
- Xiao Zijun (蕭子峻), the Prince of Hengyang, son of Emperor Wu
- Xiao Zilin (蕭子琳), the Prince of Nankang, son of Emperor Wu
- Xiao Zimin (蕭子珉), the Prince of Yongyang, son of Emperor Wu
- Xiao Zijian (蕭子建), the Prince of Xiangdong, son of Emperor Wu
- Xiao Zixia (蕭子夏), the Prince of Nan Commandery, son of Emperor Wu
- Xiao Zhaocan (蕭昭粲), the Prince of Guiyang, son of Xiao Zhangmao
- Xiao Zhaoxiu (蕭昭秀), the Prince of Baling, son of Xiao Zhangmao

What was particularly unusual about Emperor Ming's actions in executing these princes was that after he executed them, he ordered the high-level officials to accuse these princes of crimes and seek their executions—and then he first formally rejected the recommendations, and then accepted them. This was largely perceived as an attempt by him to be seen as only doing what was necessary.

In summer 498, the retired general Wang Jingze (王敬則), believing that Emperor Ming was about to have him executed, rebelled from his retirement place of Kuaiji (modern Shaoxing in Zhejiang). He claimed to want to support Emperor Gao's grandson (the son of Xiao Ni the Prince of Yuzhang) Xiao Zike (蕭子恪) the Marquess of Nankang as leader. As a result, Emperor Ming, again with counsel from Xiao Yaoguang, ordered all of the male descendants of Emperors Gao and Wu into the palace, ready to poison them. However, after Xiao Zike fled back to the capital Jiankang and showed that he was not part of Wang's rebellion, Emperor Ming changed his mind at the last moment and spared them. About 20 days after the start of Wang's rebellion, he was killed in battle, and his rebellion dissipated.

Three months later, Emperor Ming died. Crown Prince Baojuan succeeded him as emperor (later to be known as the Marquess of Donghun).

== Family ==
- Empress Mingjing, of the Liu clan (明敬皇后 劉氏; d. 489), personal name Huiduan (惠端)
  - Xiao Baojuan, Marquis Yang of Donghun (東昏煬侯 蕭寶卷; 483–501), second son
  - Xiao Baoxuan, Prince of Jiangxia (江夏王 蕭寶玄; d. 500), third son
  - Xiao Baoyin, Prince of Poyang (鄱陽王 蕭寶夤; 486–530), sixth son
  - Xiao Baorong, Emperor He (和皇帝 蕭寶融; 488–502), eighth son
- Guifei, of the Yuan clan (貴妃 袁氏)
  - Xiao Baoyuan, Prince Luling (廬陵王 蕭寶源; d. 502), fifth son
- Shufei, of the Guan clan (淑妃 管氏)
  - Xiao Baoyou, Prince of Shaoling (邵陵王 蕭寶攸; d. 502), ninth son
- Guipin, of the Yin clan (貴嬪 殷氏)
  - Xiao Baoyi, Prince of Jin'an (晉安王 蕭寶義; d. 509), first son
  - Xiao Baosong, Prince of Jinxi (晉熙王 蕭寶嵩; d. 502), tenth son
- Shuyuan, of the Xu clan (淑媛 許氏)
  - Xiao Baozhen, Prince of Guiyang (桂陽王 蕭寶貞; d. 502), 11th son
- Unknown
  - Princess Shanyin (山陰公主), first daughter

Regnal titles
| Preceded by Xiao Zhaowen (Prince of Hailing) | Emperor of Southern Qi; 494–498 | Succeeded by Xiao Baojuan (Marquess of Donghun) |
