= Xiao Ni =

Xiao Ni (蕭嶷) (c. 444 – 27 May 492), courtesy name Xuanyan (宣儼), formally Prince Wenxian of Yuzhang (豫章文獻王), was an imperial prince during the Chinese Southern Qi dynasty. He was a son of the founder Emperor Gao (Xiao Daocheng) and a brother of Emperor Wu (Xiao Ze).

== Background ==
Xiao Ni was born in 444 as the second son of Xiao Daocheng and his wife Liu Zhirong (劉智容), four years younger than his older brother Xiao Ze. Because Xiao Daocheng was a Liu Song general who contributed in military campaigns, Xiao Ni served in a number of low-level government posts early in his life, including as a county magistrate and as an administrator in the census bureau. Around 466, when his father was given a greater title for his contributions in Emperor Ming of Song's war for the throne with Liu Zixun, Xiao Ni was given his father's old title of Marquess of Jinshou. He later served as a general under his father during the rebellion of Emperor Ming's brother Liu Xiufan (劉休範) the Prince of Guiyang in 474, early in the reign of Emperor Ming's son Emperor Houfei.

By 477, the young but violent and arbitrary Emperor Houfei was universally feared by officials and the people, for he was in the habit of roving outside the palace with his guards, killing all humans or animals that they came in contact with. One night, Emperor Houfei and his guards descended on the Xiaos' old house in Qingxi (青溪), a suburb of the capital Jiankang, where Xiao Ni was residing. Xiao Ni had his guards perform a sword dance in the courtyard, and as Emperor Houfei saw it, he assumed that Xiao Ni would be ready for any attacks, and so left. Meanwhile, Xiao Ni's father Xiao Daocheng was fearful for his own life and, as suggested by his distant cousin and associate Xiao Shunzhi (蕭順之), considered going to Guangling (廣陵, in modern Yangzhou, Jiangsu) to start a rebellion there; Xiao Ni, however, opposed, reasoning that rebellions from afar rarely succeeded, and that because of Emperor Houfei's arbitrary behavior, it would be easier to act against him from within the capital. Xiao Daocheng agreed, and soon was able to conspire with Emperor Houfei's attendant Yang Yufu (楊玉夫) to assassinate Emperor Houfei and effectively take over the Liu Song, making Emperor Houfei's brother Liu Zhun emperor (as Emperor Shun), but in actuality his puppet. During this period, as Xiao Daocheng prepared to take over the throne, Xiao Ni carried the title of Duke of Yong'an, and in 478 (after Xiao Daocheng defeated Shen Youzhi, who opposed his seizure of power) was made the governor of the key Jing Province (荊州, modern central and western Hubei). In 479, Xiao Daocheng had Emperor Shun yield the throne to him, ending Liu Song and starting Southern Qi. He created Xiao Ni the Prince of Yuzhang.

== Under Emperor Gao ==
Soon after the establishment of Southern Qi, Emperor Gao recalled Xiao Ni back to Jiankang to serve as the governor of the capital region, Yang Province (揚州, modern Zhejiang and southern Jiangsu), a highly important post, and a post that he would retain for the rest of his life.

Xiao Ni was very close to his older brother Xiao Ze, who was created the crown prince after Emperor Gao took the throne. In one incident when Emperor Gao got exceedingly angry at Xiao Ze after being informed (while Xiao Ze was outside the capital) that both Crown Prince Ze and his jester Zhang Jingzhen (張景真) were being overly wasteful and using items that were only appropriate for emperors, it was Xiao Ni who rode on a horse to warn Xiao Ze what the situation was, allowing Xiao Ze to quickly return to Jiankang to react to the incident. Emperor Gao at one point considered replacing Xiao Ze with Xiao Ni, but because Xiao Ni served his brother carefully, their relationship was not affected.

In 482, Emperor Gao died. Xiao Ni was said to be mourning so bitterly that his eyes and ears bled. Crown Prince Ze succeeded Emperor Gao, as Emperor Wu.

== Under Emperor Wu ==
Emperor Wu conferred a number of honorific titles on Xiao Ni, and while publicly, Xiao Ni did not participate in policy decisions, in private they often discussed important matters of state, and Emperor Wu almost always listened to Xiao Ni's suggestions. He also frequently visited Xiao Ni's mansion, where both he and Xiao Ni would wear informal wear that brothers would wear while meeting with each other, rather than the formal clothing of an emperor and his subject. As a special honor, Emperor Wu also made Xiao Ni's wife Princess Yu be in charge of the ancestral worship of their parents and grandparents. Xiao Ni was said to be tall and attentive to his appearance, but careful in his actions. Several times he sought to transfer the powerful governorship of Yang Province to Emperor Wu's son Xiao Ziliang (蕭子良) the Prince of Jingling, who was also a trusted advisor of Emperor Wu, but Emperor Wu refused, telling Xiao Ni that the post was his for life.

Initially, Xiao Ni did not have any sons, and probably sometime during Emperor Gao's reign, he adopted Emperor Wu's son Xiao Zixiang (蕭子響) as his heir apparent -- a status that Xiao Zixiang, by Xiao Ni's request, continued to hold even after Xiao Ni had his own sons. However, in 488, after an incident where Xiao Zixiang threw a temper tantrum over not being able to wear the same style as his brothers (because his brothers were princes, while he was just the heir apparent of a prince), the adoption was rescinded, and Xiao Zixiang was returned to Emperor Wu's line and created the Prince of Badong. (Xiao Zixiang was subsequently executed in 490 after he killed a number of his advisors.)

In 492, Xiao Ni died and was buried with great honors. In words that he left his five sons, he stated:

As for ability, some are capable and some are less capable. As for official posts, some are fortunate to be promoted while some are blocked. As for fortune, some are rich and some are poor. These are all natural phenomena, and you should not use your position to bully others.

The high praise that Xiao Ni received in official histories might be related to the fact that his fifth son Xiao Zixian (蕭子顯) was the official who was later, in the succeeding Liang Dynasty, commissioned to author the official history of Southern Qi, the Book of Qi.
