= Xiao Zhaowen =

Xiao Zhaowen 蕭昭文

Emperor of Southern Qi
- Reign: 10 September - 5 December 494
- Predecessor: Xiao Zhaoye
- Successor: Emperor Ming
- Born: 480
- Died: 494 (aged 13–14)
- Consorts: Wang Shaoming of Langya
Full name
- Family name: Xiāo (蕭); Given name: Zhāowén (昭文)
Era name and dates
- Yánxīng (延興): 494
Posthumous name
- Prince Gōng (恭王, lit. "respectful")
- Father: Xiao Zhangmao
- Mother: Lady Xu

Xiao Zhaowen (蕭昭文) (480 – c.December 494), formally Prince Gong of Hailing (海陵恭王), courtesy name Jishang (季尚), was an emperor of the Chinese Southern Qi dynasty. He is known as the Prince of Hailing because that was the title he was demoted to after he was deposed by his granduncle Xiao Luan in December 494. (Xiao Luan had made him emperor earlier in September 494 after assassinating his half-brother Xiao Zhaoye.) After Xiao Luan deposed him and assumed the throne himself, he had Xiao Zhaowen poisoned.

== Background ==
Xiao Zhaowen was born in 480, as the second son of the then-Southern Qi Price of Nan Commandery Xiao Zhangmao, the oldest son of the crown prince Xiao Ze. His mother was Xiao Zhangmao's concubine Lady Xu. Little is known about his childhood. After the death of his great-grandfather Emperor Gao in 482, his grandfather Xiao Ze became emperor (as Emperor Wu), and his father Xiao Zhangmao became Crown Prince. In 486, at age six, Xiao Zhaowen was created the Duke of Linru. In 490, he married Wang Shaoming, the daughter of the official Wang Ci (王慈), as his duchess. Early in 493, his father Xiao Zhangmao died, and his older brother Xiao Zhaoye became Crown Prince. Several months later, still in 493, Emperor Wu died as well, and Xiao Zhaoye became emperor. Xiao Zhaoye created Xiao Zhaowen the Prince of Xin'an.

Xiao Zhaoye was a frivolous and wasteful ruler, spending much time in feast and games. In fall 494, the prime minister Xiao Luan the Marquess of Xichang, cousin of Emperor Wu, seeing Xiao Zhaoye as an incompetent ruler and believing that Xiao Zhaoye was going to act against him, carried out a coup and assassinated Xiao Zhaoye. He placed Xiao Zhaowen on the throne to succeed Xiao Zhaoye.

== Reign ==
While Xiao Zhaowen, now 14, carried the title of emperor, actual authority was in the hands of Xiao Luan, and Xiao Luan had himself initially created the Duke of Xuancheng, and then the Prince of Xuancheng. In Xiao Zhaowen's name, Xiao Luan soon carried out the executions of a large number of princes who were sons of Emperors Gao and Wu, whom he viewed as threats against himself:

- Xiao Qiang (蕭鏘), the Prince of Poyang, son of Emperor Gao
- Xiao Zilong (蕭子隆), the Prince of Sui, son of Emperor Wu
- Xiao Zimao (蕭子懋), the Prince of Jin'an, son of Emperor Wu
- Xiao Zijing (蕭子敬), the Prince of Anlu, son of Emperor Wu
- Xiao Rui (蕭銳), the Prince of Nanping, son of Emperor Gao
- Xiao Qiu (蕭銶), the Prince of Jinxi, son of Emperor Gao
- Xiao Keng (蕭鏗), the Prince of Yidu, son of Emperor Gao
- Xiao Shuo (蕭鑠), the Prince of Guiyang, son of Emperor Gao
- Xiao Jun (蕭鈞), the Prince of Hengyang, son of Emperor Gao
- Xiao Feng (蕭鋒), the Prince of Jiangxia, son of Emperor Gao
- Xiao Zizhen (蕭子真), the Prince of Jian'an, son of Emperor Wu
- Xiao Zilun (蕭子倫), the Prince of Baling, son of Emperor Wu
- Xiao Ziqing (蕭子卿), the Prince of Luling, son of Emperor Wu

Initially, Xiao Zhaowen's younger brother Xiao Zhaoxiu (蕭昭秀), the Prince of Linhai, was to be killed as well, but was spared at the last minute. In place of these imperial princes from Emperors Gao and Wu's lines, Xiao Luan, because his own sons were young, installed his nephews Xiao Yaoguang (蕭遙光), Xiao Yaoxin (蕭遙欣), and Xiao Yaochang (蕭遙昌) in important posts. Less than three months after Xiao Zhaowen became emperor, Xiao Luan issued an edict in the name of Xiao Zhangmao's wife Empress Dowager Wang Baoming, stating that Xiao Zhaowen was not sufficiently intelligent and healthy to be emperor, giving the throne to Xiao Luan, who then took the throne as Emperor Ming.

== After reign ==
The edict deposing Xiao Zhaowen created him the title of the Prince of Hailing. About a month after he was removed from the throne, however, Xiao Luan, on pretenses that Xiao Zhaowen was ill, sent imperial physicians to see him, but instead instructed the physicians to have him poisoned. Xiao Zhaowen was given the posthumous name Gong (恭, meaning "respectful") and buried with great honors, but not imperial honors.

== Consorts ==
- Princess consort, of the Wang clan of Langya (王妃 琊瑯王氏), personal name Shaoming (韶明)

Regnal titles
Preceded by Xiao Zhaoye (Prince of Yulin)	Emperor of Southern Qi; 494	Succeeded by Emperor Ming of Southern Qi
