= Emperor Wu of Southern Qi =

Emperor Wu of Southern Qi 南齊武帝

Emperor of Southern Qi
- Reign: 11 April 482 – 27 Aug 493
- Predecessor: Emperor Gao
- Successor: Xiao Zhaoye
- Born: Xiao Long'er (蕭龍兒); 440
- Died: August 27, 493 (aged 52–53)
- Burial: Jing'an Mausoleum (景安陵, in present-day Danyang, Jiangsu)
- Empress: Empress Wumu
Full name
- Family name: Xiāo (蕭); Given name: Zé (賾)
Era name and dates
- Yǒngmíng (永明): 25 January 483-493
Posthumous name
- Emperor Wǔ (武皇帝, lit. "martial")
Temple name
- Shìzǔ (世祖)
- Dynasty: Southern Qi
- Father: Emperor Gao
- Mother: Liu Zhirong

Emperor Wu of Southern Qi (南齊武帝) (440– 27 August 493), personal name Xiao Ze (蕭賾), courtesy name Xuanyuan (宣遠), childhood name Long'er (龍兒), was the second emperor of the Chinese Southern Qi dynasty. He is generally considered to be an able and diligent emperor, although he is also criticized for leading a lavish lifestyle.

== Background ==
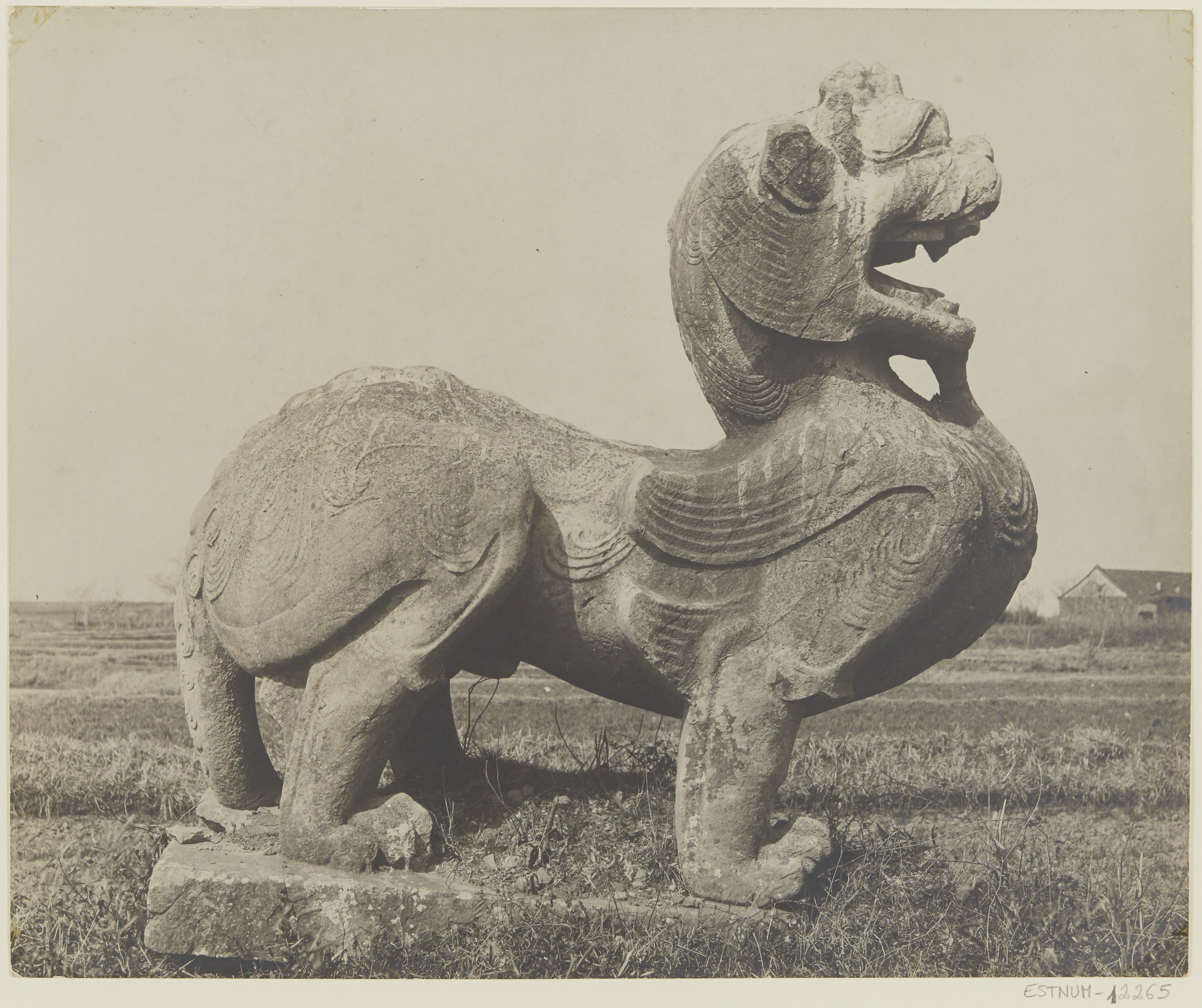
A winged lion from the mausoleum of Qi Wudi near Nanjing

Xiao Ze was born in the Liu Song capital Jiankang in 440, when his father Xiao Daocheng was just 13 years old. He was the oldest son of his father, and his mother Liu Zhirong was Xiao Daocheng's wife.

By 466, when Xiao Daocheng was a Liu Song general, Xiao Ze was a county magistrate at Gan County (贛縣, in modern Ganzhou, Jiangsi), when he was stuck in the civil war between Emperor Ming, whose claim his father Xiao Daocheng supported, and Emperor Ming's nephew Liu Zixun, who also claimed the throne. Because of Xiao Daocheng's support for Emperor Ming, Xiao Ze, who was deep in the territory controlled by Liu Zixun, was arrested and imprisoned. His associate Huan Kang (桓康) fled with Xiao Ze's wife Pei Huizhao and his two sons Xiao Zhangmao and Xiao Ziliang (蕭子良), and then organized some 100 people, along with Xiao Ze's distant relative Xiao Xinzu (蕭欣祖), to make a surprise attack on Gan and rescue Xiao Ze. Xiao Ze then started an uprising at Gan against Liu Zixun. After Liu Zixun was defeated later that year, for Xiao Ze's contributions, Emperor Ming created him the Viscount of Gan, but he declined.

In 477, after Xiao Daocheng assassinated Emperor Ming's violent and arbitrary son and successor Emperor Houfei, the general Shen Youzhi, from his base of Jing Province (荊州, modern central and western Hubei), started a campaign against Xiao Daocheng. At that time, Xiao Ze, who had just previously been the chief of staff for Emperor Houfei's brother Liu Xie (劉燮) the governor of Ying Province (郢州, modern eastern Hubei), was returning to Jiankang with Liu Xie. He had reached Xunyang (尋陽, in modern Jiujiang, Jiangxi) when news of Shen's uprising arrived. His associates all recommending speeding back to the capital Jiankang, but Xiao Ze instead took up defense position at Pencou (湓口, also in modern Jiujiang) to block the Yangtze River in anticipation of Shen's advancing east. When Xiao Daocheng received Xiao Ze's report, he gladly stated, "He is really my son!" (As it turned out, the defense was not needed, as Shen became mired in his siege of Yingcheng (郢城, in modern Wuhan, Hubei), and eventually his forces collapsed when he could not capture Yingcheng quickly, but Xiao Ze's tactical setup would have provided additional difficulty for Shen had he advanced further.) Xiao Ze was subsequently created the Marquess of Wenxi, and then the Duke of Wenxi, as his father progressed toward taking the throne. In 479, after Xiao Daocheng took the throne from Emperor Shun, ending Liu Song and establishing Southern Qi as its Emperor Gao, Xiao Ze was created the crown prince.

== As crown prince ==
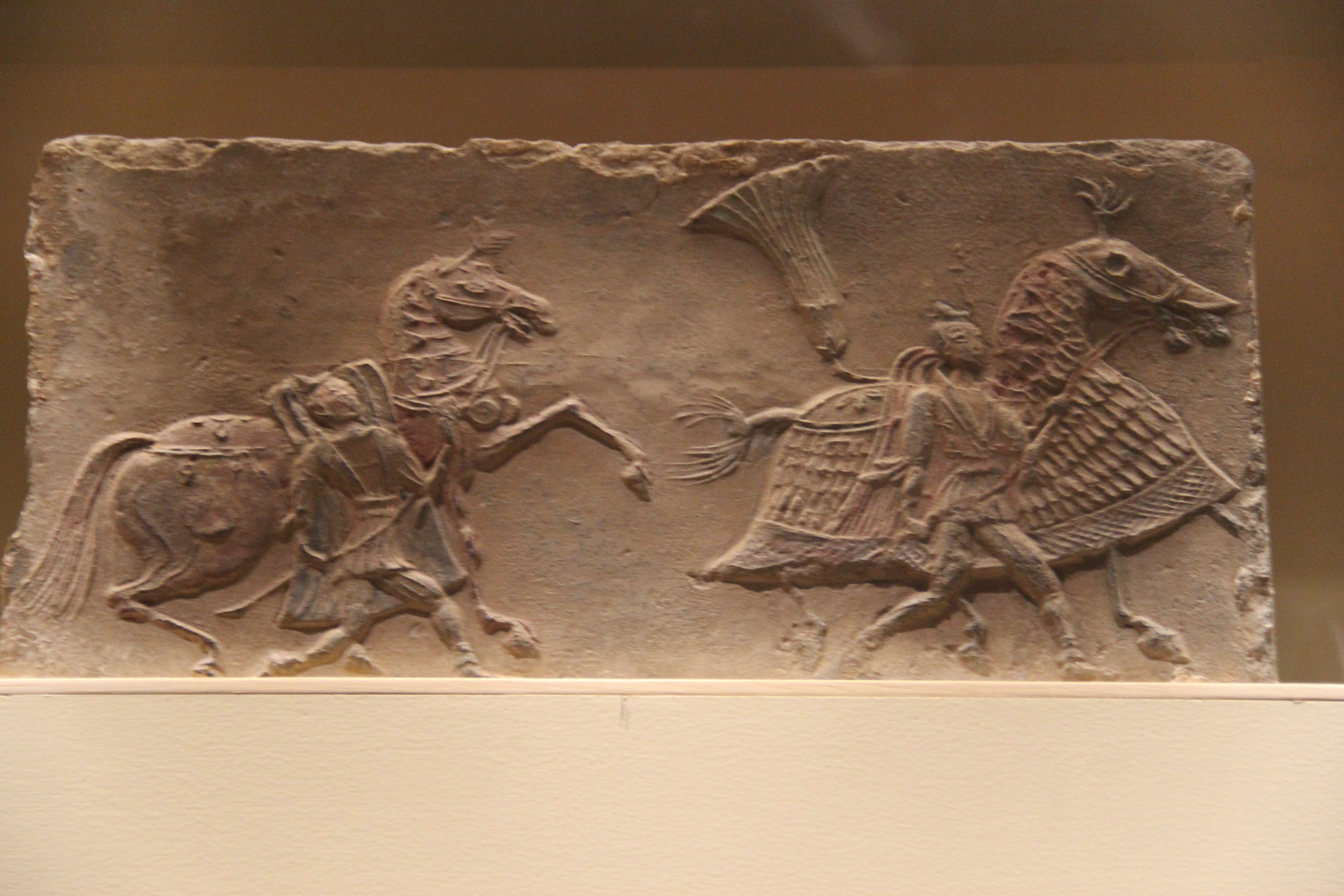
Brick relief of armoured cavalry, Southern Qi

As crown prince, Xiao Ze was often involved in the important matters of state. In 479, for example, when the official Xie Duo (謝胐) publicly displayed refusal to submit to Emperor Gao after he took the throne, Xiao Ze suggested that Emperor Gao execute Xie to warn others, but Emperor Gao refused, instead finding another excuse to remove Xie.

In 480, Xiao Ze's wife, Crown Princess Pei Huizhao, died. He would not have a wife after that point, although he had a multitude of concubines.

Because Xiao Ze was only 13 years younger than his father Emperor Gao, and he felt that he contributed greatly to the establishment of Southern Qi, he often interjected himself into governmental matters, and he often used items that were properly only usable by the emperor. He also trusted his jester Zhang Jingzhen (張景真), who was so luxurious in his lifestyle to be like an emperor. When the official Xun Boyu (荀伯玉) reported this to Emperor Gao while Xiao Ze happened to be away from the capital Jiankang to worship the ancestors, Emperor Gao was enraged. Xiao Ze's brother Xiao Ni the Prince of Yuzhang found this out and quickly rode on a horse to personally warn Xiao Ze. Xiao Ze quickly returned to Jiankang, and the next day, Emperor Gao sent Xiao Ze's two sons, Xiao Zhangmao the Prince of Nan Commandery and Xiao Ziliang the Duke of Wenxi, to rebuke Xiao Ze for him and to order Zhang put to death in Xiao Ze's name. It took about a month for Emperor Gao's furor to subside, after a feast organized by the official Wang Jingze (王敬則) at the crown prince's palace. For some time, however, Emperor Gao considered replacing Xiao Ze as crown prince with Xiao Ni, but because Xiao Ni continued to serve his brother faithfully and carefully, their brotherly relations were not affected.

In 482, Emperor Gao died, and Xiao Ze took the throne as Emperor Wu.

== Early reign ==
Immediately after taking the throne, Emperor Wu posthumously honored his wife Crown Princess Pei as Empress Mu, and he created his oldest son (by her) Xiao Zhangmao crown prince. He also allowed a number of late-Liu Song officials who had opposed or been opposed by Emperor Gao, including Shen Youzhi, Yuan Can, Liu Bing, and Liu Jingsu (劉景素), to be reburied with proper honors, reasoning that they were faithful officials who deserved recognition. He largely handed important governmental matters himself, while having Wang Jian, Wang Yan (王晏), his brother Xiao Ni, and his son Xiao Ziliang as the key advisors. However, his associates Lü Wendu (呂文度), Ru Faliang (茹法亮), and Lü Wenxian (呂文顯) were also powerful behind the scenes.

In 483, in what is considered a major blot on his record, Emperor Wu, still resentful that Xun Boyu had informed Emperor Gao of his misbehavior, had Xun and the general Yuan Chongzu (垣崇祖), whom he suspected of the same and who was a friend of Xun's, put to death under false accusations of treason. He also put to death the ambitious general Zhang Jing'er (張敬兒) and the official Xie Chaozong (謝超宗).

In 485, displeased that Li Shuxian (李叔獻) the governor of Jiao Province (交州, modern northern Vietnam) had been nominally submissive but had actually acted independently, Emperor Wu sent the general Liu Kai (劉楷) to attack Li. Li, in fear, fled back to Jiankang in submission. Later that year, Emperor Wu reestablished the national university and merged the imperial research facility Zongmingguan (總明觀) into it, having Wang Jian as its head.

In late 485, with the people fearful that Emperor Wu was using a new census bureau to discover cases of tax fraud and prosecute them, Tang Yuzhi (唐宇之) rose in Fuyang and captured a number of commanderies, claiming imperial title in spring 486. His rebellion was, however, soon suppressed.

In 487, the migrant Huan Tiansheng (桓天生), who claimed to be a descendant of Huan Xuan, rose in Nanyang, with aid from Northern Wei. However, after several months, he was defeated.

== Late reign ==
In 490, in response to peace overtures that Emperor Xiaowen of Northern Wei made, Emperor Wu made peace with Northern Wei.

In fall 490, Emperor Wu's son Xiao Zixiang (蕭子響) the Prince of Badong and governor of Jing Province, who had been interested in military matters, was accused of making improper trades of weapon with barbarian tribes. His staff members secretly informed Emperor Wu of this, and when Xiao Zixiang learned of this, he killed the staff members who reported on him. In response, Emperor Wu sent a small detachment of soldiers under the command of general Hu Xiezhi (胡諧之), to force Xiao Zixiang to give up his post and return to Jiankang to receive punishment. Hu, however, mishandled the situation as he refused all attempts by Xiao Zixiang to surrender, forcing Xiao Zixiang to engage him in battle and defeat him. Xiao Zixiang subsequently tried to head to Jiankang alone to confess his guilt, but on the way, he was intercepted by the general Xiao Shunzhi (蕭順之), whom Crown Prince Zhangmao, who was fearful of Xiao Zixiang, had secretly instructed to find someway to have Xiao Zixiang killed, and Xiao Shunzhi strangled Xiao Zixiang to death. Emperor Wu, while mourning Xiao Zixiang, publicly declared his guilt and posthumously demoted him to marquess.

In 491, in contravention with the traditional Confucian ceremonies of ancestral worship, Emperor Wu ordered that his parents (Emperor Gao and his wife Liu Zhirong) and grandparents (Emperor Gao's father Xiao Chengzhi (蕭承之) and mother Chen Daozhi (陳道止) make offerings, for sacrificial purposes, items that they favored as foods, rather than the Confucian requirement of sacrificing one pig, one cow, and one goat each. The items offered those ancestors, instead, were:

- Emperor Gao: ground pork sauce, pickled vegetable soup
- Liu Zhirong: green tea, fried dough strips, grilled fish
- Xiao Chengzhi: leavened bread, duck porridge
- Chen Daozhi: young bamboo shoots, duck eggs

Emperor Wu was heavily criticized by Confucian scholars for disobeying tradition (particularly because he also commissioned his sister-in-law, Xiao Ni's wife Princess Yu, to be in charge of the ancestral worship), but this act appeared to show quite a bit of humanity in his relationship with his parents and grandparents.

Also in 491, a project that Emperor Wu commissioned in 489—the revision of the penal statutes to eliminate contradictory provisions in the statutes written by the Jin officials Zhang Fei (張斐) and Du Yu—was completed, which greatly eliminated arbitrary and unfair enforcement of the laws. However, while Emperor Wu also ordered that the national university add a department for legal studies to eliminate the issue where officials were not familiar with penal laws, the order was not actually carried out.

In 493, Crown Prince Zhangmao, to whom Emperor Wu had delegated part of imperial authority late in his reign, died. Emperor Wu created Crown Prince Zhangmao's son, Xiao Zhaoye the Prince of Nan Commandery, as crown prince to replace his father. Later that year, he died, and while there was initially an attempt by the official Wang Rong (王融) to have Xiao Ziliang made emperor instead, Xiao Zhaoye took the throne to succeed Emperor Wu.

The Liang Dynasty historian Xiao Zixian (Emperor Wu's nephew), in his Book of Qi, had these comments about Emperor Wu:

When Shizu [Emperor Wu's temple name] reigned, he was attentive to the important matters of state, oversaw what was important, was strict and intelligent, and resolute and decisive. He gave his commandery governors and county magistrate long office terms, and if their subordinates violated the law, he would send the imperial swords to the governors or magistrates to have them carry out the capital punishments. Therefore, during his era of Yongming, the people were rich and peaceful, and there was little crime. However, he also favored feasting and gaming, and while he expressed displeasure at luxuries and wastefulness, he could not avoid them himself.

== Family ==
- Empress Wumu, of the Pei clan of Hedong (武穆皇后 河東裴氏; d. 480), personal name Huizhao (惠昭)
  - Xiao Zhangmao, Emperor Wen (文皇帝 蕭長懋; 458–493), first son
  - Xiao Ziliang, Prince Wenxuan of Jingling (竟陵文宣王 蕭子良; 460–494), second son
- Shufei, of the Zhang clan (淑妃 張氏)
  - Xiao Ziqing, Prince of Luling (廬陵王 蕭子卿; 468–494), third son
  - Xiao Zixiang, Marquis of Yufu (魚复侯 蕭子響; 469–490), fourth son
- Shuyuan, of the Ruan clan (淑媛 阮氏; d. 494)
  - Xiao Zimao, Prince of Jin'an (晉安王 蕭子懋; 472–494), seventh son
  - Xiao Zijun, Prince Hengyang (衡陽王 蕭子峻; 485–498), 18th son
- Shuyi, of the Zhou clan (淑儀 周氏)
  - Xiao Zijing, Prince of Anlu (安陸王 蕭子敬; 472–494), fifth son
  - Xiao Zizhen, Prince of Jian'an (建安王 蕭子真; 476–494), ninth son
- Shuyi, of the Wang clan (淑儀 王氏)
  - Xiao Zilong, Prince of Sui (隨王 蕭子隆; 474–494), eighth son
- Shuyi, of the Jiang clan (淑儀 江氏)
  - Xiao Ziyue, Prince of Linhe (臨賀王 蕭子岳; 485–498), 16th son
- Zhaohua, of the Xun clan (昭華 荀氏)
  - Xiao Zilin, Prince of Nankang (南康王 蕭子琳; 485–498), 19th son
- Zhaorong, of the Yu clan (昭容 庾氏)
  - Xiao Ziwen, Prince of Xiyang (西陽王 蕭子文; 485–498), tenth son
- Zhaoyi, of the Xie clan (昭儀 謝氏)
  - Xiao Zizhen, Prince of Shaoling (邵陵王 蕭子貞; 481–495), 14th son
- Jieyu, of the Cai clan (婕妤 蔡氏)
  - Xiao Ziming, Prince of Xiyang (西陽王 蕭子明; 479–495), 17th son
- Jieyu, of the Yan clan (婕妤 顏氏)
  - Xiao Zimin, Prince of Yongyang (永陽王 蕭子珉; 485–498), 20th son
- Ronghua, of the Le clan (容華 樂氏)
  - Xiao Zihan, Prince of Nanhai (南海王 蕭子罕; 479–495), 11th son
- Chonghua, of the Fu clan (充華 傅氏)
  - Xiao Zilun, Prince of Baling (巴陵王 蕭子倫; 479–494), 13th son
- Chonghua, of the He clan (充華 何氏)
  - Xiao Zixia, Prince of Nan (南王 蕭子夏; 492–498), 23rd son
- Lady, of the Xie clan (宮人 謝氏)
  - Xiao Zijian, Prince of Xiangdong (湘東王 蕭子建; 486–498), 21st son
- Unknown
  - Princess Wu (吳公主), first daughter
    - Married Wang Guan of Langya (琊瑯 王觀)
  - Princess Changcheng (長城公主), second daughter
    - Married He Jingrong of Lujiang (廬江 何敬容; d. 549)
  - Princess Wukang (武康公主), third daughter
    - Married Xu Yan of Donghai (東海 徐演; d. 499)

== See also ==
- Yongming poetry

Regnal titles
Preceded by Emperor Gao of Southern Qi	Emperor of Southern Qi; 482–493	Succeeded by Xiao Zhaoye (Prince of Yulin)
