= Southern Qi =

Chinese ruling dynasty from 479 to 502

Qi 齊
- 479–502 AD
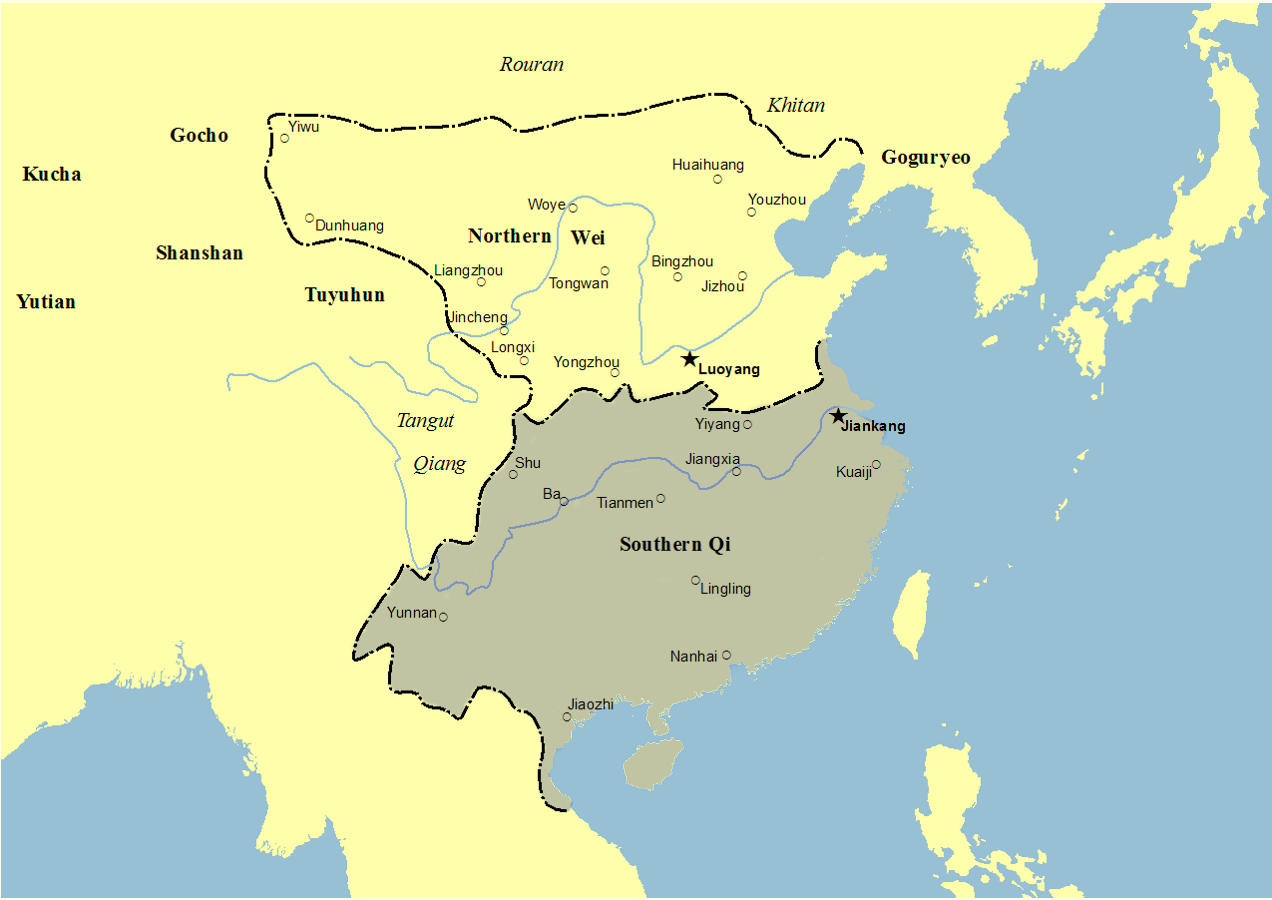
- Southern Qi and its neighbors. They were bordered by the Northern Wei to the north.
- Capital: Jiankang
- Government: Monarchy
- Emperor
  - 479–482: Emperor Gao
  - 482–493: Emperor Wu
  - 501–502: Emperor He
- History
  - Established: 3 June 479
  - Disestablished: 24 April 502 AD
- Currency: Chinese coin, Chinese cash
Preceded by	Succeeded by
Liu Song dynasty	Liang dynasty
- Today part of: China; Vietnam

Qi, known in historiography as the Southern Qi (traditional Chinese: 南齊; simplified Chinese: 南齐; pinyin: Nán Qí or 南朝齊; 南朝齐; Nán Cháo Qí) or Xiao Qi (蕭齊; 萧齐; Xiāo Qí), was a Chinese imperial dynasty and the second of the four Southern dynasties during the Northern and Southern dynasties era. It followed the Liu Song dynasty and was succeeded by the Liang dynasty. The main polity to its north was the Northern Wei.

== History ==
The dynasty began in 479, when Xiao Daocheng forced the Emperor Shun of Liu Song into yielding the throne to him, ending Liu Song and starting Southern Qi, as its Emperor Gao. The dynasty's name was taken from Xiao's fief, which roughly occupied the same territory as the Warring States era Kingdom of Qi. The Book of the Qi does not mention whether or not Xiao had any blood relationship to either the House of Jiang or House of Tian, the two dynasties which had previously ruled that kingdom.

During its 23-year history, the dynasty was largely filled with instability, as after the death of the capable Emperor Gao and Emperor Wu, Emperor Wu's grandson Xiao Zhaoye was assassinated by Emperor Wu's intelligent but cruel and suspicious cousin Xiao Luan, who took over as Emperor Ming, and proceeded to carry out massive executions of Emperor Gao's and Emperor Wu's sons, as well as officials whom he suspected of plotting against him.

The arbitrariness of these executions was exacerbated after Emperor Ming was succeeded by his son Xiao Baojuan, whose actions drew multiple rebellions, the last of which, by the general Xiao Yan led to Southern Qi's fall and succession by Xiao Yan's Liang Dynasty.

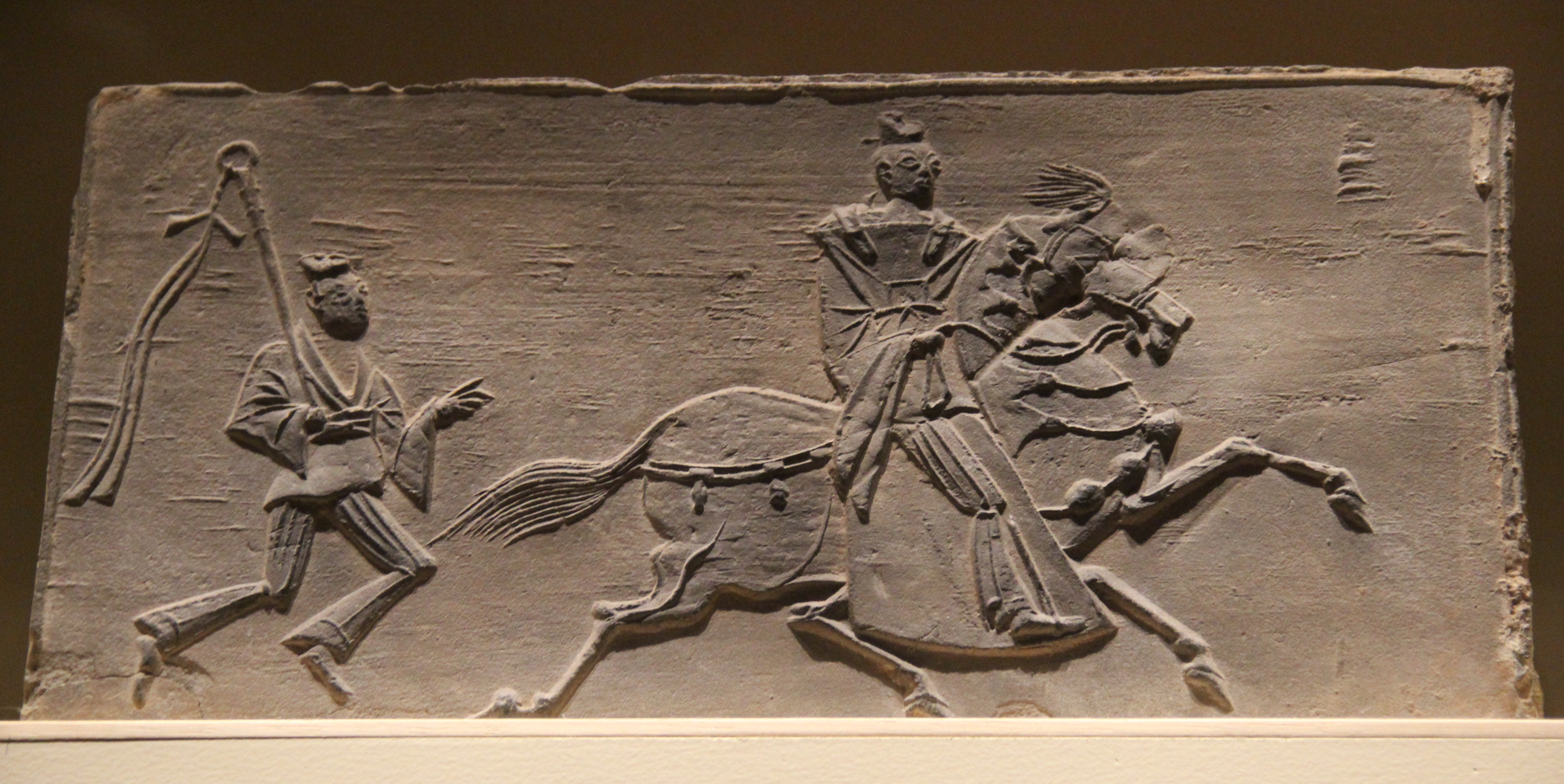
Brick relief from the Dengxian tomb, Dengxian, Henan. Southern Dynasties, c. 500 CE.

More than fifty percent of Tuoba Xianbei princesses of the Northern Wei were married to southern Han Chinese men from the imperial families and aristocrats from southern China of the Southern dynasties who defected and moved north to join the Northern Wei. Tuoba Xianbei Princess Nanyang (南陽長公主) was married to Xiao Baoyin, a Han Chinese member of Southern Qi royalty. Xianbei Tuoba Emperor Xiaozhuang of Northern Wei's sister the Shouyang Princess was wedded to the Han Chinese Liang dynasty ruler Emperor Wu of Liang's son Xiao Zong.

== War with Northern Wei ==
In 479, after Xiao Daocheng usurped the throne of Liu Song, the Northern Wei emperor prepared to invade under the pretext of installing Liu Chang, son of Emperor Wen of Liu Song who had been in exile in Wei since 465 AD. Wei troops began to attack Shouyang but could not take the city. The Southern Qi began to fortify their capital, Jiankang, in order to prevent further Wei raids. Multiple sieges and skirmishes were fought until 481 but the war did not witness any major campaign. A peace treaty was signed in 490 with the Emperor Wu.

== Sovereigns of Southern Qi Dynasty (479–502) ==
Posthumous Name	Family name and given names	Period of Reigns	Era names
Emperor Gao of Southern Qi (齊高帝)	Xiao Daocheng (蕭道成)	479–482	Jianyuan (建元) 479–482
Emperor Wu of Southern Qi (齊武帝)	Xiao Ze (蕭賾)	482–493	Yongming (永明) 483–493
–	Xiao Zhaoye (蕭昭業)	493–494	Longchang (隆昌) 494
–	Xiao Zhaowen (蕭昭文)	494	Yanxing (延興) 494
Emperor Ming of Southern Qi (齊明帝)	Xiao Luan (蕭鸞)	494–498	Jianwu (建武) 494–498; Yongtai (永泰) 498
–	Xiao Baojuan (蕭寶卷)	499–501	Yongyuan (永元) 499–501
Emperor He of Southern Qi (齊和帝)	Xiao Baorong (蕭寶融)	501–502 (Note: Emperor Ming's son Xiao Baoyin, who was then a Northern Wei general, rebelled against Northern Wei and claimed imperial title in 527–528, but is not listed because his claim of imperial title was temporary, long after Emperor He's reign, and also did not include any territory that was previously Southern Qi territory.)	Zhongxing (中興) 501–502

== Sovereigns' family tree ==
Southern Qi

Xiao Chengzhi 萧承之; 384–447
Xiao Daosheng 萧道生	Xiao Daocheng 蕭道成; 427–482; Gao r. 479–482
Xiao Luan 蕭鸞; 452–498; Ming r. 494–498	Xiao Ni 蕭嶷; 444–492; Wenxian of Yuzhang	Xiao Ze 蕭賾; 440–493; Wu r. 482–493
Xiao Baojuan 蕭寶卷; 483–501; r. 498–501	Xiao Baoyin 蕭寶寅; 487–530; r. 527	Xiao Baorong 蕭寶融; 488–502; He r. 501–502	Xiao Zhangmao 蕭長懋; 458–493; Wen 文皇帝
Xiao Zhaoye 蕭昭業; 473–494; r. 493–494	Xiao Zhaowen 蕭昭文; 480–494; r. 494

== Notes ==
The Southern Qi and contemporary continental Asian polities c. 500 CE.

== See also ==
- Southern and Northern Dynasty
- Chinese sovereign
- Yongming poetry
- List of Bronze Age States
- List of Classical Age States
- List of Iron Age States
- List of pre-modern great powers
