= 466 =

466 in various calendars
- Gregorian calendar: 466; CDLXVI
- Ab urbe condita: 1219
- Assyrian calendar: 5216
- Balinese saka calendar: 387–388
- Bengali calendar: −128 – −127
- Berber calendar: 1416
- Buddhist calendar: 1010
- Burmese calendar: −172
- Byzantine calendar: 5974–5975
- Chinese calendar: 乙巳年 (Wood Snake); 3163 or 2956 — to — 丙午年 (Fire Horse); 3164 or 2957
- Coptic calendar: 182–183
- Discordian calendar: 1632
- Ethiopian calendar: 458–459
- Hebrew calendar: 4226–4227
- Hindu calendars
- Vikram Samvat: 522–523
- Shaka Samvat: 387–388
- Kali Yuga: 3566–3567
- Holocene calendar: 10466
- Iranian calendar: 156 BP – 155 BP
- Islamic calendar: 161 BH – 160 BH
- Javanese calendar: 351–352
- Julian calendar: 466; CDLXVI
- Korean calendar: 2799
- Minguo calendar: 1446 before ROC 民前1446年
- Nanakshahi calendar: −1002
- Seleucid era: 777/778 AG
- Thai solar calendar: 1008–1009
- Tibetan calendar: ཤིང་མོ་སྦྲུལ་ལོ་ (female Wood-Snake); 592 or 211 or −561 — to — མེ་ཕོ་རྟ་ལོ་ (male Fire-Horse); 593 or 212 or −560

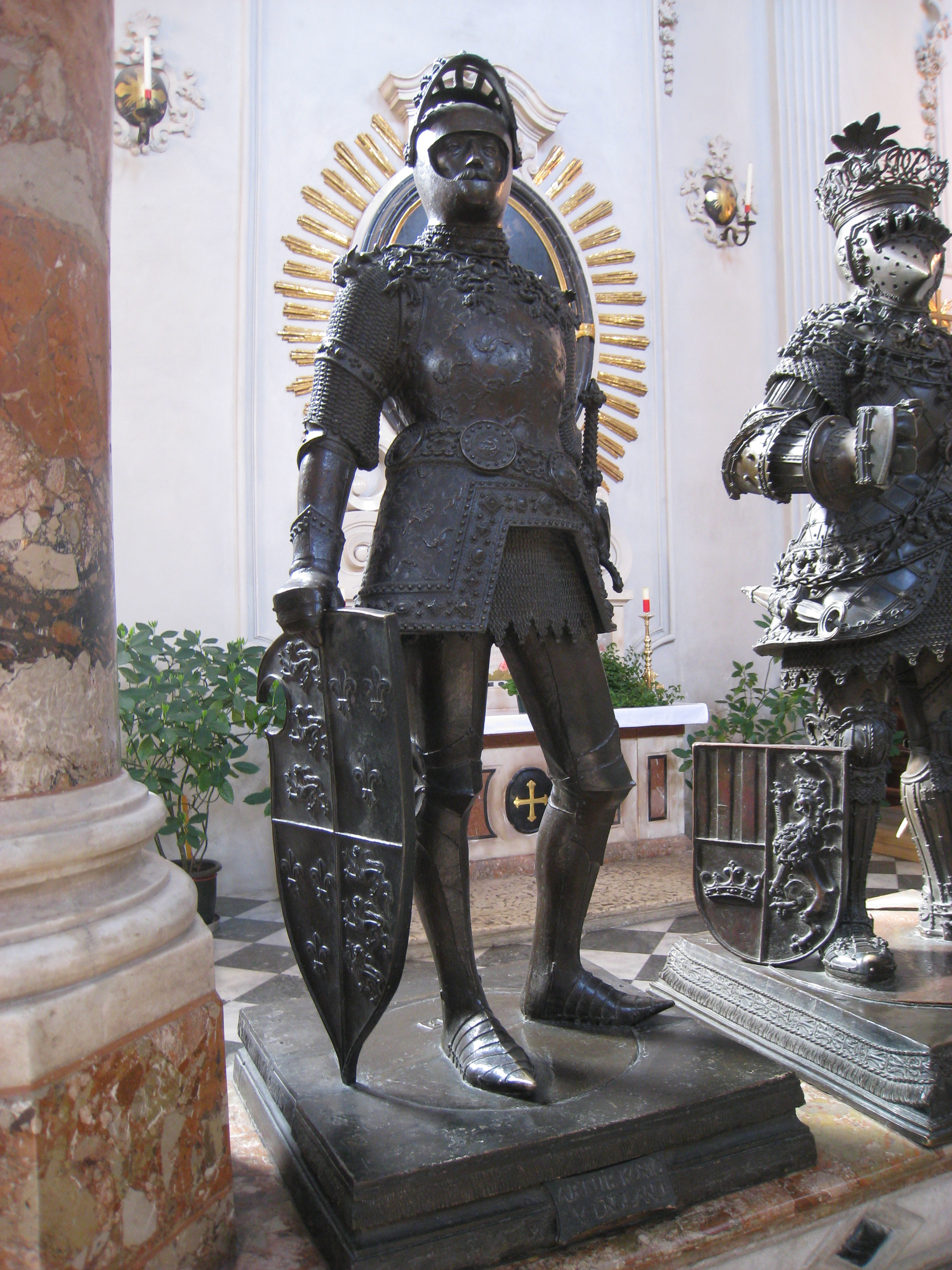
Statue of King Arthur (Innsbruck), who might have been born c. 466.

Year 466 (CDLXVI) was a common year starting on Saturday of the Julian calendar. At the time, it was known as the Year of the Consulship of Leo and Tatianus (or, less frequently, year 1219 Ab urbe condita). The denomination 466 for this year has been used since the early medieval period, when the Anno Domini calendar era became the prevalent method in Europe for naming years.

== Events ==
=== By place ===
==== Roman Empire ====
- Emperor Leo I repels the Hun invasion of Dacia (modern Romania). They ravage the Balkans but are unable to take Constantinople thanks to the city walls, which are rebuilt and reinforced.
- Tarasicodissa, an Isaurian officer, comes with evidence that Ardabur (magister militum) is forming a conspiracy against Leo I. Ardabur is arrested for treason.
- Tarasicodissa adopts the Greek name of Zeno and marries Ariadne, eldest daughter of Leo I (approximate date).

==== Europe ====
- King Theodoric II is killed by his younger brother Euric, who succeeds him on the throne. He conquers Hispania and the harbor city of Marseille (Southern Gaul), adding them to the existing Visigothic Kingdom.
- Euric sends an embassy to the Eastern Roman Empire for recognition of the Visigoth sovereignty. He forms an alliance with the Suebi and the Vandals.
- A council of twelve townships emerges on the islands in the Venetian lagoon, to form a basic system of governance (approximate date).

==== Asia ====
- King Mehama of the Alkhans was victorious in a battle against the Kidarites.

=== By topic ===
==== Religion ====
- Peter the Fuller is deposed as patriarch of Antioch; Julian is elected as his successor.

== Births ==
- Arthur, king of the Britons (approximate date according to legend)
- Clovis I, first king of the Franks (approximate date)
- Xu Mian, high official of the Liang dynasty (d. 535)

== Deaths ==
- January 1 – Emperor Qianfei, emperor of the Liu Song dynasty (b. 449)
- Liu Zixun, prince and pretender of Liu Song (b. 456)
- Lu Huinan, empress dowager of Liu Song (b. 412)
- Theodoret of Cyprus, theologian
- Theodoric II, king of the Visigoths
- Yifu Hun, high official of Northern Wei
