= Wenmu =

Wenmu (Chinese: 文穆; lit. 'civil and solemn') is a Chinese posthumous name. People who have received the name include:

- Cai Mo (281–356), Jin dynasty minister
- He Chong (Jin dynasty) (292–346), Jin dynasty minister
- Wang Xianyuan (427–464), Empress Wenmu of Liu Song
- Yuan Yong (died 578), Prince Wenmu of Gaoyang during the Northern Wei dynasty
- Qian Yuanguan (887–941), King Wenmu of Wuyue
- Wang Qinruo (962–1025), Song dynasty minister

== See also ==
- Emperor Wenmu (disambiguation)
- Empress Wenmu (disambiguation)
