= Empress Lu (Liu Song dynasty) =

Empress Lu (路皇后, personal name unknown) (fl.456 - 466) was an empress of the Chinese Liu Song dynasty. Her husband was Emperor Qianfei.

Her father Lu Daoqing (路道慶) was the younger brother of Emperor Qianfei's grandmother Empress Dowager Lu Huinan, making her generationally her husband's aunt. She was his second wife. Very little is known about her—certainly far less than the historical accounts about Emperor Qianfei's first wife, Crown Princess He Lingwan (何令婉), who died before Emperor Qianfei became emperor, about whom both Song Shu and Nan Shi had much to say. This might be because Crown Princess He was from a noble family, whereas Empress Dowager Lu's lineage was considered lowly. Emperor Qianfei created her empress on 16 December 465, after having become emperor in 464 after his father Emperor Xiaowu's death. It is not known what happened to her after Emperor Qianfei, a violent and impulsive ruler, was assassinated just 16 days after creating her empress, and Emperor Qianfei was buried with Crown Princess He, without provision for Empress Lu to be buried with him in the future.

Chinese royalty
Preceded by Empress Wang Xianyuan	Empress of Liu Song; 16 Dec 465 – 1 Jan 466	Succeeded by Empress Wang Zhenfeng
