= 449 =

449 in various calendars
- Gregorian calendar: 449; CDXLIX
- Ab urbe condita: 1202
- Assyrian calendar: 5199
- Balinese saka calendar: 370–371
- Bengali calendar: −145 – −144
- Berber calendar: 1399
- Buddhist calendar: 993
- Burmese calendar: −189
- Byzantine calendar: 5957–5958
- Chinese calendar: 戊子年 (Earth Rat); 3146 or 2939 — to — 己丑年 (Earth Ox); 3147 or 2940
- Coptic calendar: 165–166
- Discordian calendar: 1615
- Ethiopian calendar: 441–442
- Hebrew calendar: 4209–4210
- Hindu calendars
- Vikram Samvat: 505–506
- Shaka Samvat: 370–371
- Kali Yuga: 3549–3550
- Holocene calendar: 10449
- Iranian calendar: 173 BP – 172 BP
- Islamic calendar: 178 BH – 177 BH
- Javanese calendar: 334–335
- Julian calendar: 449; CDXLIX
- Korean calendar: 2782
- Minguo calendar: 1463 before ROC 民前1463年
- Nanakshahi calendar: −1019
- Seleucid era: 760/761 AG
- Thai solar calendar: 991–992
- Tibetan calendar: ས་ཕོ་བྱི་བ་ལོ་ (male Earth-Rat); 575 or 194 or −578 — to — ས་མོ་གླང་ལོ་ (female Earth-Ox); 576 or 195 or −577

Year 449 (CDXLIX) was a common year starting on Saturday of the Julian calendar. At the time, it was known as the Year of the Consulship of Astyrius and Romanus (or, less frequently, year 1202 Ab urbe condita). The denomination 449 for this year has been used since the early medieval period, when the Anno Domini calendar era became the prevalent method in Europe for naming years.

== Events ==
=== By place ===
==== Europe ====
- Emperor Valentinian III sends an emissary to Attila the Hun. The purpose of the meeting is a long-running dispute over spoils of war during the Danube offensive (441–442). Attila claims his lost property, but Valentinian and Flavius Aetius (magister militum) refuse this request.
- Flavius Orestes, Roman aristocrat, is sent to Attila's court and becomes a high-ranking secretary (notarius). He is the father of the future emperor Romulus Augustulus.
- Traditional date – Hengist and Horsa, by tradition chieftains of the Jutes, land at Isle of Thanet, according to the Anglo-Saxon Chronicle at the invitation of Vortigern. The Britons form a military alliance with them against the Picts and Scoti. Bede considers this the beginning of the Anglo-Saxon settlement of Britain.

=== By topic ===
==== Religion ====
- August 3 – The Second Council of Ephesus opens, chaired by Dioscorus, patriarch of Alexandria. Flavian, patriarch of Constantinople, and Domnus II, patriarch of Antioch, are deposed on August 8.
- October – A Roman synod repudiates all the decisions of the Second Council of Ephesus.
- Anatolius becomes patriarch of Constantinople.
- Maximus II becomes patriarch of Antioch.

== Births ==
- February 25 – Liu Ziye, emperor of the Liu Song dynasty (d. 466)
- Eugendus, abbot of Condat Abbey (approximate date)
- Kavadh I, king of the Persian Empire (d. 531)

== Deaths ==
- August 11 – Flavian, patriarch of Constantinople
- Eucherius, bishop of Lyon (approximate date)
- Hilary, bishop of Arles (b. 403)
