= 412 =

412 in various calendars
- Gregorian calendar: 412; CDXII
- Ab urbe condita: 1165
- Assyrian calendar: 5162
- Balinese saka calendar: 333–334
- Bengali calendar: −182 – −181
- Berber calendar: 1362
- Buddhist calendar: 956
- Burmese calendar: −226
- Byzantine calendar: 5920–5921
- Chinese calendar: 辛亥年 (Metal Pig); 3109 or 2902 — to — 壬子年 (Water Rat); 3110 or 2903
- Coptic calendar: 128–129
- Discordian calendar: 1578
- Ethiopian calendar: 404–405
- Hebrew calendar: 4172–4173
- Hindu calendars
- Vikram Samvat: 468–469
- Shaka Samvat: 333–334
- Kali Yuga: 3512–3513
- Holocene calendar: 10412
- Iranian calendar: 210 BP – 209 BP
- Islamic calendar: 216 BH – 215 BH
- Javanese calendar: 295–296
- Julian calendar: 412; CDXII
- Korean calendar: 2745
- Minguo calendar: 1500 before ROC 民前1500年
- Nanakshahi calendar: −1056
- Seleucid era: 723/724 AG
- Thai solar calendar: 954–955
- Tibetan calendar: ལྕགས་མོ་ཕག་ལོ་ (female Iron-Boar); 538 or 157 or −615 — to — ཆུ་ཕོ་བྱི་བ་ལོ་ (male Water-Rat); 539 or 158 or −614

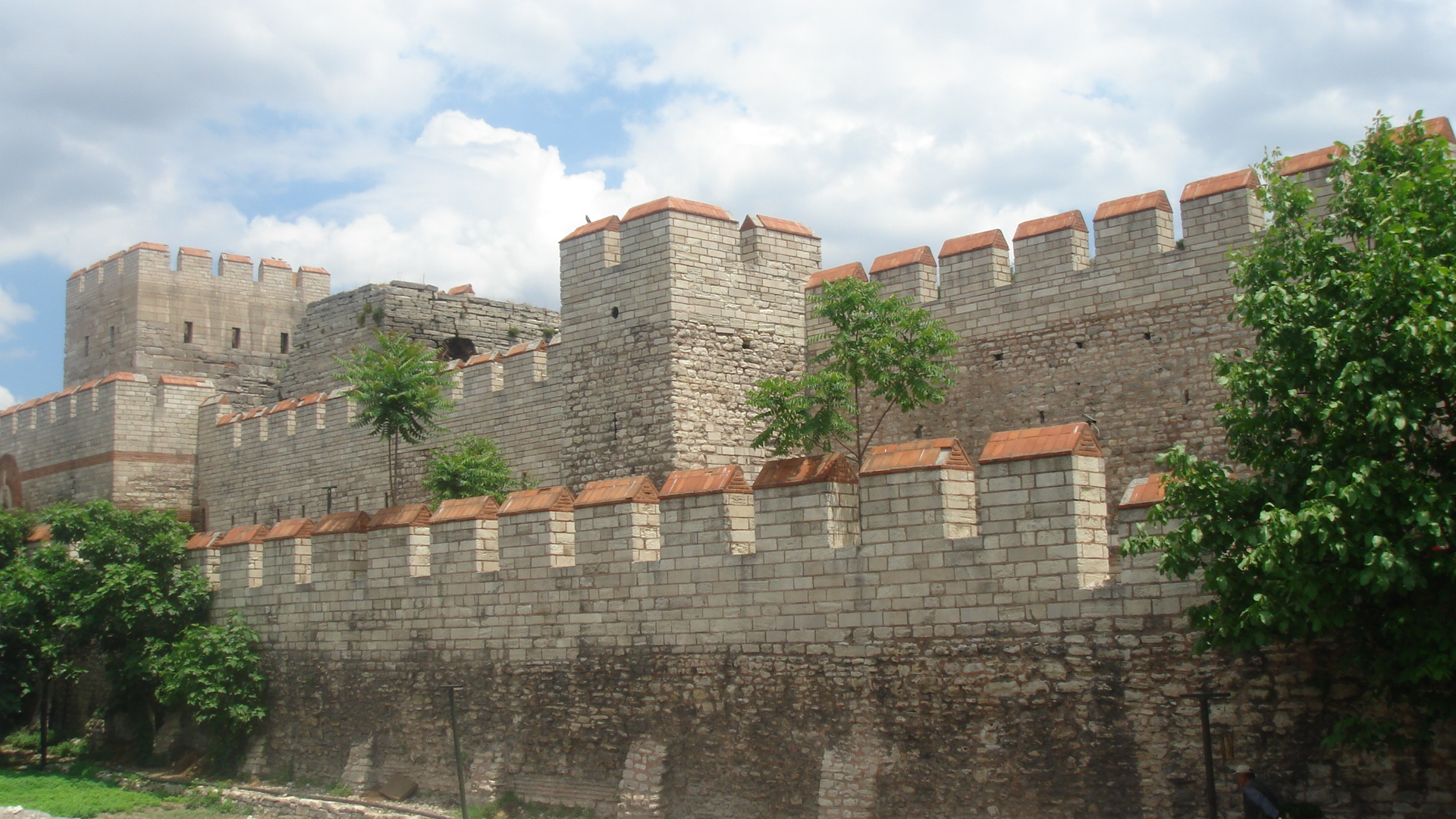
The Theodosian Walls (Constantinople)

Year 412 (CDXII) was a leap year starting on Monday of the Julian calendar. At the time, it was known in Europe as the Year of the Consulship of Honorius and Theodosius (or, less frequently, year 1165 Ab urbe condita). The denomination 412 for this year has been used since the early medieval period, when the Anno Domini calendar era became the prevalent method in Europe for naming years.

== Events ==
=== By place ===
==== Roman Empire ====
- Roman Civil war of 407–415:
  - The Visigoths, led by King Ataulf, move into the south of Gaul. He establishes his residence at Narbonne, and makes an alliance with Emperor Honorius, against the usurper Jovinus.
  - Emperor Jovinus elevates his brother Sebastianus as co-emperor (Augustus) and takes control of Gaul.
  - Heraclianus, governor (Comes Africae), revolts against Honorius and proclaims himself Augustus. He interrupts the grain supply to Rome. Honorius condemns him and his supporters to death with an edict at Ravenna.
- The Theodosian Walls are constructed at Constantinople during the reign of emperor Theodosius II. The work is carried out under supervision of Anthemius, notable praetorian prefect of the East.
- Winter – Olympiodorus, historical writer, is sent on an embassy by Honorius, and sails in stormy weather around Greece up the Black Sea, to meet the Huns who are located on the middle Danube (modern Bulgaria).

==== Balkans ====
- The forts on the west bank of the Danube, which were destroyed by the Huns, are rebuilt, and a new Danubian fleet is launched.

=== By topic ===
==== Religion ====
- An edict of Honorius outlaws Donatism.
- Cyril of Alexandria becomes Patriarch of Alexandria.
- Lazarus, bishop of Aix-en-Provence, and Heros, bishop of Arles, are expelled from their sees on a charge of Manichaeism.
- Fa-Hien, Chinese Buddhist monk, spends 2 years in Ceylon and is more than 200 days at sea as storms drive his ship off its course, but returns with sacred Buddhist texts back to China (see 414).

== Births ==
- February 8 – Proclus, Greek Neoplatonist philosopher (d. 485)
- Lu Huinan, empress dowager of the Liu Song dynasty (d. 466)

== Deaths ==
- October 15 – Theophilus, Patriarch of Alexandria
- Gwanggaeto the Great, king of Goguryeo (b. 374)
- Qifu Gangui, prince of the Xianbei state Western Qin
- Sarus, Gothic chieftain
- Uldin, chieftain of the Huns
- Wang Shen'ai, empress of the Jin dynasty (born 384)
