= 456 =

456 in various calendars
- Gregorian calendar: 456; CDLVI
- Ab urbe condita: 1209
- Assyrian calendar: 5206
- Balinese saka calendar: 377–378
- Bengali calendar: −138 – −137
- Berber calendar: 1406
- Buddhist calendar: 1000
- Burmese calendar: −182
- Byzantine calendar: 5964–5965
- Chinese calendar: 乙未年 (Wood Goat); 3153 or 2946 — to — 丙申年 (Fire Monkey); 3154 or 2947
- Coptic calendar: 172–173
- Discordian calendar: 1622
- Ethiopian calendar: 448–449
- Hebrew calendar: 4216–4217
- Hindu calendars
- Vikram Samvat: 512–513
- Shaka Samvat: 377–378
- Kali Yuga: 3556–3557
- Holocene calendar: 10456
- Iranian calendar: 166 BP – 165 BP
- Islamic calendar: 171 BH – 170 BH
- Javanese calendar: 341–342
- Julian calendar: 456; CDLVI
- Korean calendar: 2789
- Minguo calendar: 1456 before ROC 民前1456年
- Nanakshahi calendar: −1012
- Seleucid era: 767/768 AG
- Thai solar calendar: 998–999
- Tibetan calendar: ཤིང་མོ་ལུག་ལོ་ (female Wood-Sheep); 582 or 201 or −571 — to — མེ་ཕོ་སྤྲེ་ལོ་ (male Fire-Monkey); 583 or 202 or −570

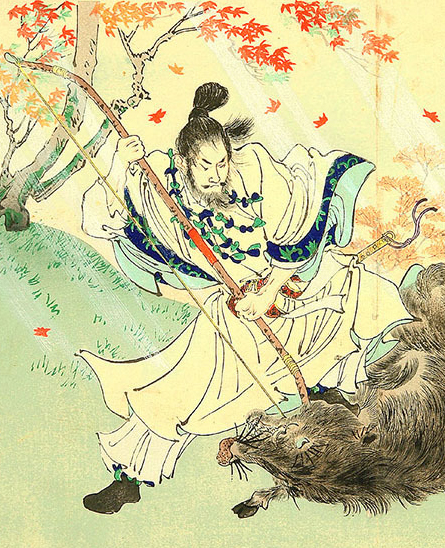
Emperor Yūryaku (456–479)

Year 456 (CDLVI) was a leap year starting on Sunday of the Julian calendar. At the time, it was known as the Year of the Consulship of Avitus without colleague (or, less frequently, year 1209 Ab urbe condita). The denomination 456 for this year has been used since the early medieval period, when the Anno Domini calendar era became the prevalent method in Europe for naming years.

== Events ==
=== By place ===
==== Roman Empire ====
- March – Emperor Marcian sends an embassy to Carthage, to end the Vandal raids in the Mediterranean from their strongholds in North Africa, and quells disturbances on the Armenian frontier.
- Emperor Avitus sends a Germanic naval expedition under command of Ricimer, to defend Sicily. They defeat the Vandals twice: on land at the Battle of Agrigentum, and in a sea battle off Corsica.
- Summer – Capua is destroyed by the Vandals. Ricimer is unable to end piracy in the western Mediterranean. Backed by his popularity, he gains the consent of the Senate for an expedition against Avitus.
- September 17 – Remistus, Roman general (magister militum), is besieged with a Gothic force at Ravenna and later executed in the Palace in Classis, outside the city.
- October 5 – The Visigoths under King Theodoric II, acting on orders of Avitus, invade Spain with an army of Burgundians, Franks and Goths, led by their kings Chilperic I and Gondioc. They defeat the Suebi under King Rechiar on the Urbicus River, near Astorga (Gallaecia); this shatters the power of the Suebi.
- October 17 – Battle of Placentia: Ricimer, supported by Majorian (comes domesticorum), defeats the usurper Avitus near Piacenza (northern Italy). They compel him to renounce the purple, and Avitus is obliged to become bishop of Piacenza.
- October 28 – The Visigoths brutally sack the Suebi's capital of Braga (modern Portugal); churches are burnt to the ground. Rechiar flees wounded from the battlefield.
- December - Rechiar, first Germanic king to convert to Nicene Christianity, is captured at Oporto and executed.

==== Britannia ====
- Saint Patrick leaves Britain once more to evangelise Ireland as a missionary bishop.
- The Anglo-Saxons call the British nobles to a peace conference at Stonehenge, but turn on them and massacre almost everyone (approximate date).

==== Asia ====
- After a 10-year reign, Emperor Ankō is assassinated by the 10-year-old Mayowa No Ōkimi (Prince Mayowa), in retaliation for the execution of his father. He is succeeded by his brother Yūryaku who becomes the 21st Emperor of Japan.

== Births ==
- Liu Zixun, Prince and Pretender of Liu Song (d. 466)

== Deaths ==
- September 17 – Remistus, Roman general (magister militum)
- Emperor Ankō of Japan (approximate date)
- Eutyches, presbyter and archimandrite (approximate date)
- Rechiar, King of the Suebi (captured and executed)
- Talorc I, King of the Picts (approximate date)
