= Yongguang =

Yongguang (永光) was a Chinese era name used by several emperors of China. It may refer to:

- Yongguang (43BC–39BC), an era name used by Emperor Yuan of Han
- Yongguang (465), an era name used by Liu Ziye, emperor of Liu Song
