= Untouchable Lovers =

Chinese television series

- Drama poster
- Also known as: The Phoenix Prison
- Genre: Historical fiction; Romance
- Based on: Feng Qiu Huang by Tianyi Youfeng
- Written by: Yu Zheng
- Directed by: Li Huizhu; Deng Weien; Huang Bin
- Starring: Guan Xiaotong; Song Weilong
- Country of origin: China
- Original language: Mandarin
- No. of seasons: 1
- No. of episodes: 52

Production
- Producer: Yu Zheng
- Production locations: Hengdian World Studios; Iceland
- Running time: 45 mins
- Production companies: Cathay Media; Huanyu Film

Original release
- Network: Hunan TV
- Release: January 14 – April 16, 2018

Untouchable Lovers (Chinese: 凤囚凰; pinyin: Fèng qiú huáng) is a 2018 Chinese television series based on the novel Feng Qiu Huang (A Tale of Two Phoenixes) by Tianyi Youfeng (天衣有风). The series is produced by Yu Zheng and stars Guan Xiaotong and Song Weilong. It aired on Hunan TV from January 14 to April 16, 2018. Untouchable Lovers has a 3.6 rating on Douban from over 41,000 users.

== Synopsis ==
Tianji Tower, the leading organization of the pugilistic world is determined to overthrow the tyrannical ruler Liu Ziye. To achieve their mission, Tianji Tower replaces the king's sister Liu Chuyu with their own disciple and Princess-lookalike Zhu Que. Zhu Que meets the Princess' learned companion Rong Zhi, who turns out to be a spy from Northern Wei. Liu Chuyu and Rong Zhi's relationship eventually breaks down over misunderstandings and differing loyalties, and the latter fakes his death in order to regain Chuyu's forgiveness.

In an alternate story, Chuyu is sent to marry Northern Wei's Prince regent, Rong Zhi.

== Cast ==
=== Main ===
Actor	Character	Introduction
Guan Xiaotong	Liu Chuyu	Princess Shanyin. Elder sister of Liu Ziye. She is known for her outstanding beauty, as well as her lust for men.
Guan Xiaotong	Zhuque / Liu Chuxiu	An assassin who was trained at Tianji Tower. She takes on the identity of Liu Chuyu in order to assassinate Liu Ziye, but finds out that she is Chuyu's twin sister, who was abandoned since young due to a cursed prophecy.
Song Weilong	Rong Zhi	In the alternate story, he's the younger brother of Feng Ting, Empress Dowager of Northern Wei. A sly and scheming man who uses Chuyu's power to further his own kingdom, but falls in love with her in the end.

=== Supporting ===
==== Liu Song dynasty ====
===== People in Princess Manor =====
Actor	Character	Introduction
Li Zonglin	Hua Cuo	A swordsman who was saved by Rong Zhi, and brought into the Princess Manor. He is loyal toward Rong Zhi, but the latter only uses him to fulfill his goals, thus causing him to eventually turn against Rong Zhi.
Lu Zhuo	Liu Se	Chuyu's male companion. He is good-looking but pales in comparison to others when it comes to talents. Coming from a poor family, he tries hard to win Chuyu's favor so as to allow his family members to rise up in rank.
Hong Yao	Huan Yuan	Chuyu's male companion. He is gentle as jade and talented in poetry. He is the only descendant of the fallen Early Lê dynasty, and was saved by Chuyu and brought to her manor. Despite hating her initially, Huan Yuan later falls in love with Chuyu (Zhuque) and remains loyal to her.
Zhang Chaoren	Yue Jianfei	Chuyu's bodyguard. He is actually a descendant of Mount Yunjin, and is enemies with Hua Cuo due to the history of their respective sects. He later betrays Chuyu under Tian Rujing's instructions, causing a drift in Chuyu and Liu Ziye's relationship.
Jin Haochen; Zhang Mingxuan (young)	Mo Xiang	Chuyu's male companion. He is known for his beauty and unique scent. He is loyal to Rong Zhi, and is mutually in love with Fendai.
Shiyue Anxin	Liu Sang	Youngest male companion of Chuyu.
Zhao Yiqin	Jiang Yan	Chuyu's male companion. He and Huan Yuan planned to rebel against Chuyu, but was discovered by Zhuque and sent out of the palace.
Sun Feifan	Pei Shu	Chuyu's male companion. A man with lofty ambitions.
Gao Yu'er	Fendai	An assassin of Tianji Pavilion. She disguised herself as Chuyu's personal attendant to aid Zhuque in killing Liu Ziye. She is in love with Mo Xiang.
Zhang Zexi	Youlan	Chuyu's personal attendant. She admires Rong Zhi, but the latter only makes use of her.

===== Royal family =====
Actor	Character	Introduction
Meng Qin	Concubine Chen	Concubine of Liu Yilong, Liu Chuyu and Liu Ziye's grandfather.
Yang Mingna	Wang Xianyuan	Empress Dowager. Liu Chuyu and Liu Ziye's birth mother.
Yang Qingqian	Imperial Concubine Yin	Concubine of Liu Jun, Liu Chuyu and Liu Ziye's father. Her son was humiliated by Liu Ziye, and thus she harbored hatred for him. She joined Tianji Tower in order to kill Liu Ziye.
Liu Enxiang	Liu Yu	Prince Xiangdong, Liu Chuyu and Liu Ziye's uncle. He becomes the new Emperor following his nephew's disposal. He is shrewd and cunning, and is more cruel and barbaric than his nephew.
Chen Yalan	Wang Zhenfeng	Liu Yu's wife. She was imprisoned after she drew a drunken fit at her husband's flirtatious behavior with the palace maids.
Shi Jingzhi	Liu Yingmei	Princess Xincha. Liu Song's sister, Liu Chuyu and Liu Ziye's aunt. Due to her beauty, she attracted Liu Ziye's attention and was forced to have sexual relations with him. When she discovers that Liu Ziye had killed her son, she worked with Fendai to kill Liu Ziye.
Wang Yuqi	He Mai	Prince Consort, Liu Yingmei's husband. He was killed after questioning Liu Ziye on his wife's disappearance.
Huang Junbin	Liu Chang	Prince Songming (9th prince). Liu Chuyu and Liu Ziye's uncle. He was suspected by Liu Ziye of treason, and escaped the palace under the help of Tianji Tower.
Li Geyang	Liu Xiu'iu	Prince Jinping (12th prince). Liu Chuyu and Liu Ziye's uncle.
Jiang Peng	Liu Xiuyou	Prince Songzong (13th prince). Liu Chuyu and Liu Ziye's uncle.
Zhang Yijie	Liu Ziye	A tyrant ruler with an explosive temper. He only calms down when he is by Chuyu's side. He was later assassinated by the killers of Tianji Tower.
Guo Ziming	Liu Ziying	Prince Shiping. Son of Liu Yu and Imperial Concubine Yin, Liu Chuyu and Liu Ziye's brother. He was humiliated by Liu Ziye since young.
He Wan	He Ji	Prince Consort, Liu Chuyu's husband. Humiliated by Chuyu's unfaithfulness to their marriage, he harbors hatred for her and secretly plots to kill her.

===== Officials and servants =====
Actor	Character	Introduction
Xiang Hao	Zong Yue	Great general of Liu Song. He was extremely loyal to Liu Ziye, and later serves Liu Yu following Liu Ziye's disposal. He later dies under the hands of Mo Xiang, whose parents were killed by him.
Yang Hongwu	Shen Qingzhi	A government official. Shen Youzhi's uncle.
Li Zhongyu	Shen Youzhi	General of Liu Song. He killed Shen Qingzhi under the manipulations of Mo Xiang.
Geng Shu	Jiang Yanzhi	General of Agile Cavalry, later military advisor. He works for Liu Xiuyou.
Zheng Long	Hua Yuan'er	Liu Ziye's eunuch.

==== Northern Wei ====
===== Royal family =====
Actor	Character	Introduction
Wu Jinyan	Feng Ting	Empress Dowager of Northern Wei. Rong Zhi's sister. A woman in high position with power and authority, she controls the court's affairs.
Lin Jing	Grand Consort Qi	Tuoba Yun's birth mother. She and Feng Ting are rivals.
Shi Yunpeng	Tuoba Hong	Ruler of Northern Wei.
Merxat	Tuoba Yun	Prince Kang of Northern Wei. Rong Zhi's competitor in both power and love.
Bai Lu	Le Yun	Tuoba Yun's concubine. A cunning woman who looks identical to Huo Xuan.
Zhao Lusi	Ma Xueyun	Rong Zhi's concubine. Her relationship with Rong Zhi was a complete lid and facade to deceive Chuyu, causing her to harbor much hatred toward Chuyu.
Zhang Bowen	Tuoba Hong / Yuan Hong	Tuoba Hong's son.
Yu Yao	Tuoba Yu	Tuoba Hong's son. He is greatly doted on by Feng Ting.
Wu Shuang	Yueya	Rong Zhi's concubine, gifted to him by Tuoba Hong.

===== Officials and servants =====
Actor	Character	Introduction
Bai Lu	Huo Xuan	A female general and commander of the Huo army, she's Rong Zhi's close friend and is in love with him. She has an entangling relationship of love and hate with Gu Huan.
Wang Maolei	Ma Zhongliang	Prime Minister of Northern Wei. He uses his daughter, Ma Xueyun, in exchange of wealth and power.
Wang Jianguo	Zhao Qi	Tuoba Hong's trusted minister. He was later harmed to death by Huo Xuan.
Wang Yizhe	Wang Ze	Lieutenant general of Huo Army. Huo Xuan's confidante. He fell in love with Qingyue.
Xu Kai	Shen Yu	Rong Zhi's bodyguard. He and Qingyue are bickering lovers.
Wu Jiayi	Qingyue	A Negrito slave who was saved by Chuyu, and becomes her personal attendant. She and Shen Yu are bickering lovers.
Chen Haoming	Qin Gu	Feng Ting's loyal assistant.
Chenpeng Wanli	Qi Heng	Tuoba Yun's bodyguard and cousin.
Fu Mei	Lanruo	Chuyu's personal attendant.
Xu Li Di Sha	Bixi	Ma Xueyun's personal attendant.
Tianyuan Zuoyang	Yu'er	A maid.

==== Others ====
Actor	Character	Introduction
Zhang Xinyu	Wang Yizhi	Prince of Langya. A man of great reputation.
He Fengtian	Descendant of Mount Yunjin	Yue Jianfei and Tian Rujing's senior uncle. Leader of Tianji Tower, an organization who plots to overthrow Liu Ziye as emperor.
He Fengtian	Gu Huan	A physician who initially gets close to Huo Xuan to make use of her, but later falls in love with her.
Liu Zequn	Tian Rujing	Descendant of Mount Yunjin. A royal celestial master. He possesses a bracelet which can control time and space, and attempts to use it on Chuyu. He falls in love with Chuyu.
Zhao Shunran	Guan Canghai	Rong Zhi's senior brother. A man with cold temperament, and possesses highly skilled martial arts and vast knowledge. He was blinded by Rong Zhi and retreated to a forest.
Zhang Nan	Zhong Niannian	Liu Sang's sister. She and Wang Yizhi admire each other. She was saved by Rong Zhi, and then reunited with her brother.
Ye Shengtong	Xiao Daocheng	A talented Qin player. He initially hates Chuyu, but later becomes close friends with her.
Li Chun Ai	Feng Hongxiu	Commander of the Huo Army.
Chai Wei	Princess	Princess of Jin Dynasty.
Li Jiacheng	Prince Consort	Sima Xingnan's husband.

== Soundtrack ==
No.	Title	Lyrics	Music	Singers	Length
1.	"Untouchable Lovers (凤囚凰)" (Theme song)	Yu Zheng	Tan Xuan	Bai Lu
2.	"Hatred of Jiang Nan (江南恨)" (Ending theme song)	Yu Zheng	Lu Hu	Lu Hu

== Ratings ==
Episode #	Original broadcast date	Average audience share (CSM52)		Ranking	Average audience share (National Average)		Ranking
Episode #	Original broadcast date	Ratings	Audience share	Ranking	Ratings	Audience share	Ranking
1–2	January 14, 2018	0.795	5.924	5	0.48	4.34	4
3–4	January 15, 2018	0.656	5.223	8	0.54	5.18	5
5–6	January 21, 2018	0.776	5.296	6	0.64	5.21	6
7–8	January 22, 2018	0.752	5.524	7	0.53	4.82	7
9–10	January 29, 2018	0.827	5.974	6	0.62	5.19	7
11–12	February 4, 2018	0.668	4.726	5	0.65	5.31	6
13–14	February 5, 2018	0.74	5.529	6	0.73	6.09	7
15–16	February 11, 2018	0.867	5.345	3	0.83	5.594	4
17–18	February 12, 2018	0.891	5.984	3	0.77	5.54	5
19–20	February 18, 2018	0.788	4.974	2	0.74	5.21	3
21–22	February 19, 2018	0.714	4.464	4	0.88	6.19	4
23–24	February 25, 2018	0.684	4.63	6	0.71	5.64	5
25–26	February 26, 2018	0.646	4.464	4	0.73	5.8	5
27–28	March 4, 2018	0.602	4.526	6	0.49	4.62	6
29–30	March 5, 2018	0.79	6.692	6	0.5	5.28	8
31–32	March 11, 2018	0.681	4.89	6	0.46	4.28	7
33–34	March 12, 2018	0.659	5.868	7	0.44	5.12	9
35–36	March 18, 2018	0.654	5.038	6	0.41	4.24	8
37–38	March 19, 2018	0.7	5.637	6	0.43	4.43	10
39–40	March 25, 2018	0.671	5.117	4	0.45	4.26	7
41–42	March 26, 2018	0.613	3.354	8	0.38	4.19	10
43–44	April 1, 2018	0.585	4.755	6	0.36	3.73	8
45–46	April 2, 2018	0.738	6.483	3	0.37	4.23	10
47–48	April 8, 2018	0.591	5.042	7	0.33	3.54	10
51–52	April 15, 2018	0.719	5.913	4	0.33	3.43	9
53–54	April 16, 2018	0.768	7.174	5	0.39	4.47	9
Average		0.716	5.4	—N/a	0.54	4.82	—N/a

== International broadcast ==
Network(s)/Station(s)	Series premiere		Title
China	Hunan TV	January 14, 2018 – April 16, 2018 (Two episodes broadcast from Sunday to Monday 22:00-00:00)	凤囚凰 (Untouchable Lovers; lit: )
China; Taiwan	Mango TV iQIYI	January 14, 2018 – April 16, 2018 (Update two episodes from Sunday to Monday 23:00 (Members look first), Unlocked at 24:00 the next day) (The viewers who watched the first episode of the day on TV From 23:00 in the advertising period VIP users can watch the second episode of the day in advance)	凤囚凰 (Untouchable Lovers; lit: )
Malaysia	Astro Quan Jia HD (308)	February 28, 2018-March 15 (Saturday to Thursday 20:00-21:00)	凤囚凰 (Untouchable Lovers; lit: )
Malaysia	Astro Quan Jia HD (308)	March 18, 2018-April 19 (Sunday to Thursday 20:00-21:00)	凤囚凰 (Untouchable Lovers; lit: )
Malaysia	Astro Quan Jia HD (308)	April 23, 2018-May 8 (Monday to Friday 20:00-21:00)	凤囚凰 (Untouchable Lovers; lit: )
Thailand	Amarin TV 34	November 12, 2018 - January 30, 2019 (Every Monday - Thursday at 11:30 PM – 8:00 PM (originally broadcasting Monday - Friday from 1:30 PM – 2:30 PM).)	องค์หญิงสวมรอย (Untouchable Lovers; lit: )
Thailand	Amarin TV 34	October 5, 2020 - (Every Monday - Thursday at 3:45 PM – 4:45 PM)	องค์หญิงสวมรอย (Untouchable Lovers; lit: )
