= Emperor Xiaowu =

Emperor Xiaowu may refer to:

- Emperor Xiaowu of Jin (362–396)
- Emperor Xiaowu of Song (430–464)
- Emperor Xiaowu of Northern Wei (510–535)
