= Empress Dowager Zhao =

Empress Dowager Zhao may refer to:

- Queen Dowager Zhao (died 228 BC), mother of Qin Shi Huang
- Zhao Feiyan (died 1 BC), empress dowager during Emperor Ai of Han's reign
- Lu Huinan (412–466), mother of Liu Jun (Emperor Xiaowu of Liu Song)
