= Liu Chuyu =

Chinese princess of the Liu Song dynasty (d. 466)

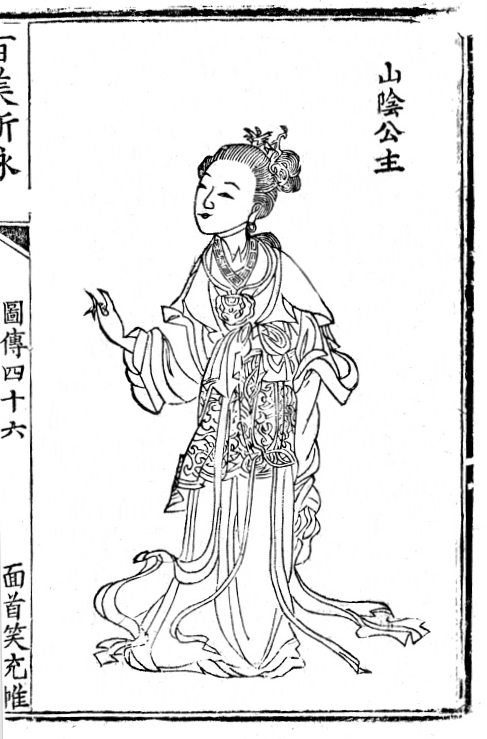
- 18th century depiction of Liu Chuyu
- Born: c.443 (Note: While Lady Liu's birth year was not recorded, she was almost certainly born in or after 443, as that was the year her mother Wang Xianyuan married her father.)
- Died: 2 January 466(aged 22-23)
- Spouse: He Ji
- Father: Emperor Xiaowu of Song
- Mother: Empress Wang Xianyuan

Chinese name
- Traditional Chinese: 山陰公主
- Simplified Chinese: 山阴公主
Transcriptions
Standard Mandarin
- Hanyu Pinyin: Shānyīn Gōngzhǔ

Personal name
- Traditional Chinese: 劉楚玉
- Simplified Chinese: 刘楚玉
Transcriptions
Standard Mandarin
- Hanyu Pinyin: Liú Chǔyù

Liu Chuyu (劉楚玉) (died 2 January 466), often known by her title Princess Shanyin (山陰公主), although her title at death was the greater title of Princess Kuaiji (會稽公主), was a princess of the Chinese Liu Song dynasty. She was a daughter of Emperor Xiaowu. She was also the older sister of Emperor Liu Ziye.

== Life ==
Liu Chuyu was the eldest daughter (Note: Wang Xianyuan's biography in Book of Song listed Liu Chuyu behind Liu's two full brothers: Liu Ziye (Emperor Qianfei) and Liu Zishang. The birth order of Lady Liu and her two full brothers is not known. Since Liu Ziye was born about 6 years after his parents' wedding, it is likely that Liu Chuyu was born before Liu Ziye and thus was their parents' eldest child.) among the six children of Emperor Xiaowu's wife Empress Wang Xianyuan. Her birth date isn't known, but it is believed that she was born before her father became emperor in May 453. Liu Chuyu's mother, the Empress Wenmu, was favored by her husband, even after he took other consorts. One of Liu Chuyu's great-grandmothers (mother of her maternal grandfather Wang Yan) was Princess Poyang of Jin (fl.370s - 403), a daughter of Emperor Jianwen and Li Lingrong. (Note: Wang Xianyuan's biography in Book of Song and vol.23 of Nan Shi both recorded that Princess Poyang was Emperor Xiaowu's daughter, while Wang Dao's and Li Lingrong's biographies in Book of Jin recorded that Princess Poyang was Emperor Xiaowu's younger sister and married Wang Xianyuan's paternal grandfather Wang Gu (王嘏). Given that Emperor Xiaowu was about 40 years older than Wang Yan, the emperor is more likely to be Wang's maternal uncle.)

During her father's reign, he appointed her the Princess Shanyin and married her to He Ji (何戢), a son of his official He Yan (何偃). He Ji was also the father of He Jingying, who would later become an empress of the Southern Qi dynasty.

After her father's death in July 464, her full younger brother Liu Ziye became emperor (as Emperor Qianfei). She became one of the people who often attended him while he visited places outside the palace. On one occasion, she told him:

"While our genders are different, we are born of the same father. However, you have more than 10,000 women in your palaces, and I only have one husband, and this is unfair."

In response, Emperor Qianfei selected 30 young handsome men for her, calling them her mianshou (面首, literally meaning "prime faces"), for them to be her lovers. From this point on in Chinese history, mianshou became a term for women's male lovers, often referring to lovers of honored women. He also promoted her to the greater title of Princess Kuaiji.

However, Liu Chuyu was not content, and when she saw how Emperor Qianfei's mid-level official Chu Yuan was young and handsome, she requested Emperor Qianfei to give her Chu as a lover. (Note: According to Chu Yuan's biography in Book of the Southern Qi, his wife was Princess Nanjun (南郡公主), daughter of Emperor Wen of Song, and Liu Chuyu's aunt.) Emperor Qianfei agreed. Chu was ordered to attend to her for more than 10 days, and she tempted him throughout that period. Ultimately, Chu refused to have sexual relations with her, and she released him.

In January 466, after Emperor Qianfei was assassinated by his attendant Shou Jizhi (壽寂之), his uncle Liu Yu the Prince of Xiangdong became emperor (as Emperor Ming). Even before he actually took the throne, however, he issued an edict in the name of Liu Chuyu's grandmother Grand Empress Dowager Lu Huinan, condemning Liu Chuyu for her immorality and her younger brother Liu Zishang (劉子尚) the Prince of Yuzhang for violence, and ordering them both to die by suicide.

While Liu Chuyu and her husband did not have any children together, when He Ji and his concubine Song's daughter He Jingying became the wife of the crown prince Xiao Zhaoye, Li Chuyu was posthumously honored as mother-in-law.

== In popular culture ==
In the 2018 drama Untouchable Lovers, Guan Xiaotong portrayed Liu Chuyu.
