= 485 =

Calendar year

485 in various calendars
- Gregorian calendar: 485; CDLXXXV
- Ab urbe condita: 1238
- Assyrian calendar: 5235
- Balinese saka calendar: 406–407
- Bengali calendar: −109 – −108
- Berber calendar: 1435
- Buddhist calendar: 1029
- Burmese calendar: −153
- Byzantine calendar: 5993–5994
- Chinese calendar: 甲子年 (Wood Rat); 3182 or 2975 — to — 乙丑年 (Wood Ox); 3183 or 2976
- Coptic calendar: 201–202
- Discordian calendar: 1651
- Ethiopian calendar: 477–478
- Hebrew calendar: 4245–4246
- Hindu calendars
- Vikram Samvat: 541–542
- Shaka Samvat: 406–407
- Kali Yuga: 3585–3586
- Holocene calendar: 10485
- Iranian calendar: 137 BP – 136 BP
- Islamic calendar: 141 BH – 140 BH
- Javanese calendar: 371–372
- Julian calendar: 485; CDLXXXV
- Korean calendar: 2818
- Minguo calendar: 1427 before ROC 民前1427年
- Nanakshahi calendar: −983
- Seleucid era: 796/797 AG
- Thai solar calendar: 1027–1028
- Tibetan calendar: ཤིང་ཕོ་བྱི་བ་ལོ་ (male Wood-Rat); 611 or 230 or −542 — to — ཤིང་མོ་གླང་ལོ་ (female Wood-Ox); 612 or 231 or −541

Year 485 (CDLXXXV) was a common year starting on Tuesday of the Julian calendar. At the time, it was known as the Year of the Consulship of Memmius without colleague (or, less frequently, year 1238 Ab urbe condita). The denomination 485 for this year has been used since the early medieval period, when the Anno Domini calendar era became the prevalent method in Europe for naming years.

== Events ==
=== By place ===
==== Britannia ====
- Aelle of Sussex, king of the South Saxons, fights the Britons at the stream of Mercredesburne. The battle ends in a draw (according to the Anglo-Saxon Chronicle).
- Period of Arthur's "twelve battles", during which he gains reputation for invincibility (approximate date).

==== Asia ====
- Emperor Xiaowen institutes an "equal-field" system of agriculture (juntian), assigning each peasant family about 19 acres (140 mu) of land. The land will be part minority divided by the farmer to be kept indefinitely and rest will revert to the state if the farmer dies or retires. The population is then divided by each other with the role of supervising one another. The result of this reform is that farmers mostly did not sell their holdings to large landowners. This provided the fiscal basis for the formation of the Sui and Tang dynasties.
- Fearing of a war with the Southern Qi, Jiaozhou governor Lý Thúc Hiến surrendered, officially marking the end of nearly 20 years of Lý clan rule in the region.
- Prince Kenzō succeeds his adoptive father Seinei, and becomes the 23rd emperor of Japan.

=== By topic ===
==== Religion ====
- Peter the Fuller, patriarch of Antioch, is condemned and excommunicated by a synod of Western bishops at Rome.

== Births ==
- Cassiodorus, Roman statesman and writer (approximate date)
- Samson of Dol, bishop and saint (approximate date)

== Deaths ==
- April 17 – Proclus, Greek Neoplatonist philosopher (b. 412)
- Asclepigenia, Athenian philosopher and mystic (b. 430)
- Fincath mac Garrchu, king of Leinster
