= Empress Wenmu (disambiguation) =

Empress Wenmu (Chinese: 文穆皇后) usually refers to Wang Xianyuan (427–464), an empress of the Liu Song dynasty from 453–464.

Empress Wenmu may also refer to:

- Han Qiji (died 496), posthumously honored as an empress by her grandson Emperor Wenxuan of Northern Qi
- Li Yuanhua (483–524), posthumously honored as an empress by her son Emperor Xiaozhuang of Northern Wei
- Lady Zhao (fl. 6th century?), posthumously honored as an empress by her granddaughter Wu Zetian

== See also ==
- Emperor Wenmu (disambiguation)
