= Emperor Wenmu =

Emperor Wenmu may refer to:

- Gao Shusheng (472–526), posthumously honored as an emperor by his grandson Emperor Wenxuan of Northern Qi
- Yuan Xie (473–508), posthumously honored as an emperor by his son Emperor Xiaozhuang of Northern Wei
- Wu Hua (fl. 6th century?), posthumously honored as an emperor by his granddaughter Wu Zetian
- Zhu Cheng (fl. 9th century), posthumously honored as an emperor by his son Zhu Wen

== See also ==
- Qian Yuanguan (887–941), or King Wenmu of Wuyue
- Empress Wenmu (disambiguation)
