= Wang Xianyuan =

Wang Xianyuan 王憲嫄

Empress consort of Liu Song
- Tenure: 5 June 453 – 12 July 464
- Predecessor: Empress Yin
- Successor: Empress Lu
- Born: c.427
- Died: 9 October 464 (aged 36–37); Jiankang, Liu Song
- Spouse: Emperor Xiaowu of Song
- Issue: Liu Chuyu, Princess Kuaiji (446? (Note: Lady Liu's birth year and her age when she died were not recorded. However, it is likely that she was born in or after 443 as that was the year her parents married.) – 2 January 466 (Note: According to Emperor Ming's biography in Book of Song, Lady Liu and her brother Liu Zishang were ordered to commit suicide on the jiwei day of the 11th month of the 1st year of the Yongguang era. This corresponds to 2 Jan 466 in the Julian calendar.)); Liu Ziye, Emperor Qianfei (449–466); Liu Zishang, Prince of Yizhang (450 (Note: According to Liu Zishang's biography in Book of Song, he was 16 (by East Asian reckoning) when he died. Thus, his birth year should be 450.) – 2 January 466)
Posthumous name
- Empress Xiaowenmu (孝武文穆皇后)
- Father: Wang Yan (c.403 - 28 February 456) (Note: Lady Wang's biography in Book of Song recorded that her father died at the age of 54 (by East Asian reckoning) in the 2nd year of the Xiaojian era of Emperor Xiaowu's reign; the annals of Emperor Xiaowu in the same work recorded that Wang Yan died on the guihai day of the 2nd month of the 3rd year of the Xiaojian era, which corresponds to 28 Feb 456 in the Julian calendar.)
- Mother: Princess Wuxing?

Wang Xianyuan (Chinese: 王憲嫄; c.427 – 9 October 464), formally Empress Xiaowuwenmu (孝武文穆皇后, literally "the filial, martial, civil and solemn empress"), was an empress of the Chinese Liu Song dynasty. Her husband was Emperor Xiaowu (Liu Jun).

== Background ==
Wang Xianyuan came from a noble family, as her father Wang Yan (王偃) was a member of the Wang clan of Langya, being a great-great-grandson of the famed Jin prime minister Wang Dao. Wang Yan's father Wang Gu (王嘏) was a Jin minister; Yan's mother was Princess Poyang (fl.370s - 403), a daughter of Emperor Jianwen of Jin and Li Lingrong. (Note: In Lady Wang's biography in Book of Song and vol.23 of Nan Shi, Princess Poyang was recorded as being Emperor Xiaowu's daughter. In his Jiao Kan Ji, Qing-era commentator Zhang Senkai (张森楷) noted that in Wang Dao's and Li Lingrong's biographies in Book of Jin, Princess Poyang was recorded as Emperor Jianwen's daughter, and thus Emperor Xiaowu's sister. As Emperor Xiaowu was about 40 years older than Wang Yan, the emperor is more likely to be Wang's maternal uncle.) Wang Yan's wife was also a princess—Liu Rongnan (劉榮男), the Princess Wuxing, daughter of Liu Song's founder Emperor Wu. (Note: It is not clear if Princess Wuxing was Wang Xianyuan's birth mother.)

Wang Xianyuan married Liu Jun in 443, when he was the Prince of Wuling under his father Emperor Wen, and she therefore carried the title Princess of Wuling. She was much favored by Liu Jun, and they had at least six children—his two oldest sons Liu Ziye and Liu Zishang (劉子尚), and daughters Liu Chuyu, Liu Chupei (劉楚佩), Liu Chuxiu (劉楚琇), and Liu Xiuming (劉脩明).

== As empress consort ==
After Liu Jun's older half-brother Liu Shao the Crown Prince assassinated their father Emperor Wen in 453 and took over the throne himself, Liu Jun started an uprising, and later that year captured and killed Liu Shao, taking the throne himself as Emperor Xiaowu. During the campaign, Princess Wang remained at his defense post Xunyang (尋陽, in modern Jiujiang, Jiangxi) and did not accompany him in attacking the capital Jiankang, although upon his victory she and his mother Consort Lu Huinan were welcomed to the capital, and Princess Wang was created empress. In 454, he created her son Liu Ziye crown prince.

Little is known about Empress Wang's life during her husband's reign. However, he had a large number of concubines, and was also said to be so sexually immoral that he had a number of incestuous liaisons—including with the daughters of his uncle Liu Yixuan (劉義宣) the Prince of Nan Commandery, and according to the Book of Song, rumors at the time suggested that even with his own mother Empress Dowager Lu. One of Liu Yixuan's daughters, whom Emperor Xiaowu gave the alias Consort Yin, (Note: The cover story was that she was a relative of his official Yin Yan (殷琰).) was particularly favored by Emperor Xiaowu, and Empress Wang's own favor in Emperor Xiaowu's eyes appeared to have greatly decreased. However, Empress Wang's position appeared to never have been threatened, even though her husband at times considered replacing her impulsive son Liu Ziye as crown prince with Consort Yin's son Liu Ziluan (劉子鸞) the Prince of Xin'an. A rare reference to herself was in 460, when she presided over a ceremony where she personally fed mulberry leaves to silkworms, to show the imperial household's attention to farming. Empress Dowager Lu was in attendance.

In July 464, Emperor Xiaowu died. Liu Ziye succeeded him (as Emperor Qianfei). He honored Empress Wang as empress dowager on 31 August.

== As empress dowager ==
Emperor Qianfei immediately showed himself to be a cruel and arbitrary ruler, and there was little Empress Dowager Wang could do to control her son. In fall 464, she grew seriously ill, and she asked that Emperor Qianfei be summoned. He refused—stating that in sick people's rooms there would be ghosts, and he could not go. In anger, she told her servant girls, "Bring a sword and cut me open, to see how it is this animal came out of me!" She soon died and was buried with her husband Emperor Xiaowu on 4 November; she had outlived him by about three months.

== Notes ==
Chinese royalty
| Preceded by Empress Yin Yuying | Empress of Liu Song; 453–464 | Succeeded by Empress Lu |
