= Emperor Xiaowu of Song =

Emperor Xiaowu of Song 宋孝武帝
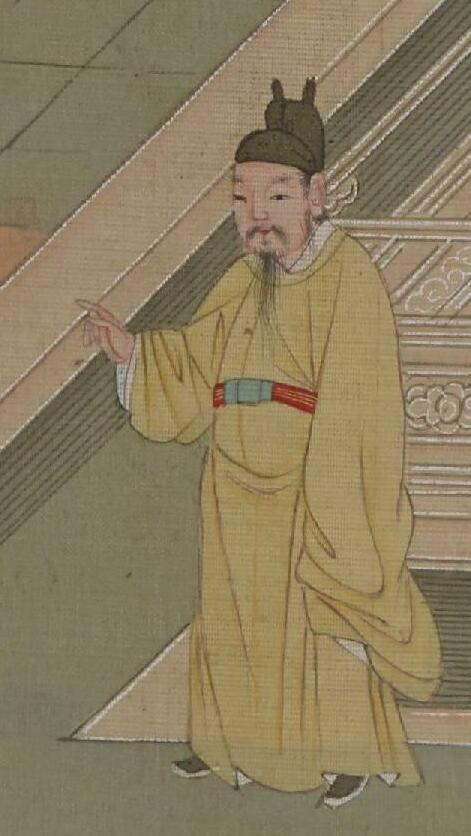
- Emperor Xiaowu as depicted in the 18th-century Chinese-French edition of the Dijian Tushuo, Recueil Historique de Principaux Traits de la Vie des Empereurs Chinois

Emperor of Liu Song
- Reign: 20 May 453 – 12 July 464
- Predecessor: Liu Shao
- Successor: Emperor Qianfei
- Born: Liu Daomin (劉道民); September 19, 430
- Died: 12 July 464 (aged 33); Jiankang, Liu Song
- Burial: Jingning Mausoleum (景寧陵)
Names
- Family name: Liu (劉); Given name: Jun (駿); Courtesy name: Xiulong (休龍); Childhood name: Daomin (道民)
Era dates
- Xiaojian (孝建): 454–456; Daming (大明): 457–464
Posthumous name
- Emperor Xiaowu (孝武皇帝, lit. "Filial Martial Emperor")
Temple name
- Shizu (世祖)
- Father: Emperor Wen
- Mother: Empress Dowager Zhao

Emperor Xiaowu of Song (Chinese: 宋孝武帝; 19 September 430 – 12 July 464), personal name Liu Jun (劉駿), courtesy name Xiulong (休龍), childhood name Daomin (道民), was the fifth emperor of the Liu Song dynasty of China. He was a son of Emperor Wen. After his older brother Liu Shao assassinated their father in 453 and took the throne, he rose in rebellion and overthrew Liu Shao. He was generally regarded as a capable, but harsh and sexually immoral emperor. He curtailed the powers of the officials and imperial princes greatly during his reign.

== Background ==
Liu Jun was born in 430, as Emperor Wen's third son. His mother, Consort Lu Huinan, was not one of Emperor Wen's favorite consorts, and he was also not much favored by his father. In 435, he was created the Prince of Wuling. In 439, at age nine, he was made the governor of Xiang Province (湘州, modern Hunan). For the next several years, he was rotated through the provinces, although he did not appear to be actually at all in charge until 445, when he was made the governor of Yong Province (雍州, modern northwestern Hubei and southwestern Henan), an important province militarily due to its location on the border with rival Northern Wei; Emperor Wen was also interested in recovering provinces lost to Northern Wei during the reign of his brother Emperor Shao. Thus, the governor of Yong province was considered a key post. As his mother was not favored by the Emperor, she mostly accompanied him rather than remaining at the palace in the capital Jiankang.

In 448, Liu Jun was made the governor of the equally important Xu Province (徐州, modern northern Jiangsu and northern Anhui), with its capital at Pengcheng, and it was there that he was involved in a major war between Liu Song and Northern Wei. In 450, with Emperor Wen's northern advances not only repelled by Emperor Taiwu of Northern Wei, but with Northern Wei troops under Emperor Taiwu attacking south in retaliation, Northern Wei troops quickly reached Pengcheng. Liu Jun's uncle Liu Yigong (劉義恭) the Prince of Jiangxia, the commander of the northern troops, wanted to abandon Pengcheng, at the suggestion of Zhang Chang (張暢), Liu Jun insisted on defending Pengcheng, and Liu Yigong gave up his plan to flee. Emperor Taiwu, after diplomatic parlaying at Pengcheng, continued advancing south, all the way to the Yangtze River, before withdrawing in 451. Despite holding Pengcheng, Liu Jun was slightly demoted after the war. (Note: During the war, at the instigation of Liu Jun, his older brother Liu Shao the Crown Prince, and He Shangzhi (何尚之), Emperor Wen put his brother Liu Yikang, the former prime minister who had been deposed in 440, to death.) In 452, Liu Jun was appointed the governor of South Yan Province (南兗州, modern central Jiangsu), and then of Jiang Province (江州, modern Jiangxi and Fujian).

== Uprising against Liu Shao ==
In 452, Liu Shao and another brother, Liu Xiuming the Prince of Shixing, were caught in a scandal where they had engaged a witch to curse Emperor Wen to death so Liu Shao could become emperor faster, and Emperor Wen was set on deposing them. Liu Shao, in 453, then led a coup d'etat and assassinated Emperor Wen, taking over as emperor himself. At this time, Liu Jun the Prince of Wuling was at Wuzhou (五洲, a small island on the Yangtze River in modern Huanggang, Hubei) preparing to attack rebellious aborigines in the region. His communications officer Dong Yuansi (董元嗣) arrived from Jiankang and informed him how Liu Shao had assassinated Emperor Wen, and he in turn had Dong inform it to his subordinates.

Meanwhile, Liu Shao wrote a secret letter to the general Shen Qingzhi (沈慶之), who at the time was with Liu Jun. However, Shen had no intentions of following Liu Shao's orders, and after showing the letter to Liu Jun, ordered his troops to enter a state of emergency, preparing a major rebellion against Liu Shao. Meanwhile, Liu Jun's uncle Liu Yixuan (劉義宣) the Prince of Nanqiao and governor of Jing Province (荊州, modern Hubei), and Zang Zhi (臧質) the governor of Yong Province both refused Liu Shao's promotions as well and sent messengers to Liu Jun, requesting that he declare himself emperor. Liu Jun first returned to the capital of Jiang Province, Xunyang (尋陽, in modern Jiujiang, Jiangxi), and then issued declarations requesting other governors to join him. Liu Yixuan and Zang Zhi soon arrived with their troops, and they quickly advanced toward Jiankang. Meanwhile, Liu Jun's brother Liu Dan (劉誕) the Prince of Sui, the governor of Kuaiji Commandery along the southern shore of Hangzhou Bay, also declared support for Liu Jun.

In less than a month, Liu Jun arrived in the vicinity of Jiankang; during the journey, however, he suffered a major illness, during which his assistant Yan Jun (顔竣) had to impersonate him to avoid public knowledge that he was ill. Initially, Liu Shao's troops had minor success over his, but one of Liu Shao's major generals, Lu Xiu (魯秀), soon sabotaged his efforts and then fled to Liu Jun's camp. Liu Jun soon declared himself emperor (as Emperor Xiaowu), while the battle was continuing to be waged. Seven days later, the palace fell, and Liu Shao and Liu Xiuming the Prince of Shixing were captured and executed. Emperor Xiaowu settled in Jiankang, welcoming his mother Consort Lu and his wife Princess Wang Xianyuan to the capital, honoring his mother as empress dowager and his wife as empress. He also created his oldest son Liu Ziye crown prince.

== Reign ==
=== Rebellion of Four Provinces ===
One major issue with Emperor Xiaowu's personal conduct immediately became a political issue as well—as he was said to have engaged in incest with all of Liu Yixuan's daughters who remained in Jiankang, drawing Liu Yixuan's ire. Because of both Liu Yixuan's and Zang Zhi's contributions to Xiaowu's cause, they can hold absolute powers within their domains (Jing and Jiang Province, respectively). Yet Emperor Xiaowu was trying to establish his personal authority and therefore often overrode and questioned their actions. Liu Yixuan and Zang resolved to rebel. In spring 454, they sent messengers to persuade Lu Xiu's brother Lu Shuang (魯爽) the governor of Yu Province (豫州, modern central Anhui) to join them in rebellion in the fall—but when the messengers arrived, Lu Shuang was so drunk that he misunderstood the messengers and declared a rebellion immediately, declaring Liu Yixuan emperor, and he was joined by Xu Yibao (徐遺寶) the governor of Yan Province (兗州, modern western Shandong). Upon hearing Lu Shuang's premature actions, Liu Yixuan and Zang had to quickly declare rebellion as well, although they fell short of declaring Liu Yixuan emperor.

Emperor Xiaowu, hearing of the four provinces' rebellion, initially felt that he was unable to withstand them and considered offering the throne to Liu Yixuan, but at earnest opposition by his brother Liu Dan the Prince of Jingling, decided to resist. Most of the other provinces quickly declared their support for Emperor Xiaowu, and Yuan Huzhi (垣護之) the governor of Ji Province (冀州, modern northwestern Shandong), along with Ming Yin (明胤) and Xiahou Zuhuan (夏侯祖歡) quickly defeated Xu, forcing him to flee to Lu Shuang. Lu's ferocity in battle was feared by many, but he continued to drink heavily throughout the campaign, and when he encountered the troops of Emperor Xiaowu's general Xue Andu (薛安都), he fell off his horse and was killed, greatly discouraging Liu Yixuan's and Zang's troops. Liu Yixuan also did not personally trust Zang, and declined Zang's strategy of attacking Jiankang directly, instead choosing to engage Emperor Xiaowu's troops at Liangshan (梁山, in modern Chaohu, Anhui), and after some initial losses, Liu Yixuan's troops collapsed, and he fled. Zang was forced to flee as well, and soon was killed in flight. Liu Yixuan was captured and executed, ending this episode of opposition against Emperor Xiaowu. In response to the rebellion, Emperor Xiaowu decided to cut down on the strengths of the major provinces (Jing, Jiang, as well as the capital province Yang Province (揚州, modern Zhejiang and southern Jiangsu) by reducing them in size, carving East Yang Province (東揚州, modern central and eastern Zhejiang) out of Yang and Ying Province (郢州, modern eastern Hubei) out of Jing and Jiang Provinces, which had the side effect, however, of adding administrative expenses due to the multiplicity of provinces.

=== Middle reign ===
In 455, Emperor Xiaowu's 16-year-old younger brother Liu Hun (劉渾) the Prince of Wuchang, the governor of Yong Province, in jest, wrote a declaration in which he referred to himself as the Prince of Chu and changed era name—but Liu Hun had no intention whatsoever to rebel. However, when this document was brought to Emperor Xiaowu's intention, Emperor Xiaowu stripped Liu Hun of his title and reduced him to commoner rank, and then further forced Liu Hun to commit suicide. This would start a trend in which Emperor Xiaowu suppressed the authority of his brothers. In addition, the authority of the provincial communication officers, because they served as liaisons between the emperor and the provincial governors and doubled as the emperor's watchdogs on the provincial governors, began to expand greatly.

Emperor Xiaowu, after he had completed the mourning period for his father Emperor Wen, began to spend his energy on various pleasures and construction projects. Yan Jun the mayor of Jiankang, who had assisted him greatly during his campaign against Liu Shao and who had been a long-time subordinate of his, repeatedly urged him to change his ways, and Emperor Xiaowu became displeased at him, and sent him away to be the governor of East Yang Province. Meanwhile, Emperor Xiaowu also became suspicious of his brother Liu Dan the Prince of Jingling, then the governor of South Yan Province, who was capable and who had gathered many warriors about him, and he set up military safeguards between Liu Dan's post at Guangling (廣陵, in modern Yangzhou, Jiangsu) and the capital.

In 458, a coup plot by Gao Du (高闍) and the Buddhist monk Tanbiao (曇標) was discovered, and Emperor Xiaowu issued an edict reducing the number of monks and nuns greatly, but because members of Emperor Xiaowu's households often associated with nuns, the edict never actually took effect. Emperor Xiaowu also took this opportunity to falsely accuse the official Wang Sengda (王僧達), who had disrespected Empress Dowager Lu's nephew Lu Qiongzhi (路瓊之), of being involved in Gao's rebellion, after being urged to kill Wang by Empress Dowager Lu.

With Emperor Xiaowu being distrustful of high level officials, he often consulted his long-time associates Dai Faxing (戴法興), Dai Mingbao (戴明寶), and Chao Shangzhi (巢尚之). The three became therefore very powerful and wealthy, notwithstanding their actual relatively low rank.

=== Liu Dan's rebellion ===
By 459, there were many rumors that Liu Dan was going to rebel or that Emperor Xiaowu was going to act against Liu Dan, and Liu Dan built strong defenses around Guangling in response. Meanwhile, upon reports of Liu Dan's crimes (Note: which appeared to have been instigated by Emperor Xiaowu himself), Emperor Xiaowu issued an edict demoting Liu Dan to marquess, and at the same time sent the general Yuan Tian (垣闐) and Dai Mingbao to make a surprise attack on Guangling. When they approached, however, Liu Dan detected the surprise attack and counterattacked, killing Yuan Tian. Liu Dan made public declarations of Emperor Xiaowu's incestuous relationships (Note: including an allegation, which some historians believed to be true, that he had an incestuous relationship with his mother Empress Dowager Lu), infuriating Emperor Xiaowu, who proceeded to slaughter the families of all of Liu Dan's associates—many of whom had not been aware of Liu Dan's plans and had in fact fled out of Guangling back to Jiankang upon the battle being waged, only to find their families already dead.

Emperor Xiaowu sent Shen Qingzhi against Liu Dan, and Shen put Guangling under siege after cutting off Liu Dan's potential path of fleeing to Northern Wei. Liu Dan briefly abandoned Guangling and tried to flee, but upon urging by his associates returned to Guangling and defended it. Meanwhile, Emperor Xiaowu, also believing that Yan Jun had revealed his personal indiscretions, falsely accused Yan of having been a part of Liu Dan's rebellion, and first broke Yan's legs and then forced him to commit suicide, killing all male members of Yan's household after Yan had died. Shen soon captured Guangling and killed Liu Dan; upon Emperor Xiaowu's orders, most of Guangling's population was slaughtered in inhumane ways.

=== Late reign ===
In 461, Emperor Xiaowu's impulsive younger brother Liu Xiumao (劉休茂) the Prince of Hailing, the governor of Yong Province, angry that his communications officers Yang Qing (楊慶) and Dai Shuang (戴雙) and military officer Yu Shenzhi (庾深之) curbed his powers, started a rebellion that was quickly put down by Liu Xiumao's own subordinates. Knowing that Emperor Xiaowu had become increasingly suspicious of all of his brothers, his uncle Liu Yigong, now prime minister, suggested that imperial princes be prohibited from having weapons, from being governors of border provinces, and from associating with people other than members of their household. At the urging of Shen Huaiwen (沈懷文), however, Liu Yigong's suggestions were not acted upon.

In 462, Emperor Xiaowu's favorite concubine Consort Yin died. (Note: Most historians believe that Consort Yin was actually a daughter of Liu Yixuan, whom Emperor Xiaowu officially made a consort after Liu Yixuan's death but covered up the incestuous relationship by claiming that she was from the household of his official Yin Yan (殷琰). However, some believe Consort Yin to have actually been from Yin's household and been given to Liu Yixuan before Emperor Xiaowu took her as his own after Liu Yixuan's death.) He mourned her so greatly that he was unable to carry on the matters of state, and he built a magnificent tomb and temple for her, forcing many commoners into laboring for these projects.

In 464, Emperor Xiaowu died, and was succeeded by his son Liu Ziye (as Emperor Qianfei). The Song dynasty historian Sima Guang, in his Zizhi Tongjian, made the following comments about the late years of Emperor Xiaowu's reign:

Late in his reign, [Emperor Xiaowu] was particularly greedy. Whenever provincial or commandery governors left their post and returned to the capital, the emperor ordered them to submit sufficient amounts of tributes, and also gambled with them without ceasing until he would win over their wealths. He was often drunk everyday and was rarely sober, but his reactions were quick. He often slept in stupor on his desk, but if there were emergency submissions from the officials, he could wake himself quickly and be alerted without sign of intoxication. Therefore, his officials were all fearful of him and did not dare to be idle.

== Era names ==
- Xiaojian (孝建 xiào jiàn) 454-456
- Daming (大明 dà míng) 457-464

== Family ==
- Empress Wenmu, of the Wang clan of Langya (文穆皇后 琊瑯王氏; 428–464), first cousin, personal name Xianyuan (憲嫄)
  - Princess Kuaiji (會稽公主; 446–466), personal name Chuyu (楚玉)
    - Married He Ji of Lujiang (廬江 何戢; 446–482)
  - Princess Kang'ai Linhuai (臨淮康哀公主), personal name Chupei (楚佩), third daughter
    - Married Wang Ying of Langya (琊瑯 王瑩; d. 516)
  - Liu Ziye, Emperor (皇帝 劉子業; 449–466), first son
  - Liu Zishang, Prince of Yuzhang (豫章王 劉子尚; 451–466), second son
  - A daughter, personal name Chuxiu (楚琇)
  - Princess Kangle (康樂公主), personal name Xiuming (修明)
    - Married Xu Xiaosi of Donghai (東海 徐孝嗣; 453–499), and had issue (two sons)
- Noble Consort Xuan, of the Yin clan (宣貴妃 殷氏; d. 462), first cousin
  - Liu Ziluan, Prince Xiaojing of Shiping (始平孝敬王 劉子鸞; 456–465), eighth son
  - Liu Ziyu, Prince Jing of Qi (齊敬王 劉子羽; 458–459), 14th son
  - Liu Ziyun, Prince Xiao of Jinling (晉陵孝王 劉子云; 459–462), 19th son
  - Liu Ziwen (劉子文), 20th son
  - Liu Zishi, Prince Ai of Nanhai (南海哀王 劉子師; 460–465), 22nd son
  - Princess (公主; d. 465), 12th daughter
- Shuyuan, of the Chen clan; d. 466)
  - Liu Zixun, Prince of Jin'an (晉安王 劉子勳; 456–466), third son
- Shuyi, of the He clan (淑儀 何氏)
  - Liu Zifang, Prince of Xunyang (尋陽王 劉子房; 460–466), sixth son
- Zhaohua, of the Shi clan (昭華 史氏)
  - Liu Zixu, Prince of Linhai (臨海王 劉子頊; 456–466), seventh son
- Zhaoyi, of the Shi clan (昭儀 史氏)
  - Liu Ziyuan, Prince of Shaoling (邵陵王 劉子元; 458–466), 13th son
- Zhaorong, of the Xu clan (昭容 徐氏)
  - Liu Zishen (劉子深; b. 456), fifth son
  - Liu Ziren, Prince of Yongjia (永嘉王 劉子仁; 457–466), ninth son
  - Liu Zichan, Prince of Nanping (南平王 劉子產; 459–466), 18th son
- Zhaorong, of the Xie clan (昭容 謝氏)
  - Liu Zizhen, Prince Shi'an (始安王 劉子真; 457–466), 11th son
  - Liu Ziyong (劉子雍), 24th son
  - Liu Zisi, Prince of Dongping (東平王 劉子嗣; 463–466), 27th son
- Jieyu, of the He clan (婕妤 何氏)
  - Liu Zifeng (劉子鳳; b. 457), tenth son
  - Liu Ziqu (劉子趨; d. 466), 25th son
- Jieyu, of the Jiang clan (婕妤 江氏)
  - Liu Zixuan (劉子玄), 12th son
  - Liu Zikuang (劉子況; b. 459), 17th son
  - Liu Zixiao, Prince Si of Huaiyang (淮陽思王 劉子霄; 461–464), 23rd son
- Jieyu, of the Yang clan (婕妤 楊氏)
  - Liu Zimeng, Prince of Huainan (淮南王 劉子孟; 459–466), 16th son
  - Liu Ziyu, Prince of Luling (廬陵王 劉子輿; 460–466), 21st son
- Ronghua, of the Ruan clan (容華 阮氏)
  - Liu Zisui, Prince of Jiangxia (江夏王 劉子綏; 456–466), fourth son
- Ronghua, of the Du clan (容華 杜氏)
  - Liu Ziyue (劉子悅; d. 466), 28th son
- Meiren, of the Jiang clan (美人 江氏)
  - Liu Ziheng (劉子衡), 15th son
  - Liu Ziqi (劉子期; d. 466), 26th son
- Unknown
  - Princess Angu (安固公主)
    - Married Wang Zhi of Langya (琊瑯 王志; 460–513)
  - Princess Linru (臨汝公主)
    - Married Jiang Xiao of Jiyang (濟陽 江敩; 452–495)
  - Princess Anji (安吉公主)
    - Married Cai Yue of Jiyang (濟陽 蔡約; 457–500)

== Notes ==
Regnal titles
| Preceded by Liu Shao | Emperor of Liu Song; 453–464 | Succeeded by Emperor Qianfei of Liu Song |
