= Liu Zixun =

Pretender of the Liu Song Dynasty
- Reign: 7 February 466 – 19 September 466
- Predecessor: Emperor Qianfei
- Successor: Emperor Ming
- Born: 456
- Died: 19 September 466 (aged 9–10)
Full name
- Family name: Líu (劉); Given name: Zǐxūn (子勛)
Era name and dates
- Yìjiā (義嘉): 7 February 466 – 19 September 466
- Dynasty: Liu Song

Liu Zixun (Chinese: 劉子勛; 456 – 19 September 466), courtesy name Xiaode (孝德), was an imperial prince and pretender to the throne of the Chinese Liu Song dynasty, who received claims of allegiance from most provinces of the state during the year 466 after his staff made a claim to the throne on his behalf, rivaling that of his uncle Emperor Ming, following the assassination of his half-brother Emperor Qianfei in January 466. The inability of his troops to defeat the outnumbered troops of Emperor Ming, however, eventually led to the collapse of his regime, and Emperor Ming's general Shen Youzhi captured and executed him at the age of 10.

== Background ==
Liu Zixun was born in 456, as Emperor Xiaowu's third son. His mother Consort Chen carried the rank Shuyuan (淑媛), the fifth rank for imperial consorts. In 460, at age four, Emperor Xiaowu created him the Prince of Jin'an, and starting in 463, he started to be rotated as a provincial governor, with staff members in actual charge of the administration of the provinces. He was said to be unfavored by Emperor Xiaowu because he had an eye illness.

In 464, Emperor Xiaowu died and was succeeded by Liu Zixun's violent and impulsive older brother Liu Ziye (as Emperor Qianfei). Emperor Qianfei, apprehensive of actual or potential threats to his authority, soon slaughtered a number of high level officials as well as his main former rival as his father's heir, his brother Liu Ziluan (劉子鸞) the Prince of Xin'an. He then saw that both his grandfather Emperor Wen and his father Emperor Xiaowu were third-born sons, and he became alarmed at that fact, and he became even more alarmed when his uncle and brother-in-law He Mai (何邁) made a failed attempt to overthrow him and put Liu Zixun on the throne. In 465, he sent poison with his attendant Zhu Jingyun (朱景雲) to Liu Zixun's post at Jiang Province (江州, modern Jiangxi and Fujian), to force Liu Zixun to commit suicide. However, as Zhu approached the capital of Jiang Province, Xunyang (尋陽, in modern Jiujiang, Jiangxi), he intentionally slowed down, and upon hearing this, Liu Zixun's staff, led by his chief of staff Deng Wan (鄧琬), declared a rebellion in Liu Zixun's name and sought support from other provinces. Quickly, his brother Liu Zisui (劉子綏) the Prince of Anlu, then the governor of Ying Province (郢州, modern eastern Hubei), declared for him. 10 days later, around the new year 466, however, Emperor Qianfei was assassinated by his attendants, and the officials supported his uncle Liu Yu the Prince of Xiangdong as emperor (as Emperor Ming).

== Failed claim to the throne ==
Emperor Ming initially tried to reward Liu Zixun for his effort to resist Emperor Qianfei by giving him honors, and most members of Liu Zixun's staff wanted to accept Emperor Ming's offer. However, the ambitious Deng Wan, believing in the same coincidence that Emperor Qianfei did regarding Liu Zixun's third-born status, rejected Emperor Ming's promotion order and prepared to resist Emperor Ming, in association with Yuan Yi (袁顗) the governor of Yong Province (雍州, modern northwestern Hubei and southwestern Henan) and Liu Zisui's chief of staff Xun Bianzhi (荀卞之). They accused Emperor Ming of being an usurper and having unduly killed, in addition to Emperor Qianfei, their brother Liu Zishang (劉子尚) the Prince of Yuzhang. Jing Province (荊州, modern central and western Hubei) and Kuaiji Commandery (the southern shore of Hangzhou Bay), governed by Liu Zixun's brothers Liu Zixu (劉子頊) the Prince of Linhai and Liu Zifang (劉子房) the Prince of Xunyang, also quickly rose in support. In spring 466, Deng Wan, claiming to have received a secret edict from Liu Zixun's grandmother Empress Dowager Lu Huinan, declared Liu Zixun emperor. Upon the declaration, nearly the entire empire declared for Liu Zixun, with Emperor Ming only in control of the region immediately around the capital Jiankang.

However, Liu Zixun's generals proceeded slowly, believing that Jiankang would collapse on its own due to the lack of food supply. Emperor Ming's general Wu Xi (吳喜) was quickly able to advance east and capture Liu Zifang, taking the commanderies around Kuaiji that had declared for Liu Zixun and securing a food supply. The troops of Liu Zixun and Emperor Ming stalemated for months in the Chaohu region, until Emperor Ming's general Zhang Xingshi (張興世) built a defense post at Qianxi (錢溪, in modern Chizhou, Anhui), upstream from Liu Zixun's main troops commanded by Yuan Yi and Liu Hu (劉胡), cutting off their food supplies. As Liu Hu then tried to capture Qianxi to reopen food routes, he was defeated by Zhang and Shen Youzhi, and Liu Hu and Yuan then fled, with their troops collapsing. Liu Hu fled back to Xunyang, but then left under guise that he was going to set up perimeter defenses while instead fleeing. Xunyang was left without a defense, and Deng Wan contemplated killing Liu Zixun to save himself, but instead was killed by another staff member Zhang Yue (張悅). Shen then arrived and executed Liu Zixun, ending his rival claim, as well as his mother Consort Chen (presumably honored as empress dowager).

== Family relations ==
- Father: Emperor Xiaowu of Song
- Mother: Consort Chen, with the rank Shuyuan (淑媛). Presumably honored as empress dowager; executed along with Zixun

Regnal titles
| Preceded by Liu Ziye | Emperor of Liu Song (Most regions); 7 Feb - 19 Sep 466 | Succeeded by Emperor Ming of Song |
