= Lu Huinan =

- Empress Dowager Chongxian (崇憲太后); Grand Empress Dowager
- Born: 412
- Died: 24 February 466 (aged 53–54)
- Spouse: Emperor Wen of Song
- Issue: Emperor Xiaowu of Song
Names
- Family name: Lu (路); Given name: Huinan (惠男)
Posthumous name
- Empress Dowager Zhaohuang (昭皇太后)

Lu Huinan (Chinese: 路惠男; 412 – 24 February 466), formally Empress Dowager Zhao (昭太后, literally "accomplished empress dowager"), semi-formally Empress Dowager Chongxian (崇憲太后), was an empress dowager of the Chinese Liu Song dynasty. She had been a concubine of Emperor Wen, and she became empress dowager because her son Liu Jun later became emperor (as Emperor Xiaowu).

== As imperial consort ==
Lu Huinan came from a humble background, and her father appeared to have been a servant to the powerful Wang clan (descendants of the Jin prime minister Wang Dao). Her brother Lu Daoqing (路道庆) definitely was a Wang clan servant. She grew up in the Jin and Liu Song capital Jiankang, and she was selected as an imperial consort for Emperor Wen, for her beauty. She had one son, Liu Jun the Prince of Wuling, but was not otherwise favored by Emperor Wen, and as Liu Jun grew and became rotated as a provincial governor throughout his father's reign, Consort Lu often accompanied Liu Jun to the provinces rather than stay in the palace. She also raised another son of Emperor Wen, Liu Yu the Prince of Xiangdong, whose mother Shen Rongji (沈容姬) had died early. After she had given birth to Liu Jun, she carried the rank of Shuyuan (淑媛), the fifth rank for imperial consorts.

== As empress dowager ==
In 453, after Emperor Wen's oldest son Liu Shao, the Crown Prince had assassinated Emperor Wen and taken the throne himself, Liu Jun rose against his brother from his defense post at Jiang Province (江州, modern Jiangxi and Fujian) and headed east to attack the capital Jiankang. Consort Lu remained at the capital of Jiang Province, Xunyang (尋陽, in modern Jiujiang, Jiangxi) and did not accompany her son on his campaign. Later in the year, after he had defeated and killed Liu Shao and taken the throne himself as Emperor Xiaowu, he had his brother Liu Hong (劉宏) the Prince of Jianping escort both her and his wife Princess Wang Xianyuan to Jiankang. Emperor Xiaowu honored his mother as empress dowager. Because Emperor Xiaowu often stayed in his mother's bedchambers, rumors grew that he was having an incestuous affair with his mother, but there was no conclusive evidence of such an affair.

Empress Dowager Lu occasionally involved herself in her son's administration, and her nephews Lu Qiongzhi (路瓊之), Lu Xiuzhi (路休之), and Lu Maozhi (路茂之) became honored, although not particularly powerful, officials. On one occasion in 458, Lu Qiongzhi visited the noble Wang Sengda (王僧達), a descendant of Wang Dao, and he sat on Wang's bench—which Wang then ordered thrown out, because he felt dishonored that Lu Qiongzhi, a son of one of the Wangs' servants, would sit on his bench. Lu Qiongzhi informed Empress Dowager Lu of this and, angry that her family was being disrespected, she told her son to punish Wang. At this time, there was a rebellion led by Gao Du (高闍), and Emperor Xiaowu therefore falsely accused Wang of being Gao's supporter, and had him arrested and forced to commit suicide.

There were only two additional historical references to Empress Dowager Lu during her son's reign. In 460, when her daughter-in-law Empress Wang presided over a ceremony where Empress Wang personally fed mulberry leaves to silkworms to show the imperial household's attention to farming, Empress Dowager Lu was present. In 461, when Emperor Xiaowu toured South Yu Province (南豫州), she accompanied him.

== As grand empress dowager and Empress Dowager Chongxian ==
In July 464, Emperor Xiaowu died and was succeeded by his son Liu Ziye, who took the throne as Emperor Qianfei. He honored his grandmother as grand empress dowager, and made her niece Lady Lu empress on 16 December 465. She did not appear to have much influence over her impulsive and cruel grandson, who was assassinated in a coup d'etat in January 466. The mutineers supported Emperor Xiaowu's younger brother Liu Yu, whom Empress Dowager Lu had raised, as Emperor Ming.

Initially, the imperial officials, who apparently viewed Empress Dowager Lu in low esteem, wanted to have her empress dowager title stripped, and for her to be moved out of the palace. Because Liu Yu was raised by her, however, he instead had her be given the title Empress Dowager Chongxian (because she lived at Chongxian Palace) and continued to have her treated as empress dowager. She died in February 466.

However, how Empress Dowager Lu died is a matter of controversy. Historical accounts indicate that there was a rumor, allegedly from reliable sources but not conclusive, that after her grandson Liu Zixun, the Prince of Jin'an had been declared emperor in early 466 at his defense post at Jiang Province in competition with Emperor Ming, Empress Dowager Lu was secretly pleased. On a feast she hosted for Emperor Ming, she spiked the wine with poison and intended to kill Emperor Ming. However, Emperor Ming's attendants realized this and warned him, and he instead offered the wine back to her. She could not refuse it, so she drank the wine and died.

Empress Dowager Lu was buried with honors due an empress dowager. However, after her burial, her body was disinterred as a magical means of cursing her grandson Liu Zixun. It was only in 468, long after Liu Zixun had been defeated, that she was reburied.
