= Liu Ziye =

Liu Ziye 劉子業
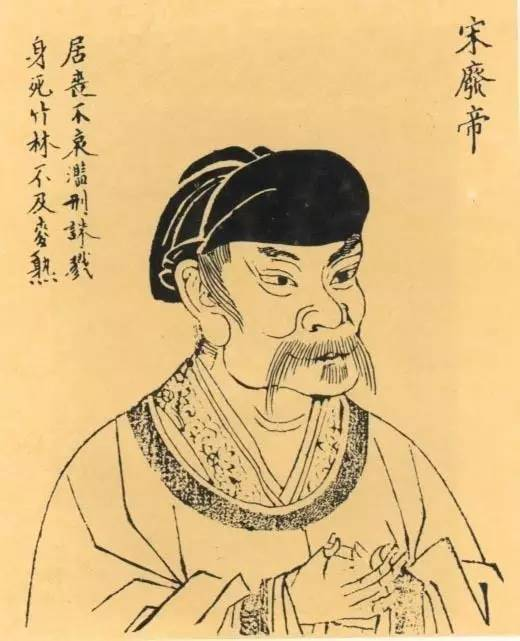

Emperor of Liu Song
- Reign: 12 July 464 – 1 January 466
- Predecessor: Emperor Xiaowu
- Successor: Emperor Ming
- Born: Liu Fashi (劉法師); 25 February 449
- Died: 1 January 466 (aged 16); Jiankang, Liu Song
- Consorts: Empress Xian (He Lingwan); Lady Lu
Names
- Family name: Liú (劉); Given name: Zǐyè (子業); Childhood name: Fǎshī (法師)
Era dates
- Yǒngguāng (永光): 465; Jǐnghé (景和): 465
Posthumous name
- None, "Qián Fèi" (前廢, lit. "former deposed") traditionally used as alternative
- Father: Emperor Xiaowu
- Mother: Empress Wenmu

Former Deposed Emperor of Liu Song or Qianfeidi ((劉)宋前廢帝; 25 February 449 – 1 January 466), personal name Liu Ziye (劉子業), childhood name Fashi (法師), was the sixth emperor of the Liu Song dynasty of China. His brief reign as a teenager was known for his violent and impulsive acts, including the slaughter of many high-level officials and his sexually immoral behavior. He was assassinated less than 18 months after becoming emperor.

== Background ==
Liu Ziye was born in 449, when his father Liu Jun was still the Prince of Wuling under his grandfather Emperor Wen. His mother Princess Wang Xianyuan and Liu Jun married in 443. While his father was rotated through several provincial governorships, Liu Ziye remained at the capital Jiankang, and was imprisoned by his uncle Liu Shao. After Liu Shao assassinated Emperor Wen and assumed the throne himself in 453, Liu Jun rose to oppose him. Liu Shao considered executing Liu Ziye but did not do so. Later that year, once Liu Jun had defeated and killed Liu Shao and taken the throne as Emperor Xiaowu, Liu Ziye was rescued from captivity, and on 13 March 454 was appointed as crown prince.

On 17 February 456, Emperor Xiaowu married He Lingwan (何令婉), a daughter of his official He Yu (何瑀), to Liu Ziye as crown princess. In 458, Emperor Xiaowu set up a household for Crown Prince Ziye, at a separate palace as was customary for crown princes. In 460, he gave a public reading of the Xiao Jing, and on 28 October 463 he assumed adult clothing. During his years as a crown prince, he was said to be constantly making mistakes and often drew rebukes from Emperor Xiaowu, causing him to be resentful to both Emperor Xiaowu and his younger brother Liu Ziluan (劉子鸞) the Prince of Xin'an, whom Emperor Xiaowu at times considered replacing Liu Ziye with (as by this time, Emperor Xiaowu also greatly favoured Liu Ziluan's mother Lady Yin). However, the official Yuan Yi (袁顗) praised him for his studiousness, and this stopped Emperor Xiaowu from the idea of replacing Liu Ziye with Liu Ziluan. On 24 October 461, He Lingwan passed away; the couple were not recorded to have any children.

In July 464, Emperor Xiaowu died, and Liu Ziye took the throne with the era name Yongguang. When the official Cai Xingzong (蔡興宗) offered the imperial seal to him, he took it with an arrogant and careless attitude, without any expression of sadness, and Cai commented to others that this was a bad sign for his reign. On 31 August 464, he honored his grandmother Empress Dowager Lu as grand empress dowager, and his mother Empress Wang as empress dowager.

== Reign ==
Upon assuming the throne, apparently because of his resentment toward his father Emperor Xiaowu, the new emperor immediately ordered that all of Emperor Xiaowu's changes to the laws established during his grandfather Emperor Wen's reign be rescinded. Another sign of his resentment toward Emperor Xiaowu could be seen in that after he commissioned new imperial portraits for the ancestral temples, he went to look at them. Upon seeing the founder (his great-grandfather) Emperor Wu's portrait, he commented, "He was a great hero who captured several emperors." Upon seeing Emperor Wen's portrait, he commented, "He was also pretty good, but it was unfortunate he lost his head to his son." Upon seeing Emperor Xiaowu's portrait, he, displeased, made the comment, "He had such a big nose from overdrinking. Where was the nose?" and he ordered that the portrait be redrawn to exaggerate Emperor Xiaowu's nose.

Late in 464, Empress Dowager Wang grew extremely ill, and she summoned Liu Ziye to see her. He refused, stating that in sick people's rooms there would be ghosts, and he could not go. In anger, she told her servant girls, "Bring a sword and cut me open, to see how it is this animal came out of me!" She soon died.

In the imperial administration, his granduncle Liu Yigong (劉義恭) the Prince of Jiangxia was the highest-ranked official, and other high-level officials included Yan Shibo (顔師伯) and Liu Yuanjing (柳元景). However, initially, actual power was held by Emperor Xiaowu's close associates Dai Faxing (戴法興) and Chao Shangzhi (巢尚之). Dai often curbed Liu Ziye's impulsive actions, warning him about the fate of his granduncle Emperor Shao, who was deposed and killed because of his incompetence. In fall 465, Liu Ziye ordered Dai to commit suicide and relieved Chao of his posts. These actions shocked the high-level officials, and Liu Yuanjing and Yan planned to depose Liu Ziye and support Liu Yigong as the replacement emperor. When Liu consulted with the general Shen Qingzhi (沈慶之), Shen, who had no prior friendship with Liu Yigong and was resentful of disrespect by Yan, exposed them. As a result, just 12 days after forcing Dai to commit suicide, Liu Ziye personally led the imperial guards to attack and kill Liu Yigong and his four sons. Liu Yuanjing and Yan, and their sons, were all killed as well. Liu Ziye gave orders to cut off Liu Yigong's limbs, cut his abdomen open, and pulled out the entrails to be cut to pieces. He also gouged out Liu Yigong's eyes and put them in honey, calling them "pickled ghost eyes." From this point on, the people that Liu Ziye trusted included Yuan Yi, Xu Yuan (徐爰), Shen, his brother Liu Zishang (劉子尚) the Prince of Yuzhang, and his sister Liu Chuyu the Princess Kuaiji. In an action that was considered highly immoral at the time, upon Princess Chuyu's pronouncement that it was unfair that the emperor could have thousands of concubines but she could only have one husband, Liu Ziye selected 30 handsome young men and gave them to her to serve as her lovers. Still resentful of his brother Liu Ziluan, Liu Ziye not only forced Liu Ziluan to commit suicide, but also killed Liu Ziluan's mother Consort Yin's other two children, Liu Zishi (劉子師) the Prince of Nanhai and a sister of theirs.

At this time, Liu Ziye also stated that he wanted to get a chance to declare a state of emergency. When his uncle Liu Chang (劉昶) the Prince of Yiyang and governor of Xu Province (徐州, modern northern Jiangsu and northern Anhui) requested permission to return to Jiankang, he falsely accused Liu Chang of planning a rebellion, and sent Shen Qingzhi to command troops against Liu Chang. In fear, Liu Chang initially tried to resist, but when he saw he could not, he fled to Northern Wei.

Meanwhile, in the winter of 465, Liu Ziye continued his killing streak. He had been carrying on an incestuous relationship with his aunt Liu Yingmei (劉英媚) the Princess Xincai, and, resolved to keep her as a concubine, killed a lady-in-waiting and delivered her body to Liu Yingmei's husband He Mai (何邁, who was also his brother-in-law), informing him that his wife had died. He Mai knew what the truth was, and, not able to bear this humiliation, considered deposing the emperor and making his brother Liu Zixun the Prince of Jin'an emperor. The plot was leaked, and Liu Ziye personally attacked He and killed him. When Shen Qingzhi tried to urge the emperor to change his ways in light of what happened with He Mai, Liu poisoned him. Meanwhile, Liu created Grand Empress Dowager Lu Huinan's niece Lady Lu as empress on 16 December 465

Liu Ziye was very suspicious of his uncles—that they would rebel against him—so he gathered them in Jiankang and put them under house arrest in his palace. He often battered them and treated them as less than human. He, in particular, put Liu Yu the Prince of Xiangdong, Liu Xiuren (劉休仁) the Prince of Jian'an, and Liu Xiuyou (劉休祐) the Prince of Shanyang, all of whom were overweight, into cages and measured their weight as if weighing pigs. He referred to Liu Yu as the Prince of Pigs, Liu Xiuren as the Prince of Murderers, and Liu Xiuyou as the Prince of Thieves. Because another uncle, Liu Hui (劉褘) the Prince of Donghai, was considered obstinate and unintelligent, he referred to Liu Hui as the Prince of Donkeys. He often wanted to kill Liu Yu, Liu Xiuren, and Liu Xiuyiu, but each time Liu Xiuren flattered him and caused him to change his mind. In one particular incident, he tied Liu Yu up like how a pig would be tied up, and had him delivered to the kitchen, stating, "Today is pig-killing day." Liu Xiuren, however, stated, "This is not the pig-killing day." He angrily asked Liu Xiuren why that was the case, and Liu Xiuren stated, "After your son is born, then kill the pig and take out his entrails!" Liu Ziye liked Liu Xiuren's joke and did not kill Liu Yu.

Fearful that he would be assassinated, Liu Ziye entrusted the defense of the palace to a number of fierce warriors, including Zong Yue (宗越), Tan Jin (譚金), Tong Taiyi (童太一), and Shen Youzhi.

Liu Ziye also saw his brother Liu Zixun as a threat—particularly because he saw that Emperor Wen, Emperor Xiaowu, and Liu Zixun were all third sons of their fathers. He therefore used the He Mai plot as an excuse, sending his attendant Zhu Jingyun (朱景雲) to deliver poison to Liu Zixun to force him to commit suicide, but as Zhu approached Liu Zixun's defense post at Xunyang (尋陽, in modern Jiujiang, Jiangxi), he intentionally slowed down and leaked the news. Liu Zixun's assistant Deng Wan (鄧琬) then had an opportunity to declare a rebellion, although at this stage Deng was not yet declaring Liu Zixun an emperor. (Note: Deng Wan only proclaimed Liu Zixun to be emperor after Emperor Ming's accession.)

At the same time, Liu Ziye continued his immoral behavior. He summoned the princesses to the palace and ordered them to lie down and allow his attendants to have sexual intercourse with them. When his aunt Princess Dowager Jiang of Nanping, the wife of his deceased uncle Liu Shuo (劉鑠), refused, he had her whipped. He had her three sons, Liu Jingyou (劉敬猷) the Prince of Nanping, Liu Jingxian (劉敬先) the Prince of Luling, and Liu Jingyuan (劉敬淵) the Marquess of Annan put to death. He also ordered his ladies in waiting to strip and chase each other naked. When one lady in waiting refused, he beheaded her. That night, he dreamed of a woman cursing him, "You are so violent and immoral that you will not live to see the wheat harvest next year." After he woke up, he found a lady in waiting whose appearance was similar to the woman he saw in the dream, and beheaded her. He then had another dream in which the executed lady in waiting cursed him. He therefore decided to hold a ghost-killing ceremony the next night.

At the ceremony, one of the emperor's attendants, Shou Jizhi (壽寂之), who had often been rebuked by Liu Ziye and who had entered into a plot with a number of people to assassinate him, unleashed his conspirators and surrounded the emperor. Liu tried to flee, but was unable to, and Shou killed him. He was buried with his deceased wife, Crown Princess He (Empress Xian), who was his first cousin. Liu Yu took the throne as Emperor Ming.

== Consorts ==
- Empress Xian, of the He clan of Lujiang (獻皇后 廬江何氏; 445–461), first cousin once removed, personal name Lingwan (令婉)
- Empress, of the Lu clan (皇后 路氏), first cousin once removed
- Noble Imperial Concubine Xie, of the Xie clan (謝貴嬪 謝氏)
- Lady of Virtue, of the Yang clan (良娣 羊氏)
- Lady of Treasure, of the Yuan clan (保林 袁氏)

== Depictions in Popular Culture ==
- Portrayed by Zhang Yijie in Untouchable Lovers (2018)

== Notes ==
Chinese royalty
Preceded by Emperor Xiaowu of Song	Emperor of Liu Song (Jiankang region); 464–465	Succeeded by Emperor Ming of Song
Preceded by Emperor Xiaowu of Song	Emperor of Liu Song (Most regions); 464–465	Succeeded by Liu Zixun
