= Liu Song dynasty =

Chinese ruling dynasty from 420 to 479

Song 宋
- 420–479 AD
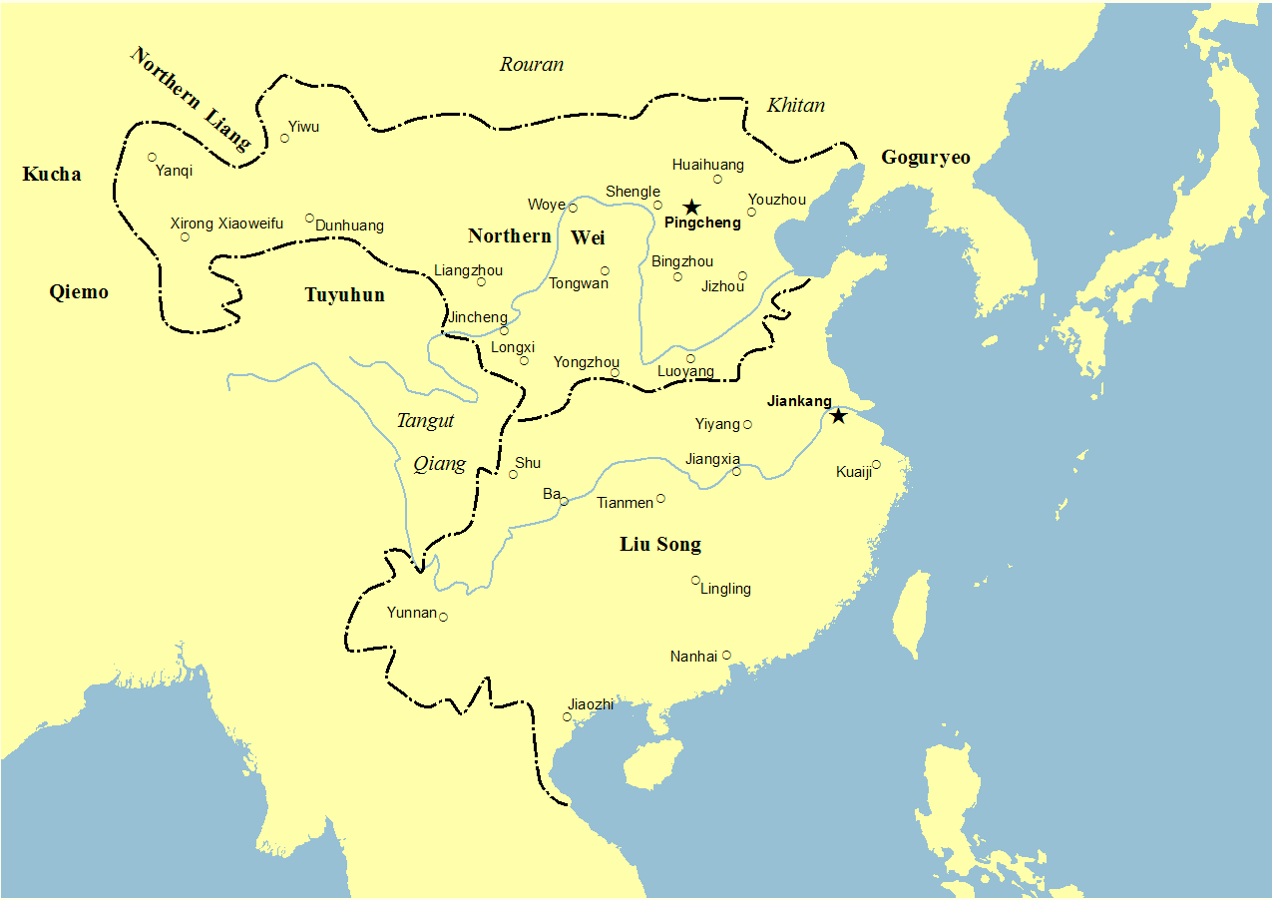
- Liu Song and neighbors

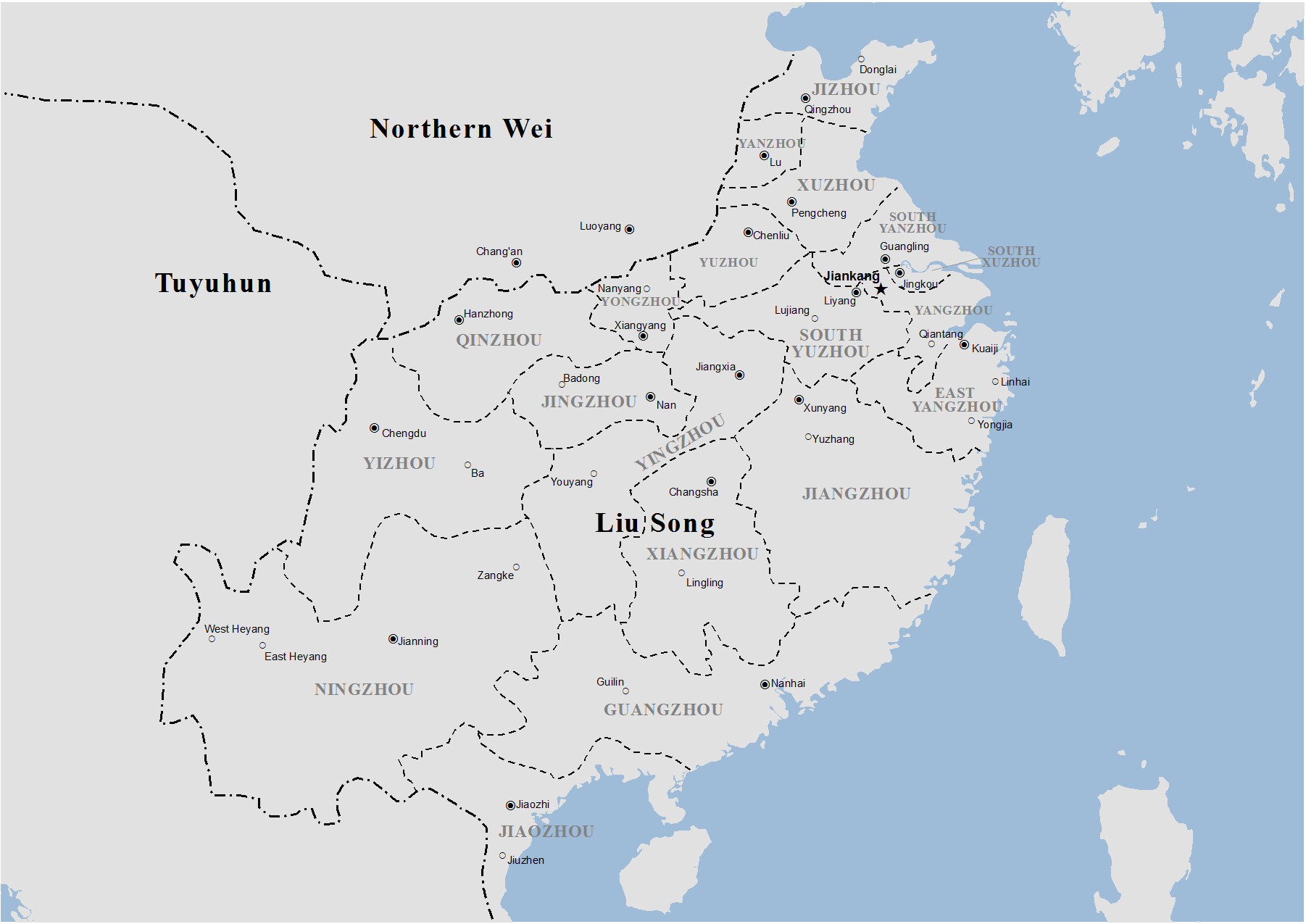
- Administrative divisions of Liu Song
- Capital: Jiankang
- Government: Monarchy
- Emperor
  - 420–422: Emperor Wu
  - 424–453: Emperor Wen
  - 453–464: Emperor Xiaowu
  - 465–472: Emperor Ming
  - 473–477: Emperor Houfei
  - 477–479: Emperor Shun
- History
  - Established: 10 July 420
  - Disestablished: 31 May 479 AD
- Currency: Chinese coin, Chinese cash
Preceded by	Succeeded by
Eastern Jin	Southern Qi
- Today part of: China; Myanmar; Vietnam

Song, known as Liu Song (Chinese: 劉宋), Former Song (前宋) or Song of (the) Southern dynasties (南朝宋) in historiography, was an imperial dynasty of China and the first of the four Southern dynasties during the Northern and Southern dynasties period. It succeeded the Eastern Jin dynasty and preceded the Southern Qi dynasty.

The dynasty was founded by Liu Yu (Emperor Wu; 363–422 AD), whose surname together with "Song" forms the common name for the dynasty, the "Liu Song". This appellation is used to distinguish it from a later dynasty of the same name, the Song dynasty (960–1279 AD, ruled by the House of Zhao). Although the Liu Song has also at times been referred to as the "Southern Song", the name is now mainly used to refer to the Song dynasty after 1127 AD.

The Liu Song dynasty was a time of much internal turmoil. A number of emperors were incompetent and/or tyrannical, and were met with military revolts. These rulers include Liu Shao, Emperor Xiaowu, Liu Ziye, Emperor Ming, and Liu Yu. Emperor Ming was especially cruel, murdering many of his brothers, nephews, and other male relatives — many of them children. Such internal instability eventually led to the dynasty's destruction. However, its founder Emperor Wu was considered one of the greatest generals during the Northern and Southern dynasties period, and the reign of its third emperor, Emperor Wen, is known for its political stability and capable administration, not only of its emperor but its strong and honest officials. This is known as the Reign of Yuanjia (425–453 AD) and one of the relative golden ages for the Southern Dynasties.

== History ==
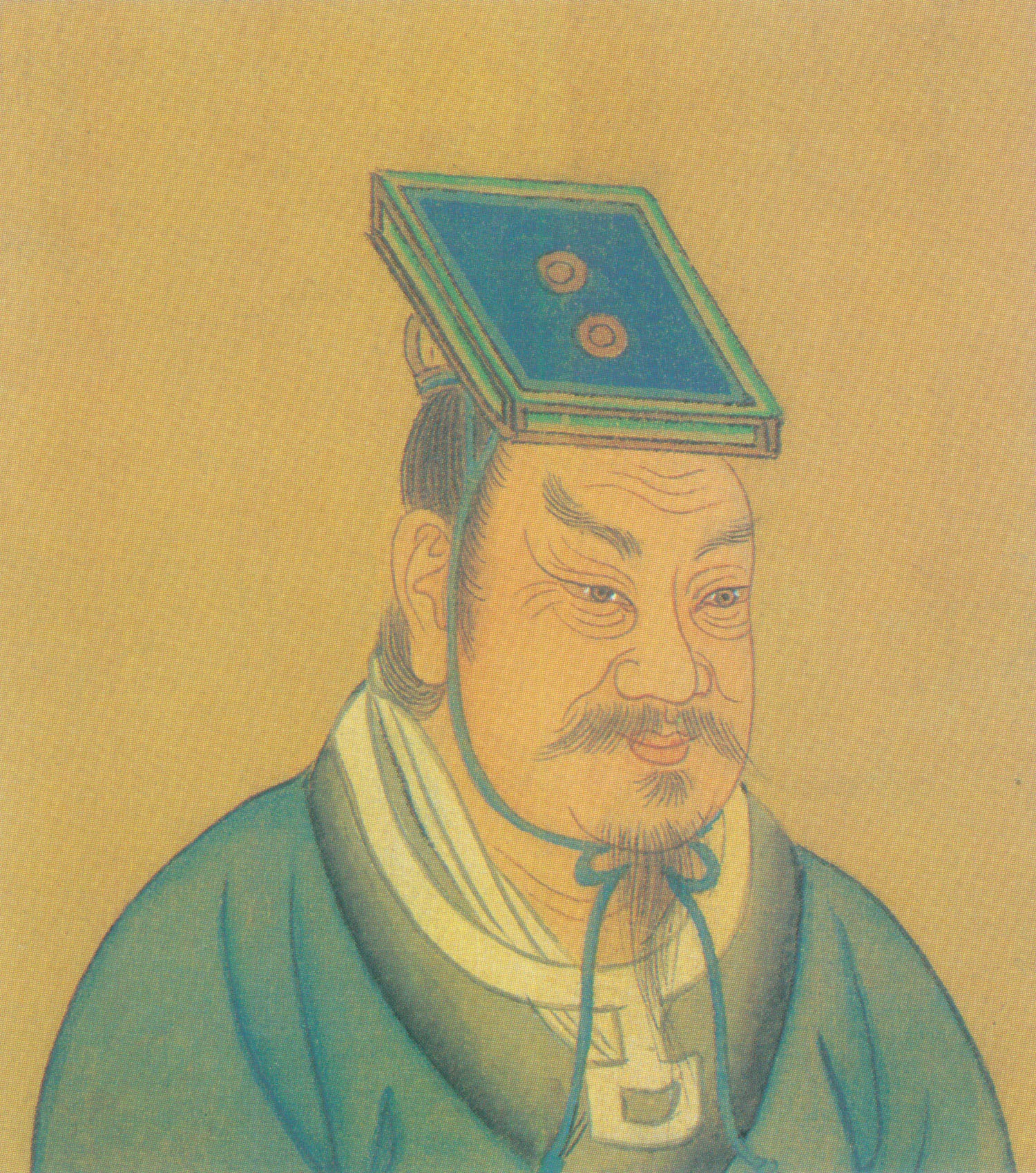
Liu Yu, Emperor Wu of Liu Song

=== Rise of Liu Yu ===
Liu Yu was born in poverty. He joined the army at a young age, quickly distinguished himself in the army. In 399, he joined a campaign against a Five Pecks of Rice rebellion led by Sun Tai (孫泰) and Sun En (孫恩). In 404, Liu Yu was instrumental in fighting an usurpation by the general Huan Xuan. After Huan Xuan's fall, Liu Yu was quickly promoted to the command of an army, the Beifu corps. He then led the Jin army during the conquests of Southern Yan and Later Qin.

=== Campaigns of Liu Yu ===
Regarded as one of the best generals of the Northern and Southern dynasties, Liu Yu started off by reclaiming much of the territory the Chinese had lost during the Sixteen Kingdoms era. He started off his career by campaigning against Southern Yan, which bordered Jin to the north and had adopted a policy of aggression and kidnapping citizens from the Jin. By spring of 410, he had captured the southern Yan capital at Guanggu, ending Southern Yan.

Afterwards, he campaigned against western Shu in modern Sichuan. Using a brilliant military manoeuver mentioned in the Art of War, Liu Yu instructed his generals to attack the capital of Shu by the Min River rather than the short route by the Fu river. Surprising the Shu forces, he quickly captured Chengdu and re-annexed that area back into Jin.

Following the death of the Later Qin Emperor Yao Xin, Liu Yu attacked the state of Later Qin, which controlled the valuable lands of Guanzhong, lands which had once housed the capital of the Qin, Han and Jin dynasties before the barbarian uprisings. After defeating the Later Qin army in several battles, as well as an army of Northern Wei troops which had crossed to assist the Later Qin, Liu Yu recaptured the vital cities of Chang'an and Luoyang, the former capitals of the Jin Empire. It is recorded that he engaged the Wei army by the use of spears launched by crossbows, panicking the Wei cavalry and allowing him to score a decisive victory.

After this success, it seemed that Jin would exterminate the remaining barbarian states in the north and reunify China. However, fortunes began to change for the Jin forces. Liu Mengzhi died and in order to secure his power, Liu Yu left for Jiankang (present-day Nanjing), abandoning the management of the North to his general Wang Zhen'e. After his departure, the state of Xia attacked Guanzhong and reoccupied it, and the loss of these lands prescribed Jin's frontier at the Yellow River. However, Jin retained its former eastern capital, Luoyang, as well as most of the Chinese heartland.

In 419, following his return to Jiankang, Liu Yu had Emperor An of Jin strangled and replaced by his brother Sima Dewen, posthumously known as Emperor Gong. Finally, in 420, Sima Dewen abdicated in favour of Liu Yu, who declared himself the ruler of the new Song dynasty. The name of the dynasty was taken from Liu's fief, which occupied roughly the same territory as the Spring & Autumn era State of Song. The Book of Song does not mention whether the Liu family had any blood relationship to the ancient state's ruling House of Zi, or by extension to the Shang dynasty. It is in any case noteworthy that Liu did not frame his new regime as a restoration of the Han dynasty, despite being demonstrably related to the Han imperial family. Liu died in 422 CE, and was succeeded by the incompetent Shaodi, who was quickly removed. His eventual successor would be his third son, Wendi.

== Reign of Emperor Wen ==
Under Emperor Wen, the Liu Song economy prospered during the rule of Yuanjia (Chinese: 元嘉之治), a period noted for its prosperity in the 400 years of conflict between the Han and Tang dynasties. However, the emperor's martial abilities were not equal to his father, and his inability to crush the remaining barbarian states allowed Northern Wei to complete the unification of the North, to the detriment of Liu Song. Afterwards, Northern Wei would remain a grave and permanent threat to the Liu Song.

=== War with Northern Wei ===
Emperor Wen continued the campaigns of his father; nevertheless, he was unsuccessful. In 422 CE, the first year of his reign, he lost three commanderies to Wei. Under the able general Dao Yanzhi, however, Liu Song recovered the four cities of Luoyang, Hulao, Huatai and Qiao'ao south of the Yellow River. However, the emperor's unwillingness to advance past this line caused the destruction of the empire's ally, Xia, by the Wei. The emperor was to repeat this mistake as several barbarian states who had offered to ally with Liu Song against Wei were declined, eventually leading to Wei's unification of the North in 439 CE, to the detriment of the Chinese.

Towards the later part of his reign, Emperor Wen was less than able. He wrongfully executed the general Tan Daoji, who had hitherto commanded the Song armies, and took charge himself. The empire's decline was shown in 450 CE, where the emperor attempted to destroy the Northern Wei himself, and launched a massive invasion. Although initially successful, the campaign turned into a disaster. The Wei lured the Liu Song to cross the Yellow River, and then flanked them, destroying the Eastern army. As the Liu Song armies retreated, the provinces south of the Yellow River were devastated by the Wei army. Only Huatai, a fortified city, held out against the Wei. However, the economic damage was immense. The barbarian troops laid waste to the provinces they had temporarily occupied, as described by Sima Guang:

The Wei forces laid South Yan, Xu, North Yan, Yu, Qing, and Ji Provinces to waste. The Song deaths and injuries were innumerable. When Wei forces encountered Song young men, the forces quickly beheaded them or cut them in half. The infants were pierced through with spears, and the spears were then shaken so that the infants would scream as they were spun, for entertainment. The commanderies and counties that Wei forces went through were burned and slaughtered, and not even grass was left. When sparrows returned in the spring, they could not find houses to build nest on, so they had to do so in forests. Wei soldiers and horses also suffered casualties of more than half, and the Xianbei people were all complaining.

Sima Guang also pointed out the cause of Liu Song's disaster:

Every time Emperor Wen sent generals out on battles, he required them to follow the complete battle plans that he had drafted, and even the dates for battles needed approval from the emperor. Therefore, the generals all hesitated and could not make independent decisions. Further, the non-regular troops that he conscripted were not trained, and they rushed to advance when they were victorious and scattered when they were defeated. These were the two reasons why he failed, and from this point on, the state was in recession, and the Reign of Yuanjia was in decline.

Another historian, Shen Yue, pointed out Emperor Wen was said to model his command on the great general Emperor Guangwu of Han, but he lacked the latter's command abilities.

Emperor Wen made another attempt to destroy Northern Wei in 452, but failed again. On returning to the capital, he was assassinated by the heir apparent, Liu Shao.

== Reign of Emperor Xiaowu and Qianfei ==
Liu Shao's assassination of his father in 453 CE raised indignation across the empire, as it disobeyed one of Confucianism's fundamental principles, that of filial piety. Quickly, his brother Liu Jun rose against him, defeated him, and beheaded him. Once Liu Shao was killed. Liu Jun ascended to the throne and became Emperor Xiaowu. However, he was regarded as immoral and committed incest with his cousins and sisters, and reputed to have even done so with his mother. Nevertheless, his reign was a relatively peaceful one.

Following his death in 464 CE, Liu Jun passed his throne to his son, Liu Ziye, who was generally regarded as a tyrant. He disrespected his father and was suspicious of his uncles, putting several of them to death. He continued the incestuous streak of his father, adopting several of his aunts and cousins as concubines. He was reputed to have ordered all of the princesses to come to his palace and have sexual intercourse with him. When one of his aunts refused, he executed her three sons. He also put to death a lady-in-waiting who bore a resemblance to a woman who cursed him in a dream. Eventually, one of his uncles could not bear it, rose up, and assassinated him.

== Liu Zixun's rebellion ==
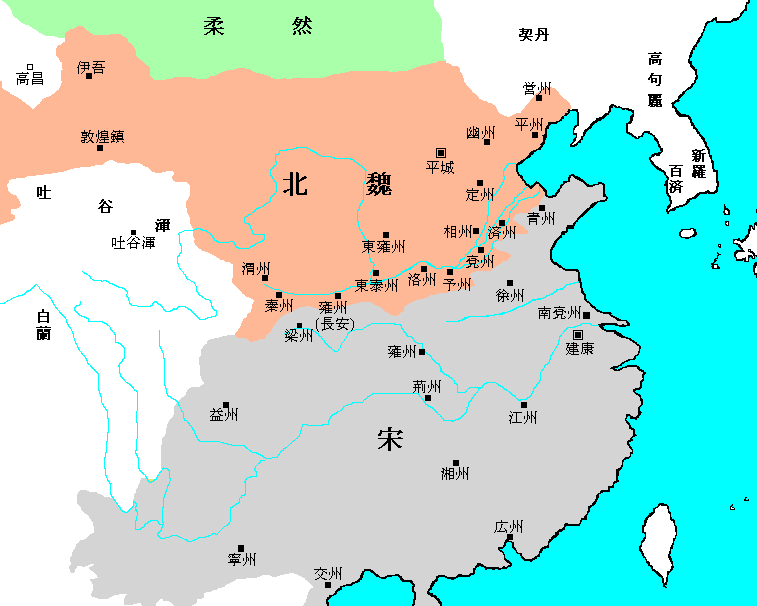
Liu Song coexisted with the Xianbei state of Northern Wei with the border at the Yellow river. That border was moved south to the Huai after the reign of Emperor Ming of Liu Song.

The man who assassinated Qianfei quickly became emperor himself and declared himself emperor Ming. He ordered Liu Ziye's brother Liu Zishang and sister Liu Chuyu, who were reputed to have participated in the late emperor's sexual immorality and tyrannical governance, to commit suicide. However, his claim to the throne was not accepted by Liu Zixun, one of his nephews, who then rose against him.

The civil war at first was a great success for Liu Zixun, who quickly overran nearly the entire empire. However, he moved too slowly. Emperor Ming quickly sent an army westward, captured Kuaiji, a vital food supply. Another of his generals captured Qianxi and cut off Liu Zixun's supplies. Starving, his troops collapsed and Liu Zixun was killed, aged just 10.

However, Emperor Ming grew arrogant and refused to grant a pardon to those who had supported Liu Ziye. This action was extremely detrimental to Liu Song and its successors, as the governors of the northern commandries, fearing their lives, surrendered to Wei rather than face execution at Jiankang. This resulted in the loss of the Chinese heartland and the most fertile and cultivated lands at that time. This loss would eventually lead to the destruction of the southern regime, and resulted in North China languishing under a barbarian yoke for another 150 years. Although Emperor Ming attempted to recover them, his attempts were defeated.

Emperor Ming's later reign was extremely brutal. Suspicious of his nephews, he had them all executed. Afraid of usurpation from rival members of the royal family, he executed thousands of members of the royal family, which was greatly weakened. Upon his death, his son had to be assisted by the general Xiao Daocheng, as nearly all of Emperor Ming's brothers and nephews had been killed.

== Fall of Liu Song ==
The successor to the emperor Ming, emperor Houfei, was resentful of the control Xiao Daocheng had over him and announced openly several times he would kill him. Fearful of his demise, Xiao had him assassinated and placed Emperor Shun on his throne. In 479, Xiao took the throne himself and declared himself Emperor of Qi, ending Liu Song. The ex-emperor Shun and his clan were soon put to the sword.

Liu Hui (刘辉) was a descendant of Liu Song royalty who fled north to the Xianbei Northern Wei in exile and married the Xianbei Princess Lanling (蘭陵公主), daughter of the Xianbei Emperor Xiaowen of Northern Wei. More than half of Tuoba Xianbei princesses of the Northern Wei were married to Han Chinese men, and half of those men are members of prominent clans or royal members of the southern courts who defected to the north.

== Literature and culture ==
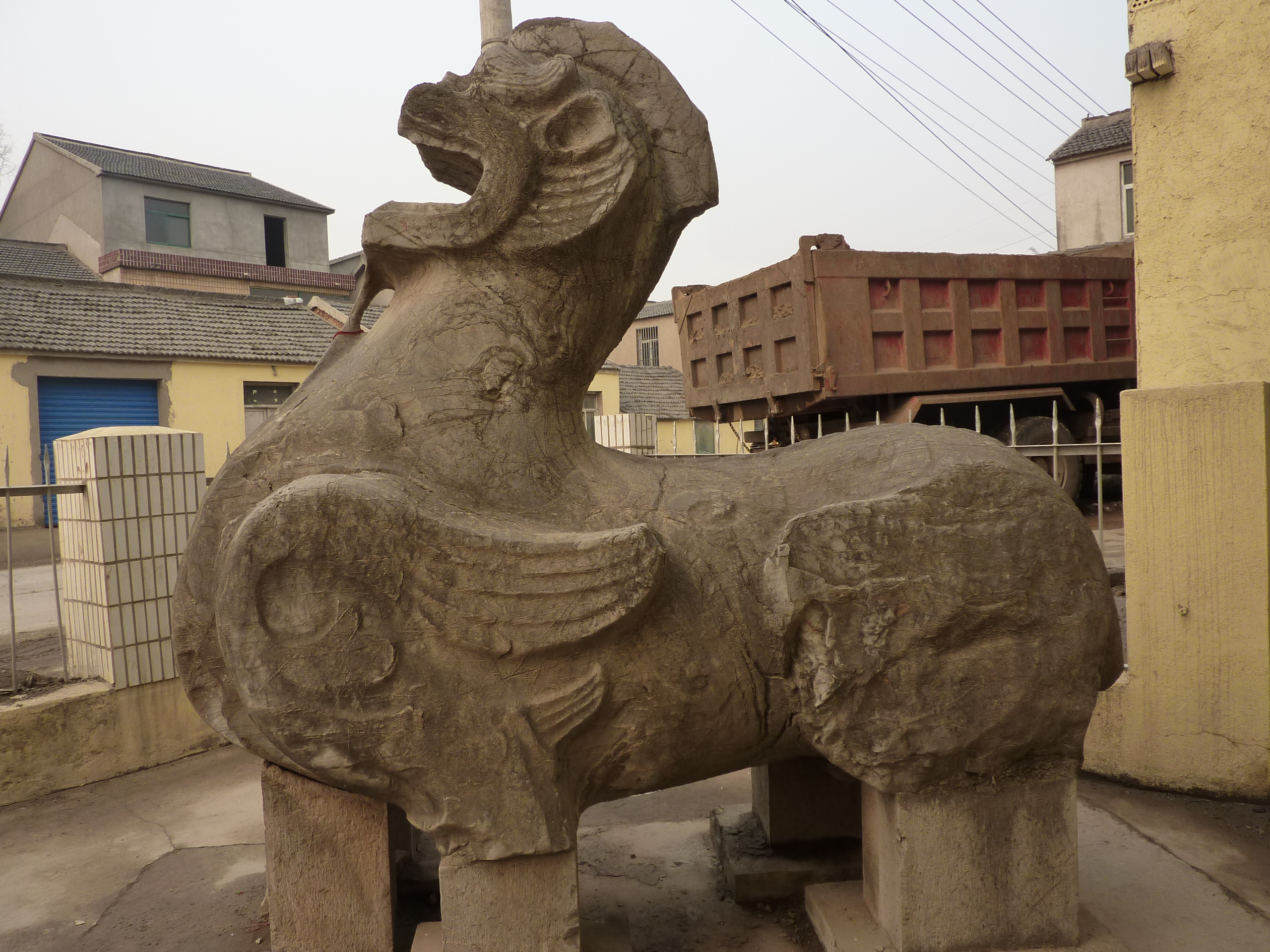
The eastern qilin of the Chuning Tomb

Despite, and certainly to some extent because of, the chaotic warfare between the Northern and Southern dynasties, the Liu Song produced much poetry (shi 詩) notably the rhapsody, fu 賦. The imperial house sponsored many literary works, and many wrote themselves. The court of Emperor Wen was especially active in literary circles, with Liu supporting the compilation of a large collection of short prose anecdotes, A New Account of the Tales of the World (Shishuo Xinyu). The "Three Giants of Yuanjia," Bao Zhao (鮑照) (d. 466), Xie Lingyun (謝霊運) (385–433 CE), and Yan Yanzhi (顏延之) (384–456 CE) are among the best known poets of the Song, each of them being credited as the originators of the three major literary trends to follow.

Scientists and astronomers were also active during periods of relative peace. Buddhism also began to be better understood and more widely practised at this time, and some officials such as Xie Lingyun, were Buddhists.

Liu Song sculptors may have created a number of spirit way ensembles, generally characteristic of the Six Dynasties era, for the tombs of the dynasty's emperors and other dignitaries. However, according to a survey of the extant Six Dynasties' sculpture in the Nanjing and Danyang areas, only one of the extant Six Dynasties' tomb sculptural groups has been securely identified as belonging to the Liu Song: the Chuning Tomb of the first emperor of the dynasty. Two qilin statues of this tomb survive in the appropriately named Qilin Town in Nanjing's suburban Jiangning District.

In 440 CE, the dynasty changed its official religion to Taoism, replacing Buddhism.

== Science ==
Zu Chongzhi, a noted astronomer, lived during the Liu Song period. He was noted for calculating pi to seven decimal places and as the author of a variety of other astronomical theories.

== Table of successions ==
Sovereigns of Liu Song dynasty (420–479 CE)
Posthumous name	Temple name	Family name and given names	Period of reigns	Era names and their according range of years
Wu, 武	Gaozu (高祖)	Liu Yu, 劉裕	420–422 CE	Yongchu (永初) 420–422
–		Liu Yifu, 劉義符	423–424 CE	Jingping (景平) 423–424
Wen, 文	Taizu (太祖) or Zhongzong (中宗)	Liu Yilong, 劉義隆	424–453	Yuanjia (元嘉) 424–453
–		Liu Shao, 劉劭	453	Taichu (太初) 453
Xiaowu, 孝武	Shizu 世祖	Liu Jun, 劉駿	453–464	Xiaojian (孝建) 454–456 CE; Daming (大明) 457–464
–		Liu Ziye, 劉子業	464–465	Yongguang (永光) 465 CE; Jinghe (景和) 465
Ming, 明	Taizong (太宗)	Liu Yu, 劉彧	465 (Note: Emperor Xiaowu's son Liu Zixun (Emperor Qianfei's brother) was declared emperor in spring 466 and received pledges of allegiance from the vast majority of provinces, but was defeated by Emperor Ming's forces and executed by Emperor Ming's general Shen Youzhi in fall 466 CE.)–472	Taishi (泰始) 465–471 CE; Taiyu (泰豫) 472
–		Liu Yu, 劉昱	473–477 CE	Yuanhui (元徽) 473–477 CE
Shun, 順	–	Liu Zhun, 劉準	477–479 CE	Shengming (昇明) 477–479 CE

== Liu Song family tree ==
Liu Song

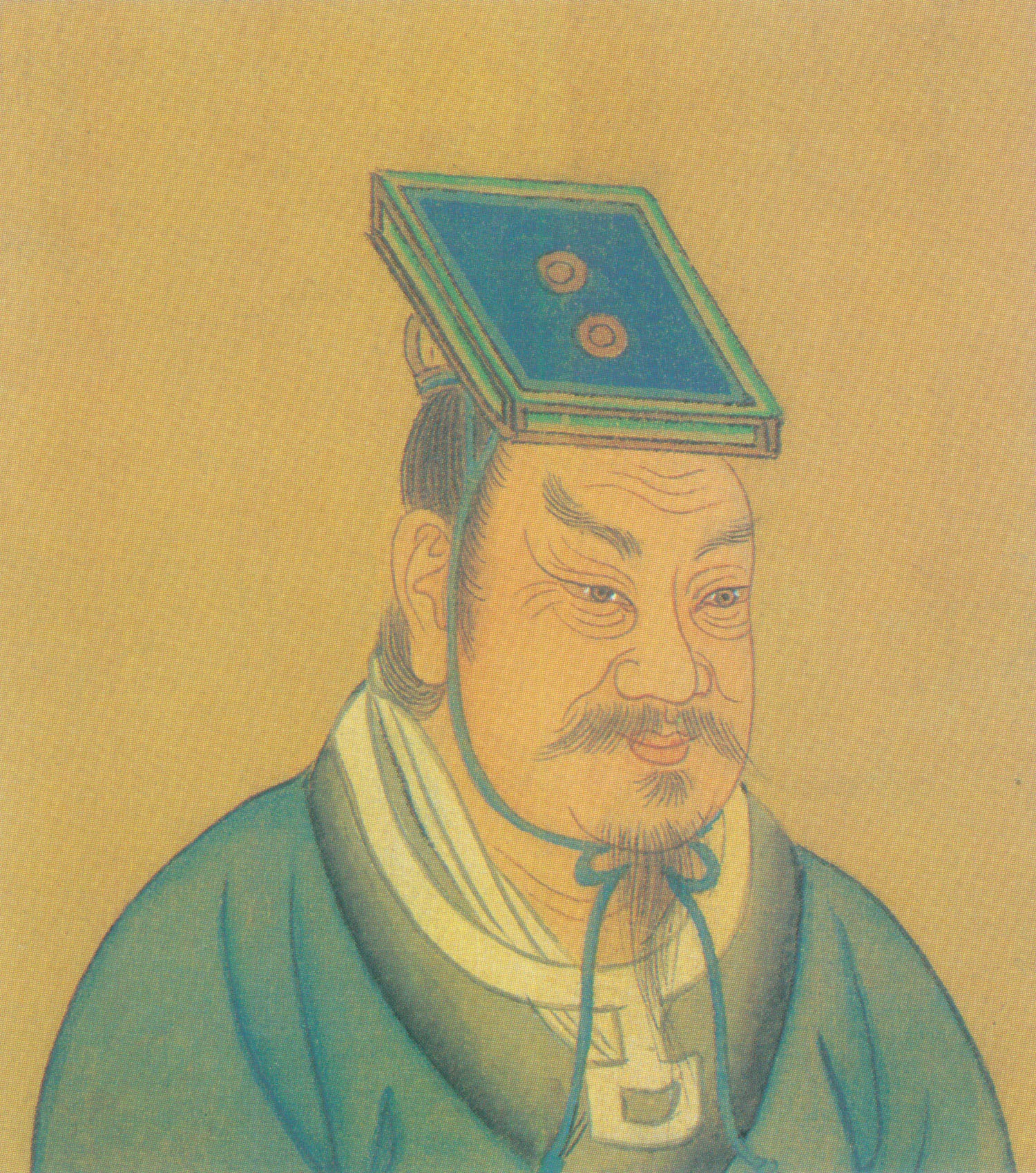
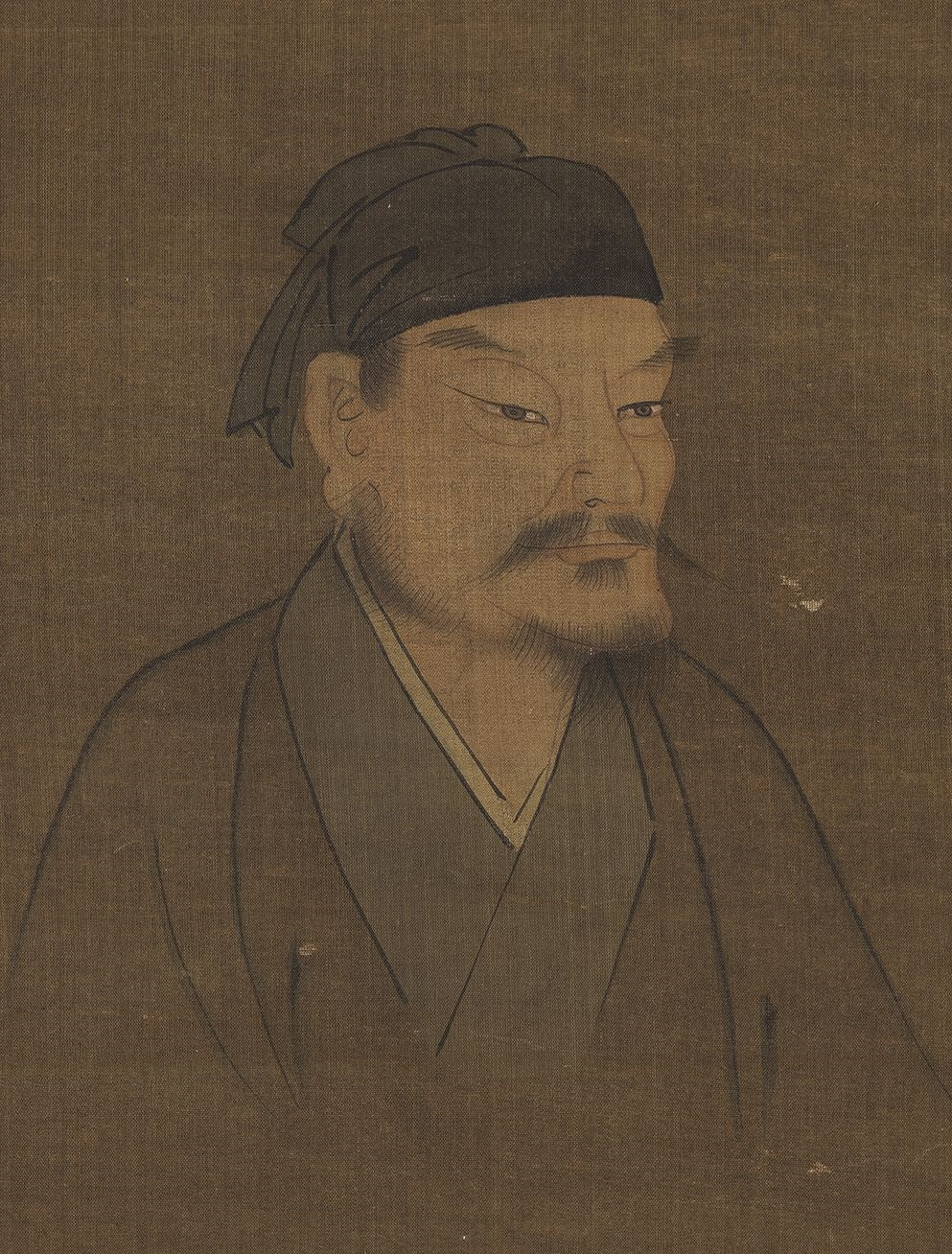
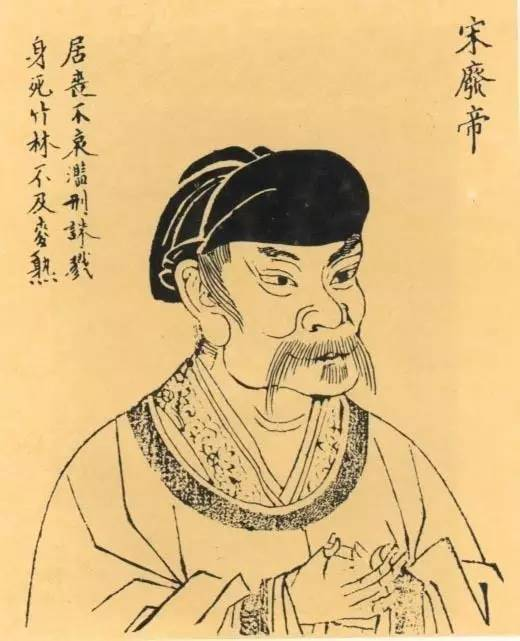
Liu Yu 劉裕 (363–422) Wudi (r. 420–422)^{1}
Liu Yifu 劉義符 (406–424); Shao (r. 423–424)^{2}	Liu Yilong 劉義隆 (407–453) Wen (r. 424–453)^{3}	Liu Yikang 劉義康 (409–451)
Liu Shao 劉劭; 426–453; r. 453^{4}	Liu Jun (430–464); Xiaowu (r. 453–464)^{5}	Liu Jun 劉濬 (429–453); Prince Shixing	Liu Yu 劉彧 (439–472); Ming (r. 465–472)^{7}	Liu Xiufan 劉休範 (448–474)
Liu Ziye 劉子業 (449–466) Qianfei (r. 464–466)^{6}	Liu Zixun (劉子勛) (456–466; r. 466)	Liu Yu (劉昱) (463–477); Houfei (r. 472–477)^{8}	Liu Zhun (劉準) (469–479); Shun (r. 477–479)^{9}

== See also ==
- Chinese sovereign
- History of China
- Six Dynasties
- Song dynasty
- Southern and Northern Dynasties
- List of Bronze Age States
- List of Classical Age States
- List of Iron Age States
- List of pre-modern great powers
