= Wu Mingche =

Wu Mingche (Chinese: 吳明徹; c. 504/512 – 24 August 580), courtesy name Tongzhao (通昭), was a Chinese military general and politician of the Chen dynasty of China. He first served under the dynasty's founder Emperor Wu but became the most prominent general of the state during the reign of Emperor Wu's nephew Emperor Xuan, successfully commanding the Chen army in seizing the region between the Yangtze River and the Huai River from the Northern Qi dynasty. After the Northern Qi was conquered by the Northern Zhou dynasty, however, Wu was defeated and captured by the Northern Zhou general Wang Gui (王軌). After he was taken to the Northern Zhou capital Chang'an, he died in anger.

== During Liang Dynasty ==
Wu Mingche was born in 512, as the youngest son of the Liang dynasty general Wu Shu (吳樹). His grandfather Wu Jing'an (吳景安) was a commandery governor during and preceding Southern Qi dynasty. His family was from Qin Commandery (秦郡, roughly the part of modern Nanjing, Jiangsu, north of the Yangtze River). Despite the fact that Wu Jing'an was a general, the family was not wealthy, and when Wu Jing'an died in 525 when Wu Mingche was 13, it was said that the family could not afford a proper burial. Wu Mingche, despite his young age, worked hard on the family farm, and eventually, partly because of his hard work, the family was able to gather enough funds to bury Wu Jing'an properly.

When Wu Mingche grew older, he served as an officer in the guard corps for Emperor Wu of Liang's crown prince, Xiao Gang. When the general Hou Jing rebelled and sieged the capital Jiankang in 548, Wu Mingche appeared to be at his home in Qin Commandery, which, as a result of trade routes' being cut off, suffered from a famine. Wu had grains stored, but rather than keeping the grains for his own clan, he persuaded his older brothers that the grain should be shared with the local people, allowing the people to survive.

Hou soon captured Jiankang, and was not defeated until 553, by Wang Sengbian, a general under the command of Emperor Wu's son Xiao Yi the Prince of Xiangdong, who soon declared himself emperor (as Emperor Yuan). Wang Sengbian's lieutenant Chen Baxian was put in charge of the important city Jingkou (京口, in modern Zhenjiang, Jiangsu). When Chen put out a general invitation for people to join his army, Wu met him. Chen was impressed with his abilities and treated him with respect. It was also around this time that Wu studied histories and other classical works, as well as astronomy and strategies from the official Zhou Hongzheng (周弘正). In 554, Emperor Yuan made him a provincial governor, but he continued to serve under Chen's command.

In winter 554, Western Wei launched a major attack on Emperor Yuan's capital Jiangling (江陵, in modern Jingzhou, Hubei). Emperor Yuan made an emergency summon to Wang, then in charge of Jiankang, ordering him to come to Jiangling's aid. Wu was one of the generals named by Wang to command part of his troops. However, before Wang could even mobilize his troops, Jiangling fell, and around the new year 555, Western Wei forces put Emperor Yuan to death. Wang and Chen subsequently prepared to make Emperor Yuan's son Xiao Fangzhi the Prince of Jin'an emperor, but when Northern Qi attacked and Wang's forces suffered losses against Northern Qi, Wang accepted the proposal of Emperor Wenxuan of Northern Qi to make Emperor Wu's nephew Xiao Yuanming emperor instead, and he declared Xiao Yuanming emperor in summer 555. Displeased with Wang's decision, Chen made a surprise attack on Jiankang in fall 555, killing Wang and deposing Xiao Yuanming. Chen declared Xiao Fangzhi emperor (as Emperor Jing). Subsequently, when generals loyal to Wang resisted Chen, aided by Northern Qi, Wu served under Zhou Wenyu in the campaign against Wang's son-in-law Du Kan (杜龕) and Zhang Biao (張彪), and later participated in a key battle defending Jiankang in 556. For his contributions in the two campaigns, he was created the Marquess of Anwu.

In 557, Chen had Emperor Jing yield the throne to him, establishing the Chen Dynasty as Emperor Wu. Wu Mingche continued to serve as a general in the new dynasty's military.

== During Emperor Wu's and Emperor Wen's reigns ==
Immediately prior to taking the throne, Emperor Wu had sent Zhou Wenyu and another major general, Hou Andu, west against Wang Lin, an independent general still claiming loyalty to Liang, and Wu was one of the generals who served under Zhou and Hou. When Wang subsequently defeated the Chen troops, capturing Zhou and Hou as well as three other generals, Xu Jingcheng (徐敬成), Zhou Tiehu (周鐵虎), and Cheng Lingxi (程靈洗), Wu was not captured, and was able to take his forces back to Jiankang. Subsequently, Wu was assigned to operations in the modern Jiangxi region to defend against a possible attack from Wang (who had by this point declared Emperor Yuan's grandson Xiao Zhuang Emperor of Liang) as well as to keep the local warlords in check.

In 559, Emperor Wu died and was succeeded by his nephew Chen Qian the Prince of Linchuan (as Emperor Wen). Wang, upon hearing of Emperor Wu's death, decided to attack Chen, and Wu Mingche made an attempt to intercept Wang at Pencheng (湓城, in modern Jiujiang, Jiangxi), but was defeated by Wang's general Ren Zhong (任忠). Wu barely escaped with his life, allowing Wang to continue his advance toward Jiankang. Wang, however, was subsequently defeated by Hou Tian, and both he and Xiao Zhuang were forced to flee to Northern Qi. As part of Chen's effort to then take control of Xiao Zhuang's territory, Emperor Wen assigned Wu to be the governor of Wu Province (武州, roughly modern Changde, Hunan), but he was defeated by the Northern Zhou (Western Wei's successor state) general Heruo Dun (賀若敦) and forced to withdraw to Baling (巴陵, in modern Yueyang, Hunan). He was, however, able to defeat further Northern Zhou advance there.

In 562, when the warlord Zhou Di (周迪), who controlled parts of modern Jiangxi, rebelled, Wu was made the governor of Jiang Province (江州, roughly modern Jiujiang), to command the army against Zhou. However, the strict Wu was unable to get his subordinate generals to obey his orders, and Emperor Wen subsequently sent his brother Chen Xu the Prince of Ancheng to replace Wu. In 564, Emperor Wen made Wu the governor of Wuxing Commandery (吳興, roughly modern Huzhou, Zhejiang) -- an apparent demotion, but as Emperor Wen pointed out, actually an important position because Wuxing was the imperial Chen clan's home commandery. When Emperor Wen grew ill in 566, he recalled Wu to serve as the commanding general of the palace guards. Emperor Wen died later that year and was succeeded by his son, the Crown Prince Chen Bozong (as Emperor Fei).

== During Emperor Fei's reign ==
Initially during Emperor Fei's reign, the government was controlled by, pursuant to Emperor Wen's will, the high-level officials Dao Zhongju (到仲舉), Kong Huan (孔奐), Emperor Wen's brother Chen Xu, Yuan Shu (袁樞), and Liu Shizhi (劉師之). However, by spring 567, two factions were developing—one led by Chen Xu and one led by Dao and Liu, as Dao, Liu, and Chen Xu took up residence in the palace and handled most of the sensitive matters. In spring 567, Liu tried to exclude Chen Xu by having the official Yin Buning (殷不佞) informing Chen Xu that he should leave the palace to attend to the affairs of the capital region Yang Province (揚州), of which Chen Xu was also governor. Chen Xu consulted Mao Xi (毛喜) and Wu Mingche, both of whom persuaded him not to follow Yin's message. Wu, specifically, argued that Chen Xu was in the position of the Duke of Zhou and the Duke of Shao (uncles and regents to King Cheng of Zhou) and had a responsibility to protect the state. Chen Xu therefore invited Liu to a meeting—and while the meeting was still going on, had Mao confirming with Empress Dowager Shen and Emperor Fei that it was not their order that he leave the palace. Once Mao confirmed so, Chen Xu arrested Liu and ordered him to commit suicide, while demoting Dao to a lesser position. From this point on, the administration was controlled by Chen Xu. Dao later tried to start an uprising with the general Han Zigao (韓子高), but the plot was discovered, and Chen Xu forced both of them to commit suicide.

As both Dao and Han were trusted associates of Emperor Wen, another trusted associate of Emperor Wen, Hua Jiao (華皎) the governor of Xiang Province (湘州, roughly modern Changsha, Hunan) became apprehensive, and he prepared for a battle with Chen Xu, requesting aid from both Northern Zhou and Emperor Ming of Western Liang—a Liang Dynasty prince who claimed title to the Liang throne as a Northern Zhou vassal. In summer 567, Chen Xu commissioned Wu as the governor of Xiang Province and had him command a major part of the troops against Hua, along with general Chunyu Liang (淳于量). The opposing sides met at Dunkou (沌口, in modern Wuhan, Hubei). Wu and Chunyu were able to ram Hua's, Northern Zhou's, and Western Liang's fleets, causing them to collapse. Hua and the Northern Zhou general Yuwen Zhi (宇文直) were forced to flee to Western Liang's capital Jiangling. In light of the victory, Wu first captured Western Liang's Hedong Commandery (河東, part of modern Jingzhou), and then further put Jiangling under siege. Western Liang's Emperor Ming was forced to flee to the subsidiary fort of Ji'nan (紀南, near Jiangling). Wu sieged Jiangling for 100 days but could not capture it and had to withdraw in spring 568. For his contributions, he was promoted to the greater title of Duke of Anwu.

In winter 568, Chen Xu deposed Emperor Fei, and in spring 569, he took the throne himself (as Emperor Xuan). Wu continued to serve as a general in Emperor Xuan's military.

== During Emperor Xuan's reign ==
In 573, Emperor Xuan wanted to launch a campaign against Northern Qi to capture the region between the Yangtze River and the Huai River. The officials that he discussed with had diverse opinions, but Wu Mingche was the one who advocated quick action. Emperor Xuan decided to carry out attack, and because Chunyu Liang was the senior general, most officials believed that he should command the mission. Xu Ling (徐陵), however, advocated making Wu the commanding general, pointing out that Wu was a good general and that his family was from north of the Yangtze and therefore he was familiar with the customs of the region. Emperor Xuan therefore put Wu in charge of the main assault, while putting the general Huang Fachu (name not in Unicode) in charge of the secondary front. Wu quickly captured his home commandery (Qin Commandery). Northern Qi sent forces commanded by the general Wei Pohu (尉破胡) to try to stop Wu's advance, but Wu's subordinate Xiao Mohe defeated a group of Northern Qi's best warriors, leading to the Northern Qi army's collapse. Most of the territory south of the Huai River was quickly captured, and as Qin Commandery was Wu's home commandery, Emperor Xuan, in order to honor him, ordered him to publicly offer a sacrifice of an ox, a pig, and a sheep to his ancestors. By fall 573, Wu had the important city of Shouyang (壽陽, in modern Lu'an, Anhui), defending by Wang Lin, under siege, and although he could not capture it quickly, he did when the Northern Qi relief force commanded by Pi Jinghe (皮景和) arrived but was hesitant to engage him. He captured Wang, Lu Qian (盧濳), Kezhuhun Daoyu (可朱渾道裕), and Li Taotu (李騊駼). Pi fled, and Wu captured his horses and camels. Because many of Wu's officers were Wang's subordinates and respected him, Wu became apprehensive and executed Wang, delivering the other Northern Qi officials to Jiankang. The region between the Yangtze and the Huai was now entirely in Chen hands, and Emperor Xuan created Wu the greater title of Duke of Nanping. He also put Wu in charge of the six provinces making up of the region. (In order to confer the honors on Wu, he had a high platform built near Shouyang and had Wu ascend the platform to accept these honors, and the entire army felt honored on Wu's account.)

In winter 575, Wu launched an attack on Pengcheng (彭城, in modern Xuzhou, Jiangsu). However, he appeared to soon withdraw. In 576, he was made the governor of Southern Yan Province (南兗州, roughly modern Yangzhou, Jiangsu).

In 577, Northern Zhou destroyed Northern Qi and took over its territory. In winter 577, Emperor Xuan, believing that Northern Zhou's hold on Northern Qi's southern provinces was not yet secure, ordered Wu to launch a major attack on Pengcheng, making Wu's heir apparent Wu Rongzhao (吳戎昭) his lieutenant. Initially, Wu defeated the Northern Zhou governor of Xu Province (徐州, roughly modern Xuzhou) Liang Shiyan (梁士彥), forcing Liang to withdraw inside Pengcheng and defend it. Wu put Pengcheng under siege. In spring 578, the Northern Zhou general Wang Gui (王軌) arrived with a force to lift the siege, and he, as his first step, cut off Wu's supply route (and escape path). Xiao Mohe advised Wu to attack Wang as quick as he could to prevent the supply route from being cut off, but Wu did not follow Xiao's suggestion. Soon, the Chen forces were trapped.

Wu's subordinates suggested destroying the levee near Pengcheng so that the area would flood, allowing them to escape by ships. Wu agreed, but believing that he, as the commanding general, should withdraw last, did so, sending Xiao with the cavalry first. The cavalry was therefore able to escape, but most of the foot soldiers—30,000—and Wu himself were captured by Wang on 20 March 578 and taken to the Northern Zhou capital Chang'an. Emperor Wu of Northern Zhou created Wu the Duke of Huaide, but Wu, angry over his capture, died soon thereafter.

It appeared that because Wu Mingche was captured and not killed in action, his titles and offices were stripped by Emperor Xuan. After Emperor Xuan's death, Emperor Xuan's crown prince and successor Chen Shubao posthumously created Wu the Marquess of Shaoling in 583 and allowed his younger son Wu Huijue (吳惠覺) to inherit the title. (The fact that the title was not inherited by Wu Rongzhao implied that Wu Rongzhao was probably also captured by Northern Zhou forces or died without issue.)
