= Hou Andu =

Chinese Chen dynasty general (520-563)

Hou Andu (Chinese: 侯安都; pinyin: Hóu Āndū; Cantonese Yale: Hau4 On1 Dou1) (520 – 6 July 563), courtesy name Chengshi (成師), was a Chen dynasty general, whose military accomplishments under Emperor Wu and Emperor Wen made him one of the most powerful individuals in the state, but whose arrogance and rudeness raised suspicions from Emperor Wen, and Emperor Wen arrested him and forced him to commit suicide.

== During Liang Dynasty ==
=== Hou Andu gains prominence ===
Hou Andu came from a prominent clan of Shixing Commandery (始興, roughly modern Shaoguan, Guangdong). In his youth, he was known for being skilled at calligraphy, playing the qin, riding, and archery. When the rebel general Hou Jing (no relation) attacked the capital Jiankang and captured it in 549, the local general Chen Baxian decided to try to raise an army to try to assist in recovering Jiankang. Hou Andu gathered 3,000 men and joined Chen's army. He, as one of Chen's three key lieutenants (along with Du Sengming and Zhou Wenyu) subsequently assisted Chen in his campaigns against local warlords Cai Luyang (蔡路養) and Li Qianshi (李遷仕), and, when Chen served as the lieutenant of Emperor Yuan's general Wang Sengbian in 552 in defeating Hou Jing and recapturing Jiankang with contribution from Hou Andu, Emperor Yuan awarded Hou Andu with a general title and created him as the Viscount of Fuchuan.

=== Supporting Chen Baxian ===
In 554, Western Wei attacked Emperor Yuan's new capital Jiangling (江陵, in modern Jingzhou, Hubei), capturing it, and Western Wei forces put Emperor Yuan to death around the new year 555. Initially, Wang and Chen prepared to declare Emperor Yuan's only surviving son Xiao Fangzhi the Prince of Jin'an emperor, but after Wang's forces suffered defeats by Northern Qi forces, Wang accepted the proposal by Emperor Wenxuan of Northern Qi to declare Emperor Yuan's cousin Xiao Yuanming emperor. Chen, then stationed at Jingkou (京口, in modern Zhenjiang, Jiangsu), was displeased with Xiao Yuanming's elevation and, in fall 555, upon hearing rumors that Northern Qi may attack, decided to overthrow Wang and Xiao Yuanming.

In doing so, he consulted only with Hou, Zhou, and Xu Du (徐度), and then launched a surprise attack on Jiankang under the guise that he was only making troop movements to defend against a possible Northern Qi attack. However, as the army departed, Chen hesitated, and only followed the army after Hou chased him down and told him, "Today, we are all prepared to be bandits. Why hesitate? Do you think that your hesitation can save you from decapitation?"

Chen thereafter resolved to launch the attack, and Wang was caught by surprise when Hou entered his headquarters at the fortress of Shitou, near Jiankang. Wang was unable to resist, and Hou captured him. Chen put Wang to death and deposed Xiao Yuanming, declaring Xiao Fangzhi emperor (as Emperor Jing). Subsequently, when Chen was away from Jiankang to attack Wang's son-in-law Du Kan (杜龕), Hou and Du Leng (杜稜) were left in charge of the capital, and Hou fended the capital against a surprise attack by the generals Xu Sihui (徐嗣徽) and Ren Yue (任約), who were loyal to Wang. When Northern Qi sent forces to aid Xu and Ren, Chen returned to the capital and commissioned Hou to defend against Northern Qi attacks. After Hou repelled Northern Qi forces, the armies stalemated, and around the new year 556, Northern Qi forces sued for peace.

=== Hou Andu is sent against Hou Tian but returns ===
Meanwhile, Hou Tian, the governor of Jiang Province (江州, modern northern Jiangxi) also resisted Chen, and Chen sent Hou Andu and Zhou against Hou Tian. However, as they were departing Jiankang, Northern Qi prepared another attack in spring 556, and they had to be diverted to defend against Northern Qi again. Hou Andu was effective in resisting Northern Qi attacks. Northern Qi forces subsequently reached Jiankang's vicinity, and Hou Andu, seeing the situation as critical, fought against the wind (even though doing so was against military principles at the time) and was able to fight off Northern Qi forces. Eventually, when Northern Qi forces ran out of food supplies, Chen's armies crushed them. For Hou Andu's contributions, Chen initially promoted him to marquess, and then further created him the Duke of Xijiang.

=== Hou is sent as a peacemaker ===
In spring 557, when Xiao Bo (蕭勃) the Marquess of Qujiang and governor of Guang Province (廣州, modern central Guangdong) declared an uprising against the Chen-led imperial administration, Chen initially sent only Zhou to fight Xiao Bo's forces. After Zhou crushed and captured Xiao Bo's general Ouyang Wei (歐陽頠), however, Xiao Bo's own generals assassinated him, throwing Guang Province into a state of confusion. Chen, because Ouyang was an old friend of his, made Ouyang the governor of Guang Province and sent Hou south to assist Zhou to pacify the region. They defeated Xiao Bo's generals Xiao Zi (蕭孜) and Yu Xiaoqing (余孝頃), and soon pacified the region.

Meanwhile, also resisting Chen was the general Wang Lin, who controlled the modern Hunan and part of modern Hubei region. In summer 557, Chen sent Hou and Zhou to attack Wang.

== During Emperor Wu's reign ==
=== Hou Andu is captured ===
However, before Hou Andu and Zhou Wenyu could engage Wang Lin's forces, Chen Baxian had Emperor Jing yield the throne to him in winter 557, establishing Chen Dynasty as its Emperor Wu. When the news reached Hou and Zhou's forces, which had captured Wuchang (武昌, in modern Ezhou, Hubei) from Wang's general Fan Meng (樊猛), Hou lamented, "We will surely be defeated, because we have lost our cause." (He was referring to that ostensibly, his and Zhou's forces had been launched against Wang because Wang was rejecting Emperor Jing's edicts—but now, Emperor Wu had himself overthrown Emperor Jing, and therefore lost any ability to refer to Wang as a rebel.) Hou and Zhou's forces were also beset by disagreements between the two of them. When they eventually engaged Wang's at Dunkou (沌口, in modern Wuhan, Hubei), Wang dealt them a crushing defeat—so completely that both Hou and Zhou, as well as their lieutenants Xu Jingcheng (徐敬成), Zhou Tiehu (周鐵虎), and Cheng Lingxi (程靈洗), were all captured. Wang put Zhou Tiehu, who insulted him, to death, while imprisoning the others, including Hou, in a lower deck on his own command ship.

They remained in Wang's captivity until winter 558, when Hou, along with Zhou Wenyu and Xu, promised to pay Wang's associate Wang Zijin (王子晉) a large bribe, and Wang Zijin released them at night. They fled. on foot, to the Chen army and then returned to Jiankang, where they offered apologies to Emperor Wu. Emperor Wu pardoned them and returned them to command positions in the Chen forces. Meanwhile, perhaps because of this incident, Wang Lin, who had by that point declared Emperor Yuan's grandson Xiao Zhuang the Emperor of Liang, agreed to a truce with Chen.

=== Hou defeats Cao ===
In winter 558, with Yu Xiaoqin's brother Yu Xiaomai (余孝勱) defending Xinwu (新吳, in modern Yichun, Jiangxi) against Chen, Emperor Wu sent Zhou against Yu Xiaomai, while sending Hou to follow Zhou subsequent to Zhou's departure. Wang sent his general Cao Qing (曹慶) to assist Yu, and in spring 559, Zhou was ambushed by the warlord Xiong Tanlang (熊曇朗), who was ostensibly assisting Chen troops. Hou withdrew briefly, but then engaged Cao and defeated him.

== During Emperor Wen's reign ==
=== Hou Andu supports Chen Qian ===
While Hou Andu was still on the campaign, however, Emperor Wu suffered a sudden illness in summer 559 and soon died, creating a succession crisis—as Emperor Wu's only surviving son, Chen Chang, was then detained by Western Wei's successor state Northern Zhou at its capital Chang'an. Emperor Wu's wife Empress Zhang Yao'er, after consulting Du Leng and Cai Jingli (蔡景歷), kept Emperor Wu's death a secret and summoned Emperor Wu's nephew Chen Qian the Prince of Linchuan from Nanhuan (南皖, in modern Anqing, Anhui), where Chen Qian was building a fortress. Hou happened to be at Nanhuan at the time as well, and so he returned to Jiankang with Chen Qian. Hou, after discussing the matter with other officials, decided to support Chen Qian as emperor, but Empress Zhang was still hesitant, hoping that Chen Chang, her son, would return. Hou stated, "Now, the four corners of the world have not been pacified; how can we wait for an imperial prince from afar? The Prince of Linchuan had had great contributions to the state, and we support him. Anyone who dares not to speak up should be executed." He even proceeded toward Empress Zhang, with his hand on his sword hilt, requesting her to yield the imperial seal. He further pushed Chen Qian to the position where the imperial heir was supposed to stand for the wake. Only then did Empress Zhang issue an edict having Chen Qian take the throne (as Emperor Wen).

In winter 559, after hearing that Emperor Wu had died, Wang Lin, with Northern Qi assistance, launched a major attack on Chen, hoping to destroy it and reestablish Liang. Emperor Wen sent Hou Tian (who had, after initial resistance, submitted to Chen), Hou Andu, and Xu Du against Wang. In spring 560, Wang was defeated by Hou Tian, and both he and Xiao Zhuang fled to Northern Qi; the territory under their control was divided between Chen and Emperor Xuan of Western Liang, whom Northern Zhou supported. (The degree of Hou Andu's involvement in the victory is unclear.)

=== Hon Andu as a royal escort ===
Wang's defeat, however, precipitated another succession crisis. After news of Emperor Wu's death reached Northern Zhou, Northern Zhou had sent Chen Chang back to Chen, but because his way was blocked by the territory under Xiao Zhuang's control, he was forced to stop at Anlu (安陸, in modern Xiaogan, Hubei). After Xiao Zhuang's flight to Northern Qi, Chen Chang continued his journey to the Yangtze River—and on his way, he wrote impolite letters to Emperor Wen, which Emperor Wen took as a demand for the throne. Emperor Wen, displeased, nevertheless put on a calm face and summoned Hou Andu, telling him, "The Crown Prince is about to return. I will retire and ask for a princely domain." Hou replied, "Ever since ancient times, emperors were not allowed to retire. Although I am foolish, I will not accept this edict." He thereafter requested to personally escort Chen Chang, and Emperor Wen sent him to meet Chen Chang and created Chen Chang the Prince of Hengyang. Once Hou Andu met Chen Chang, he escorted him down the Yangtze River, and on the way, had Chen Chang killed and thrown into the Yangtze. He then returned to Jiankang, announcing that Chen Chang had slipped and fallen into the river. Grateful that Hou had eliminated a rival for him, Emperor Wen created Hou the Duke of Qingyuan—going from being the duke of a county to the duke of a commandery.

Because of Hou Andu's contributions, at some point during Chen Dynasty (but unclear when), his father Hou Wenhan (侯文捍) had been made the governor of his home commandery, Shixing. In summer 560, when Hou Wenhan died, Emperor Wen sent imperial messengers to escort Hou Andu's mother back to Jiankang, but she declined, as she preferred to stay at Shixing. To honor the Hous, Emperor Wen carved out the surrounding region into an Eastern Heng Province and made Hou Andu's cousin Hou Xiao (侯曉) its governor, while making Hou Andu's eight-year-old son Hou Mi (侯秘) the commandery governor, to look after Hou Andu's mother. He also created Hou Andu the Duke of Guiyang, an even larger commandery than Qingyuan.

In winter 560, with Hou Tian in a stalemate against the Northern Zhou generals Heruo Dun (賀若敦) and Dugu Sheng (獨孤盛), trying to seize the modern Hunan region from Northern Zhou and its vassal Western Liang, Emperor Wen sent Hou Andu to assist Hou Tian. By spring 561, however, without apparent involvement by Hou Andu, Hou Tian was able to negotiate an agreement with Heruo to have him yield the territory to Chen, in exchange for guarantee of safe passage for his troops back to Northern Zhou.

In winter 561, Emperor Wen, wanting to force the warlord Liu Yi (留異), who controlled modern eastern Zhejiang, to submit, sent Hou Andu against Liu. In spring 562, Hou surprised Liu by taking his army over the mountain and descending on Liu's stronghold of Dongyang (東陽, in modern Jinhua, Zhejiang). When Hou tried to besiege Liu's fortress at Taozhi Mountain (桃枝嶺, in modern Lishui, Zhejiang), he was wounded by an arrow, but nevertheless continued his assault and defeated Liu. Liu fled to Jin'an (晉安, in modern Fuzhou, Fujian), to his son-in-law Chen Baoying (陳寶應). Hou took Liu's territory and returned to Jiankang. (Subsequently, the other generals were able to defeat Chen Baoying and another warlord, Zhou Di (周迪), largely integrating their territories into direct imperial control.)

In the meantime, however, Hou, because of his contributions, was growing arrogant and rude, much to Emperor Wen's displeasure, although Emperor Wen's displeasure went unnoticed by Hou. His officers, knowing that Hou would protect them, had largely ignored laws, and whenever they were sought on criminal matters, they would flee to Hou and go unpunished. When attending imperial gatherings, Hou would often take impolite postures, and once, while attending an imperial feast, he asked Emperor Wen, "How do you feel compared to when you were the Prince of Linchuan?" Emperor Wen initially refused to answer, but after Hou asked again, he responded, "Although it was by the will of Heaven, it is also by your contributions." Upon the completion of the feast, Hou asked that the imperial decorations be lent to him for his own feast, and Emperor Wen, while displeased, agreed. The next day, Hou held his feast, while sitting on the same seat Emperor Wen sat on, while his guests sat at the seats that imperial officials sat on—acts that Emperor Wen could not tolerate, and his anger was exacerbated when a fire occurred at Chongyun Palace (重雲宮) -- and Hou, while trying to command the soldiers to put out the fire, entered the palace in full armor. Emperor Wen thus became resolved to act against Hou.

Therefore, when Zhou Di officially rebelled in winter 562, although the imperial officials largely recommended that Hou be put in command of the troops against Zhou, Emperor Wen sent Wu Mingche instead, and further began to investigate Hou's protection of criminals. Hou began to sense that something was wrong, and he sent his assistant Zhou Hongshi (周弘實) to try to get information from the Cai Jingli. Cai recorded details of Zhou Hongshi's contact and secretly accused Hou of planning a rebellion. Emperor Wen, worried that if he simply summoned Hou that Hou would refuse, issued an edict transferring Hou from being the governor of Southern Xu Province (南徐州, roughly modern Zhenjiang, Jiangsu) to being the governor of Jiang Province. Hou, believing this to be a routine transfer, stopped at Jiankang before going to Jiang Province. Emperor Wen invited him to a feast and arrested him there; he also arrested Hou's officers, but released them after confiscating their horses and weapons. Emperor Wen then issued an edict announcing Hou's crimes, and the next day ordered Hou to commit suicide, but spared his wife and children and buried Hou at imperial expense. In 571, Emperor Wen's brother Emperor Xuan posthumously created Hou the Marquess of Chenji and allowed his son Hou Dan (侯亶) to inherit the title.

Traditional historians believe that Hou's (and Zhou Wenyu's) fate were foretold by Chen Baxian. According to their accounts, while Chen was still a Liang general defending Jingkou, he once held a feast with his officers. Du Sengming, Zhou, and Hou were all bragging about their contributions. Chen responded:

You are all great soldiers of this time, but you all have weaknesses as well. Lord Du has great foresight but insufficient wisdom; you engage in foolish games with your subordinates and are proud to your superiors. Lord Zhou is true to friends, but you are not selective in whom you associate with, and you are overly trusting of others. Lord Hou is overly arrogant and does not know when to stop, and you are frivolous and temperamental. These are not ways to protect your lives.

(If this account was true, Chen was not accurate about Du, who died honorably of natural causes, albeit before the establishment of Chen Dynasty.)
