= Emperor Wen of Chen =

Emperor of the Chen dynasty from 559 to 566

Emperor Wen of Chen 陳文帝
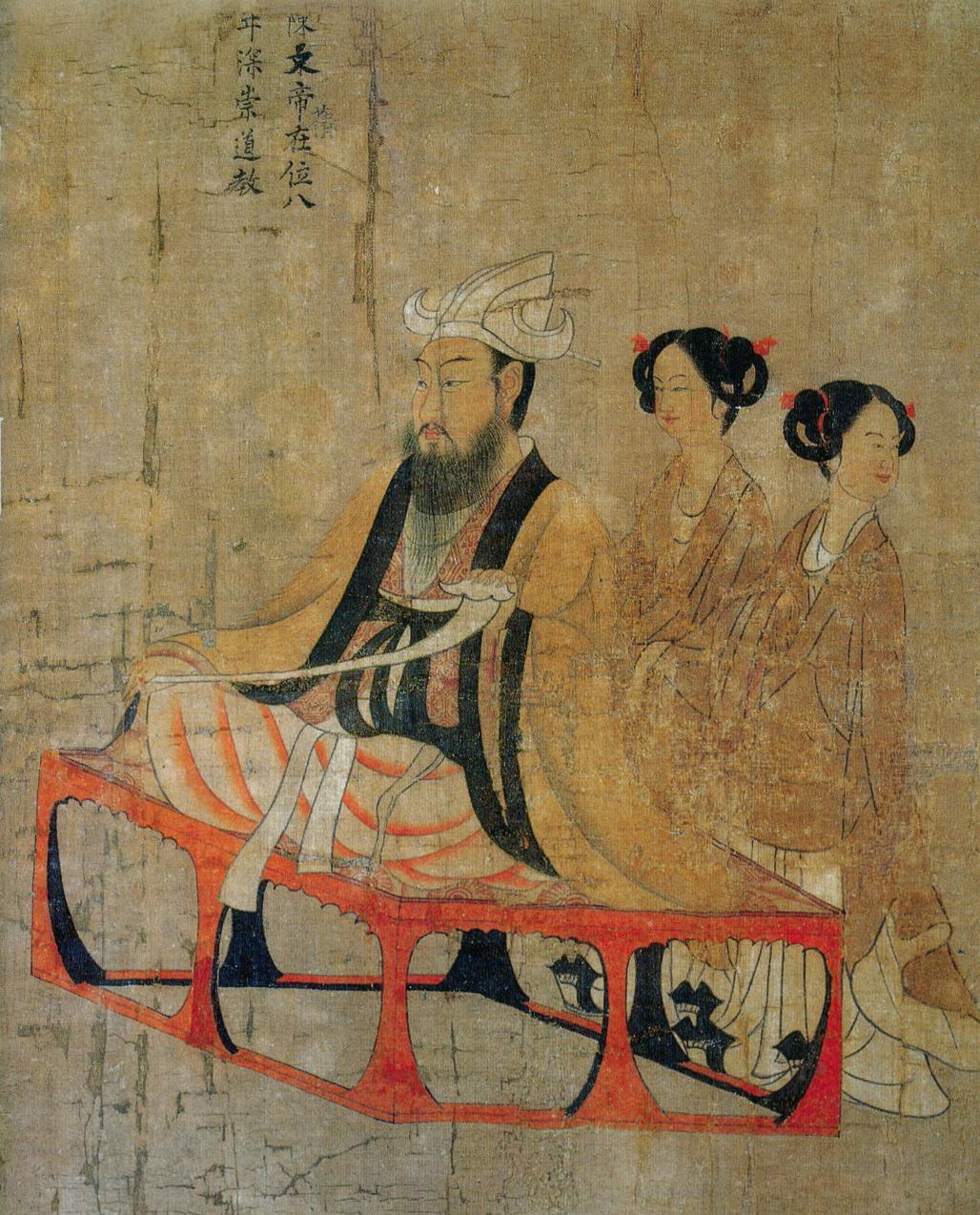
- Tang dynasty portrait of Emperor Wen by Yan Liben

Emperor of the Chen dynasty
- Reign: 17 August 559 – 31 May 566
- Predecessor: Emperor Wu
- Successor: Emperor Fei
- Born: 522
- Died: 566 (aged 43–44)
- Burial: Yongning Mausoleum (永寧陵, in present-day Qixia District, Nanjing)
- Consorts: Empress Ande; Han Zigao
- Issue: Chen Bozong; Chen Bomao; Chen Boshan; Chen Bogu; Chen Bogong; Chen Boxin; Chen Boren; Chen Boyi; Chen Boli; Chen Bozhi; Chen Bomou; Princess Feng'an; Princess Fuyang
Names
- Family name: Chen (陳); Given name: Qian (蒨); Courtesy name: Zihua (子華)
Era dates
- Tiān jiā (天嘉): 560-566; Tiān kāng (天康): 566
Posthumous name
- Emperor Wen (文皇帝)
Temple name
- Shizu (世祖)
- Dynasty: Chen dynasty
- Father: Chen Daotan

Emperor Wen of Chen (陳文帝) (522 – 31 May 566), personal name Chen Qian (陳蒨), also called Chen Tanqian (陳曇蒨), courtesy name Zihua (子華), was the second emperor of the Chinese Chen dynasty. He was a nephew of the founding monarch, Emperor Wu (Chen Baxian), and after Emperor Wu's death in 559, the officials supported him to be emperor since Emperor Wu's only surviving son, Chen Chang, was detained by the Northern Zhou dynasty. At the time he took the throne, Chen had been devastated by war during the preceding Liang dynasty, and many provinces nominally loyal to him were under control of relatively independent warlords. During his reign, he consolidated the state against warlords, and he also seized territory belonging to claimants to the Liang throne, Xiao Zhuang and the Emperor Xuan of Western Liang, greatly expanding Chen's territory and strength.

== During Liang Dynasty ==
Chen Qian was born in 522, as the oldest son of Chen Daotan (陳道譚), a commander of the Liang Dynasty palace guards. His mother's name is not recorded in history. When the rebel general Hou Jing attacked the capital Jiankang in 548 and put it under siege, Chen Daotan participated in the defense of Jiankang against Hou's siege, commanding archers, and he was killed by a stray arrow during the siege. (As the palace did not fall to Hou until 549, it is not clear whether Chen Daotan died in 548 or 549.) It appeared that during the disturbance, in order to avoid the banditry that was common in the countryside, Chen Qian went to the Chens' home commandery of Wuxing (吳興, roughly modern Huzhou, Zhejiang). After his uncle Chen Baxian joined the campaign of Xiao Yi the Prince of Xiangdong (later Emperor Yuan) against Hou, Hou arrested both Chen Qian and Chen Baxian's son Chen Chang and imprisoned them. Only after the victory of Emperor Yuan's forces (commanded by Wang Sengbian with Chen Baxian as Wang's lieutenant) over Hou were Chen Qian and Chen Chang freed, and Chen Qian joined Chen Baxian's army. He quickly distinguished himself in minor campaigns against local bandits, and he became one of Chen Baxian's trusted generals.

In 554, Western Wei forces attacked Emperor Yuan's new capital Jiangling (江陵, in modern Jingzhou, Hubei) and captured it, putting Emperor Yuan to death around new year 555. Western Wei declared Emperor Yuan's nephew Xiao Cha emperor (as Emperor Xuan), but Wang and Chen Baxian refused to recognize Xiao Cha as emperor. They welcomed Emperor Yuan's only surviving son Xiao Fangzhi the Prince of Jin'an to Jiankang, declaring him the Prince of Liang and preparing to declare him emperor. However, after Wang's forces suffered several defeats at the hands of Northern Qi forces, Wang accepted the proposal of Emperor Wenxuan of Northern Qi to make Emperor Yuan's cousin Xiao Yuanming emperor, and he declared Xiao Yuanming emperor in summer 555. Chen Baxian was displeased with Xiao Yuanming's ascension, and in fall 555, with Chen Qian as one of his confidants, he launched a surprise attack on Jiankang, killing Wang and deposing Xiao Yuanming. He declared Xiao Fangzhi emperor (as Emperor Jing).

Prior to taking action against Wang, Chen Baxian considered the probability that Wang's son-in-law Du Kan (杜龕), then the governor of Wuxing Commandery, would act against Chen Baxian, and secretly sent Chen Qian back to their home county of Changcheng (長城) to prepare to intercept Du if he tried to come to Wang's aid. When Chen Baxian succeeded surprisingly quickly, Du, along with Wei Zai (韋載) the governor of Yixing Commandery (義興, roughly modern Wuxi, Jiangsu), and Wang Sengzhi (王僧智, Wang Sengbian's brother) the governor of Wu Commandery (roughly modern Suzhou, Jiangsu) rose against Chen Baxian. Chen Qian was holding his position at Changcheng with several hundred men, and when Du's army attacked him with 5,000 men, he was able to hold against Du's attack, preventing Du from attacking Chen Baxian. This allowed Chen Baxian to come to his aid, forcing Wei to surrender and Wang Sengzhi to flee to Du. Chen Baxian subsequently returned to Jiankang (with Northern Qi forces, along with those of the generals Xu Sihui (徐嗣徽) and Ren Yue (任約), attacking Jiankang), leaving Chen Qian in command of the armies facing Du, joined by Chen Baxian's general Zhou Wenyu. In spring 556, Chen Qian secretly persuaded Du Kan's general Du Tai (杜泰) to surrender to him, and subsequently, Du Kan was captured and executed. Chen Qian and Zhou were subsequently also able to take over Eastern Yang Province (東揚州, modern northeastern Zhejiang) from its governor Zhang Biao (張彪), who was loyal to Wang Sengbian. With Chen Baxian still facing Northern Qi troops at Jiankang and lacking food supplies, Chen Qian was able to round up supplies of rice and ducks and deliver them to Jiankang to supply Chen Baxian's army, which subsequently defeated an even-worse-supplied Northern Qi force.

== During Emperor Wu's reign ==
In 557, Chen Baxian had Emperor Jing yield the throne to him, establishing Chen Dynasty as its Emperor Wu. He created Chen Qian, as his only close male relative in his territory, the Prince of Linchuan. His son Chen Chang, along with Chen Qian's brother Chen Xu, had been taken captive by Western Wei in 554, as they were serving as low level officials in Emperor Yuan's administration. Chen Qian's father Chen Daotan was posthumously honored as the Prince of Shixing, and Chen Xu, although not physically in Chen territory, was created the Prince of Shixing to inherit Chen Daotan's title.

In fall 558, after the Liang general Wang Lin (who had by that point declared Emperor Yuan's grandson Xiao Zhuang emperor) had defeated and captured Emperor Wu's key generals Zhou Wenyu and Hou Andu (although both Zhou and Hou were about to flee from their captivity soon thereafter), Emperor Wu, while negotiating a peace settlement with Wang, also sent Chen Qian with a large fleet to prepare to attack Wang should a peace agreement not happen. Subsequently, a peace was negotiated with Wang, although border conflicts continued, and Chen Qian, by Emperor Wu's orders, constructed a fortress at Nanhuan (南皖, in modern Anqing, Anhui) to defend a potential Wang attack.

While Chen Qian was still at Nanhuan, in summer 559, Emperor Wu grew ill and quickly died. Emperor Wu's wife Empress Zhang Yao'er, after consulting the officials Du Leng (杜稜) and Cai Jingli (蔡景歷), chose not to announce Emperor Wu's death and summoned Chen Qian back from Nanhuan. The imperial officials, led by Hou, decided to support Chen Qian as emperor, and while Empress Zhang was initially hesitant, hoping that Chen Chang would return, she eventually agreed, and Chen Qian took the throne as Emperor Wen.

== Reign ==
Emperor Wen honored Empress Zhang as empress dowager. He created his wife Princess Shen Miaorong empress and her son Chen Bozong crown prince. As he inherited the throne from Emperor Wu, he did not posthumously honor his father Chen Daotan as an emperor as might otherwise have been expected, but, in order to make sure that his father would be properly venerated (which would require Chen Daotan's legal heir—Emperor Wen's brother Chen Xu—to be present to offer sacrifices to him), he created his own son Chen Bomao (陳伯茂) the Prince of Shixing instead, and created Chen Xu, who was then still at Chang'an, the capital of Western Wei's successor state Northern Zhou, the Prince of Ancheng. (In 563, Emperor Wen himself began to offer sacrifices to Chen Daotan using ceremonies due an emperor, but never honored his father as an emperor.)

Hearing that Emperor Wu had died, Wang Lin launched a major attack on Chen in winter 559. He was initially successful, defeating the Chen general Wu Mingche, but when Emperor Wen sent Hou Tian against Wang, the forces stalemated, even though Wang was also assisted by Northern Qi forces. In spring 560, Hou defeated Wang, and both Wang and Xiao Zhuang fled to Northern Qi. Chen forces took about half of Xiao Zhuang's territory, while the other half went to the Northern Zhou-supported Western Liang.

Wang's defeat brought a succession crisis. After hearing of Emperor Wu's death, Northern Zhou had sent Chen Chang back to Chen, but as his path was blocked by Wang's forces, he had to stop at Anlu (安陸, in modern Xiaogan, Hubei). After Wang was defeated, Chen Chang continued his journey, and as he proceeded from Anlu to the Yangtze River, he wrote impolite letters to Emperor Wen, which Emperor Wen took as a demand for the throne. Emperor Wen summoned Hou Andu, suggesting that perhaps he should yield the throne to Chen Chang and accept a princely title. Hou advised him not to, and offered to personally "greet" Chen Chang. Meanwhile, the officials were all suggesting creating Chen Chang an imperial prince, and Emperor Wen declared that Chen Chang was to be created the Prince of Hengyang. A month later, Chen Chang entered Chen territory and met Hou. However, as they travelled on the Yangtze River, Hou had him killed and his body thrown into the Yangtze, and then returned to Jiankang, claiming that Chen Chang had slipped into the river. Grateful that Hou had eliminated a rival for him, Emperor Wen created Hou the Duke of Qingyuan.

In fall 560, Chen forces under Hou Tian began to engage Northern Zhou and Western Liang forces in the modern Hunan region, which Western Liang had taken from Xiao Zhuang when he fled to Northern Qi. The armies stalemated, and in spring 561, unable to prevail over the Northern Zhou general Heruo Dun (賀若敦), Hou Tian offered to allow Heruo to withdraw with his army if he would yield the territory. Heruo agreed, and the territory became Chen possession. Seeking peace, Northern Zhou offered to return Chen Xu to Chen, and Emperor Wen, pleased, offered to trade the city of Lushan (魯山, in modern Wuhan, Hubei) for Chen Xu's release. Chen Xu returned to Chen in 562 and became a key official in Emperor Wen's administration. Initially, Northern Zhou continued to detain Chen Xu's wife Liu Jingyan and son Chen Shubao, but after further negotiations, Northern Zhou released them as well.

Meanwhile, Emperor Wen began to consider the problem of local warlordism—which rendered the modern Jiangxi, Fujian, and large parts of Zhejiang under warlord control and only nominally submissive to him. In spring 562, he tried to summon one of the key warlords, Zhou Di (周迪), to move from his base of Linchuan (臨川, in modern Fuzhou, Jiangxi), to Pencheng (湓城, in modern Jiujiang, Jiangxi). Zhou Di refused, and subsequently unsuccessfully attacked Emperor Wen's general Zhou Fu (周敷). Emperor Wen sent Wu Mingche to attack Zhou Di and sent Hou Andu against another warlord, Liu Yi (留異), who controlled modern southern Zhejiang. By summer 562, Hou had defeated Liu Yi, forcing him to flee to his son-in-law, Chen Baoying (陳寶應), who controlled modern Fujian. Wu, however, was unable to immediately defeat Zhou Di, and Emperor Wen sent Chen Xu to attack Zhou Di instead. In spring 563, Zhou Di's forces collapsed, and he fled to Chen Baoying as well. Chen Baoying, Liu Yi, and Zhou Di regrouped together and resisted Emperor Wen's forces and prepared to counterattack. Zhou soon began a guerrilla campaign, while Chen Baoying and Liu held out at Chen Baoying's headquarters at Jin'an (晉安, in modern Fuzhou, Fujian).

Meanwhile, Emperor Wen had become increasingly angry and suspicious of Hou Andu's arrogance and protection of his officers' misdeeds. In summer 563, he arrested Hou and forced him to commit suicide. In summer 564, Zhou Di, after several successful battles, regained some of his following, and soon tricked and assassinated Zhou Fu. However, Emperor Wen's general Zhang Zhaoda was able to capture Jin'an. Chen Baoying and Liu fled but were captured and executed. By fall 565, Emperor Wen's general Cheng Lingxi (程靈洗) was able to defeat Zhou Di, who was subsequently betrayed by his own soldiers and killed. Emperor Wen had by now largely unified his state.

In summer 566, Emperor Wen grew ill. Fearing that Crown Prince Bozong was weak in personality and unable to serve competently as emperor, he offered to pass the throne to Chen Xu. Chen Xu himself declined, and the official Kong Huan (孔奐) also opposed. Emperor Wen therefore did not make Chen Xu crown prince instead, but entrusted the important matters to Chen Xu, Kong, Dao Zhongju (到仲舉), Yuan Shu (袁樞), and Liu Shizhi (劉師知). He soon died, and Crown Prince Bozong took the throne as Emperor Fei.

The historian Yao Silian had this to say about Emperor Wen in his Book of Chen (referring to Emperor Wen by his temple name Shizu):

Shizu [Emperor Wen] grew up in difficult times, and he knew much about the people's suffering. He was observant of things and frugal in his lifestyle. Ever night, he would order his servants to open the door to his sleeping quarters, to bring in the emergency submissions so that he could review them. He also ordered that his guards, whenever they were to change shifts, should throw their shift plates on the stone steps so that they would be loud enough to wake him.

== Relationship with Han Zigao ==
Around 554, when he was still a general, he met the 16-year-old Han Zigao, a poor country boy. After entering Chen's service, the last gave him a new name, Zigao, and made him his personal assistant. Not long after, Han Zigao became his favorite. By nature, Han Zigao was respectful and cautious, serving Chen Qian with all his heart and soul, carrying a sword to defend Chen Qian, and serving Chen Qian wine and food. When Chen Qian was anxious, Han Zigao could always comprehend the reason. After getting older, he learned riding and shooting skills, and being brave and decisive, soon became a commander. Chen Qian was very pleased with him and never let him go away. Chen Qian once dreamed that he was riding a horse in the mountains: the road was dangerous, and he was about to fall down the mountain, but was saved by Han Zigao. Han Zigao indeed saved his life later, during a night attack on their camp.

Chen Qian became an Emperor in 559 and made Han Zigao a general. Being very successful in his campaigns, Han Zigao was considered the best general of the state and received several promotions. In the sixth year of Tianjia (565), he was recalled back to the imperial court to serve as a general of the Right guard, and went to the capital Jiankang (now Nanjing, Jiangsu) to guard the emperor's palace. When Chen Qian became seriously ill, Han Zigao spent his time with him serving him medicine, until Chen Qian died in 566.

Less than a year after Chen Qian's death, in order to protect Chen Qian's son, young emperor Chen Fei, Han Zigao plotted with the official Dao Zhongju against Chen Qian's younger brother and future emperor Chen Xu, whose power in the imperial court began to worry some officials. The plot was however exposed, and Han Zigao was forced to commit suicide as punishment. He was thirty years old. His father Han Yanqing and his nephews were pardoned.

== Family ==
- Empress Ande, of the Shen clan of Wuxing (安德皇后 吳興沈氏; d. 605), personal name Miaorong (妙容)
  - Chen Bozong, Prince Linhai (臨海王 陳伯宗; 552–570), first son
  - Chen Bomao, Prince of Shixing (始興王 陳伯茂; 551–568), second son
- Guifei, of the Jiang clan (貴妃 江氏)
  - Chen Bozhi, Prince of Yongyang (永陽王 陳伯智), 12th son
- Guifei, of the Kong clan (貴妃 孔氏)
  - Chen Bomou, Prince of Guiyang (桂陽王 陳伯謀), 13th son
- Shuyuan, of the Yan clan (淑媛 嚴氏; d. 587)
  - Chen Boshan, Prince of Poyang (鄱陽王 陳伯山; 550–589), third son
  - Chen Bogong, Prince of Jin'an (晉安王 陳伯恭), sixth son
- Zhaohua, of the Liu clan (昭華 劉氏)
  - Chen Boxin, Prince of Hengyang (衡陽王 陳伯信; d. 589), seventh son
- Xiuhua, of the Han clan (修華 韓氏)
  - Chen Boli, Prince of Wuling (武陵王 陳伯禮), tenth son
- Xiurong, of the Zhang clan (修容 張氏)
  - Chen Boyi, Prince of Jiangxia (江夏王 陳伯義; d. 589), ninth son
- Ronghua, of the Pan clan (容華 潘氏)
  - Chen Bogu, Prince of Xin'an (新安王 陳伯固; 555–582), fifth son
- Chonghua, of the Wang clan (充華 王氏)
  - Chen Boren, Prince of Luling (廬陵王 陳伯仁), eighth son
- Unknown
  - Princess Feng'an (豐安公主), first daughter
    - Married Liu Zhenchen (留貞臣) in 557
  - Princess Fuyang (富陽公主), second daughter
    - Married Hou Jingcang (侯淨藏; d. 571)
    - Married Liu Pan of Hedong (河東 柳盼)

Regnal titles
Preceded by Emperor Wu of Chen	Emperor of Chen Dynasty; 559–566	Succeeded by Emperor Fei of Chen
Preceded by Emperor Wu of Chen	Emperor of China (Southeastern); 559–566	Succeeded by Emperor Fei of Chen
Preceded by Xiao Zhuang of Liang Dynasty	Emperor of China (Eastern Hubei/Northern Jiangxi); 560–566	Succeeded by Emperor Fei of Chen
Preceded by Emperor Xuan of Western Liang	Emperor of China (Hunan); 561–566	Succeeded by Emperor Fei of Chen
