= Zhou Wenyu =

Liang and Chen dynasty general (509–559)

- 周文育

General Who Guards the South (鎮南將軍)
- In office 557–559
- Monarch: Emperor Wu of Chen

Personal details
- Born: 509 Shouchang, Zhejiang
- Died: 19 July 559
- Children: Zhou Bao'an
- Parent: Zhou Hui (adoptive father)
- Courtesy name: Jingde (景德)
- Original name: Xiang Mengnu (項猛奴)
- Peerage: Duke of Shouchang County (壽昌縣公)
- Posthumous name: Zhongmin (忠愍)

Zhou Wenyu (509–19 July 559), courtesy name Jingde, né Xiang Mengnu, was a military general of the Liang and Chen dynasties during the Northern and Southern dynasties period. He was one of Chen Baxian's earliest followers who participated in his suppression of Hou Jing's rebellion. Following Chen's assassination of Wang Sengbian in 555, Zhou helped Chen in stamping out remnants of Wang's army and most notably defeated the Inspector of Guang province, Xiao Bo. After Chen Baxian established the Chen dynasty, he continued to serve as a general before he was assassinated by a peer in 559.

== Background ==
Zhou Wenyu, originally known as Xiang Mengnu, was born into a poor family in Shouchang County, Xin'an Commandery (新安, roughly modern Hangzhou, Zhejiang) and orphaned at a young age after the death of his father. At the age of 11, he was already described as physically strong, being able to swim several miles and jump a great height. A local garrison commander, Zhou Hui (周薈) of Yixing Commandery, eventually discovered him and adopted him as his son.

Accompanying his adoptive father back to the capital, Jiankang, he was then introduced to the minister, Zhou She (周舍), who gave him the personal name of "Wenyu" and the courtesy name of "Jingde". Zhou She also instructed his nephew, Zhou Hongrang (周弘讓) to teach Zhou Wenyu how to read and write. However, Wenyu showed little interest in his studies, stating "Those who can learn can only achieve wealth and honour with a large spear." Impressed by his words, Hongrang taught him horse riding and archery instead.

== Early career under the Liang dynasty ==
=== Baishui tribes rebellion ===
Zhou Hui later served in the staff of the Inspector of Si province, Chen Qingzhi. He was commissioned to comfort the Baishui tribes (白水蠻) in Xuanhu (懸瓠; in present-day Runan County, Henan), and brought along Zhou Wenyu and 500 soldiers with him. However, the tribes were planning to rebel and apprehend Zhou Hui to surrender to the Northern Wei, but the plot was leaked. Heavy fighting ensued between the two sides, and Zhou Hui was killed in battle. Zhou Wenyu fought hard to retrieve his father's body and was wounded nine times, but the tribes were soon intimidated by his ferocity as he charged into their ranks, so they did not dare approach him. The battle turned into a stalemate that lasted until dark, after which the tribes dispersed. Zhou recovered from his injuries and handed in his resignation to Chen Qingzhi so that he can carry out his father's burial in his hometown. Chen permitted him and sent him off with generous gifts.

=== Mutiny in Jiao province ===
After burying his father, Zhou Wenyu entered the service of the Inspector of Southern Jiang province, Lu Anxing (盧安興) to Guang province. Distinguishing himself against the Liliao people, Zhou was appointed the Magistrate of Nanhai County. Following Lu Anxing's death, his son, Lu Zixiong (盧子雄) participated in the campaign against the rebel Lý Bôn in Jiao province. The campaign ended in failure, as the Liang soldiers were not adapt to the hot and humid climate of the province, but the Inspector of Jiao, Xiao Zi (蕭諮), accused Lu of colluding with the rebels and executed him under false charges.

Angered by his unjust death, Zhou Wenyu, Du Tianhe (杜天合) and Du Sengming launched a mutiny with Lu's brother, Lu Zilue (盧子略) as their leader. They marched on to Guang province, planning to kill Xiao Zi and the Inspector of Guang province, Xiao Ying (蕭映) as they forces swelled to the tens of thousands within a day. They then besieged the provincial capital of Guang, surrounding the city from all sides. The Administrator of Gaoyao, Chen Baxian brought 3,000 elite troops to fight against the rebels and defeated them at the foot of the city. Du Tianhe was killed by a stray arrow, while Zhou Wenyu and Du Sengming were captured.

Chen released the two men, recruiting Du into his staff while Zhou went to join the new Inspector of Guang province, Wang Mai (王勱), who entrusted Zhou as an important high-ranking official. When Wang was recalled to the north, Zhou initially followed him as well. According to the Book of Chen, when Zhou reached the Dayu Mountains, he consulted a diviner, who told him, "If you go north, you will only become magistrate; if you remain in the south, you will become a duke or marquis". Zhou replied, "The money is enough. Why should I aspire for dukedom?" The diviner said, "You will soon suddenly acquire two thousand taels of silver. If you do not believe my reading, then take this as proof." That evening, Zhou stayed at an inn, where he was asked by a merchant to gamble. Zhou won, and he received a winning of two thousand taels of silver. The following day, Zhou bid farewell to Wang Mai, and after explaining his reasoning, Wang allowed him to leave.

When Chen Baxian heard of his return in Gaoyao (高要, roughly modern Zhaoqing, Guangdong), he was elated and sent his men to welcome him. He showered Zhou with gifts and assigned him to one of his subordinates. Zhou and Du Sengming later followed Chen in his campaign against Lý Bôn, driving him and his forces into hiding.

== Service under Chen Baxian ==
=== The Hou Jing Disturbance ===
As the rebellion in Jiao appeared to die down, Hou Jing, an Eastern Wei general who defected to Liang, rebelled and captured Jiankang in 549. Chen Baxian marched north to suppress the rebellion, and along the way, he defeated the Inspector of Guang, Yuan Jingzhong (元景仲) and the former Inspector of Gao province, Lan Yu (蘭裕). Both Zhou Wenyu and Du Sengming served as the vanguard and made many military achievements against Yuan and Lan.

In 550, as he continued his way to the capital, Chen's path was blocked by the Nankang warlord, Cai Luyang (蔡路養), and they fought a bloody battle at Nanye (南野; south of present-day Nankang, Jiangxi). During the battle, Zhou Wenyu was surrounded and shot at with arrows and stones. Despite his horse dying, he was able to break through the encirclement and join forces with Du Sengming, eventually defeating Cai Luyang. Chen then occupied Nankang and appointed Zhou as a Marshal.

At the time, the Inspector of Gao province, Li Qianshi (李遷仕) occupied Dagao (大皋; south of present-day Ji'an, Jiangxi) and sent his general, Du Pinglu (杜平虜) with an army to Ganshi (灨石, located between Ganxian and Wan'an County in Jiangxi) to build a fort at Yuliang (魚梁城; south of Wan'an County, Jiangxi). Zhou Wenyu attacked Yuliang and forced Du to flee his fort. Li then brought his main force to face Zhou, but while they initially fought to a stalemate, Du Sengming arrived with reinforcements and defeated Li. The Prince of Xiangdong, Xiao Yi appointed Zhou as Faithful Hero General and Inspector of Yi province. Li Qianshi fled to Ningdu, and with the support of the local warlord, Liu Xiaoshang (劉孝尚), he attacked Chen Baxian. Chen ordered Zhou, Du and others to defend Baikou, where they fought with Li for more than a hundred days before capturing and killing him. In 551, Chen Baxian set out from Nankang and marched north along the Gan river, sending Zhou Wenyu ahead to open up the river routes. He captured Yuzhang (豫章郡; around present-day Nanchang, Jiangxi) and defeated the general, Wang Bochou (王伯醜), for which he was promoted to General of the Mobile Cavalry and Regular Mounted Attendant and bestowed the title of Marquis of Dongqian.

In 552, Chen Baxian finally arrived at Baimaowan (白茅灣; northeast of present-day Jiujiang, Jiangxi) to join forces with the Liang commander, Wang Sengbian and face Hou Jing in battle. He placed Zhou Wenyu and Du Sengming in charge of the vanguard, and together they successively captured Nanling, Quetou (鵲頭; in present-day Tongling, Anhui), Gusu (姑孰; in present-day Dangtu County, Anhui) and others before reaching Jiankang. Hou Jing was unable to stop their advance and fled, during which he was killed by his own subordinate. With the rebellion quelled, Xiao Yi proclaimed himself as emperor at Jiangling, posthumously known as Emperor Yuan. For his meritorious deeds, Zhou Wenyu was appointed Communications Regular Mounted Attendant and Administrator of Xinyi, as well as granted the title of Marquis of Nanyi County. Later, he was promoted to Regular Mounted Attendant and General of Martial Wisdom. He also served as Administrator for the three commanderies of Southern Danyang, Lanling and Jinling.

=== Campaign against Wang Sengbian's remnants ===
In 554, after Emperor Yuan was captured and killed by Western Wei forces at Jiangling, Wang Sengbian and Chen Baxian intended to install his son, Xiao Fangzhi to the throne at Jiankang. However, relations between Wang and Chen broke then when the former caved in to pressure by the Northern Qi to install a pro-Qi ruler, Xiao Yuanming to the throne instead in 555. Furious, Chen brought his generals, including Zhou Wenyu, to discuss a surprise attack on Wang at Jiankang from their base in Jingkou. In September or October, they killed Wang and his sons before forcing Xiao Yuanming to pass the throne to Xiao Fangzhi, posthumously known as Emperor Jing.

In response to Wang's death, his son-in-law, Du Kan rebelled in Wuxing Commandery (吳興, roughly modern Huzhou, Zhejiang). The Administrator of Yixing, Wei Zai (韋載) also raised his troops in support. Chen dispatched Zhou Wenyu to attack Wei Zai, but his city was well-fortified and Zhou was locked in a stalemate. Chen personally led his army to help Zhou, breaking the water barrier outside the city and persuading Wei Zai to surrender with the emperor's edict. Zhou then linked up with Chen's nephew, Chen Qian at Changcheng (長城; in present-day Changxing County, Zhejiang) to attack Du Kan at Wuxing. In 556, Du was defeated, and after his surrender, he was killed.

The Inspector of Eastern Yang province, Zhang Biao (張彪) was a close friend of Wang Sengbian and attacked Linhai Commandery to oppose Chen Baxian. Zhou Wenyu and Chen Qian carried out a surprise attack on Kuaiji, forcing the defending general, Shen Tai (沈泰), to surrender. Chen Qian then occupied Kuaiji and stationed Zhou at Xiangyan Temple (香巖寺) north of the city. However, Zhang attacked Kuaiji overnight and recaptured the commandery city. Chen Qian fled to Zhou's camp and set up his defence against Zhang. Zhou fought hard in the battle, enticing the general Shen Jin (申縉) to surrender before finally defeating Zhang. The enemy forces in the eastern Zhenjiang region was thus wiped out.

Subsequently, Chen Baxian appointed Zhou Wenyu the Chief Controller of military affairs of Southern Yu province, General of Military Might and Inspector of Southern Yu province. Zhou was then commissioned to attack Pengcheng and suppress the Inspector of Jiang province, Hou Tian. As he campaigned against Hou Tian, however, Xu Sihui once again allied with Northern Qi to march south and captured Wuhu. Chen hurriedly recalled Zhou from Pengcheng to defend Jiankang. Xu deployed warships from Qingdun (青墩; southwest of present-day Dangtu County, Anhui) to Qiji (七矶; northwest of present-day Wuhu, Anhui) to cut off Zhou's retreat. That evening, Zhou launched an attack with drums beating, and Xu was unable to stop him. At daybreak, Zhou carried out a counterattack. Xu's general, Bao Peng (鮑砰) was leading the rearguard in a ship. Zhou, commandeering a small boat, leap aboard Bao Peng's ship, killed him and seized the ship before returning. The rebels were terrified by Zhou's feat and abandoned their warships at Wuhu to flee to Jiankang.

Chen Baxian placed Jiankang under martial law and went to Baicheng to fight Xu Sihui, where he was rejoined by Zhou Wenyu. As the two armies were about to face each other in battle, a strong wind suddenly arose. Chen said, "An army must not fight against the wind," but Zhou retorted, "The situation is dire now, and we must make a decision. Why care for the ancient method?" Zhou took up his spear, mounted his horse and led his troops forward. Soon, the wind changed direction, and Zhou took advantage of the situation and defeated Xu Sihui, killing and wounding hundreds of the enemy troops. Xu was left with no choice and had to retreat to Mount Mofu, but he was eventually captured and killed by Chen Baxian along with forty other Northern Qi generals.

=== Campaign against Xiao Bo ===
In 557, the Inspector of Guang province, Xiao Bo raised an army to oppose Chen Baxian and crossed the Nanling Mountains to Nankang. His vanguard, led by his son Xiao Zi (蕭孜) and others, occupied Yuzhang and stationed their troops at various strategic locations. Ouyang Wei occupied Kuzhu Shoal (苦竹灘; northwest of present-day Fengcheng, Jiangxi), Fu Tai (傅泰) held Chengkoucheng (墌口城; south of present-day Nanchang, Jiangxi) and Yu Xiaoqing camped at Shitou. Zhou Wenyu led his army south to confront Xiao Zi and others at Yuzhang. At the time, his army was short of ships, while Xiao's general, Yu Xiaoqing had 300 boats and more than a hundred warships anchored at Shanglao (上牢; northeast of present-day Fengxin County, Jiangxi). Zhou sent his officer, Jiao Sengdu (焦僧度) to carry out a surprise attack on Shanglao and captured all of their ships.

However, Zhou's army soon ran out of food and money, and everyone in his army wanted to retreat. The Interior Minister of Linchuan, Zhou Di was observing the battlefield from the border and waiting for the outcome. Zhou Wenyu wrote a letter to him and persuaded him into providing his army with food and money, becoming sworn brothers in the process. Zhou Wenyu then used an old boat to send away the weak and old, burnt his camp fence and feigned retreat. Yu Xiaoqing fell for his bluff and stopped defending his garrison. Zhou took a small road to attacked Qianshao, occupying the city. Xiao Zi and Ouyang Xi were in the upper reaches of Qianshao while Fu Tai and Yu Xiaoqing were in the lower reaches. Zhou therefore built a city in the middle, cutting them off from each other. Xiao Zi's forces were terrified, and Ouyang Wei retreated to Nixi (泥溪; southwest of present-day Xingan County, Jiangxi) to build a city of his own, but was captured by the general, Zhou Tiehu.

Zhou Wenyu then advanced to Chengkou and captured Fu Tai. When news of the defeats reached Nankang, Xiao Bo's army was thrown into disorder. Xiao Bo was killed by his own generals, and all his followers surrendered to Zhou. Xiao Zi and Yu Xiaoqing withdrew to Shitou, each occupying a city and deploying their warships along the banks of the Gan river. Chen Baxian ordered his general, Hou Andu to reinforce Zhou, and Hou burnt the enemy ships at night and attacked with Zhou on land and water. They set up camps and gradually advanced, repeatedly winning their battles. Xiao Zi was forced to surrender while Yu Xiaoqing fled to Xinwu (新吳; west of present-day Fengxin County, Jiangxi).

After defeating Xiao Bo, Zhou Wenyu was stationed at Yuzhang and promoted to General Who Guards the South, Minister of the Palace with Equal Rank to the Three Excellencies, Chief Controller of military affairs of the provinces of Jiang, Guang, Heng and Jiao, and Inspector of Jiang province.

=== Capture by Wang Lin ===
In June or July, Hou and Zhou were ordered to march to Wuchang and attack Wang Lin. However, they were dealt a shocking defeat at Dunkou (沌口; southeast of present-day Hanyang, Hubei) as both generals were captured in battle. Wang Lin had them chained and ordered his eunuch, Wang Zijin (王子晉) to watch them. Later, when Wang Lin camped at Baishuipu (白水浦; west of the Jiujiang, Jiangxi), Hou managed to bribe the eunuch into granting their freedom. Wang Zijin requested to go on a fishing trip with Zhou, Hou and Xu Jingcheng, and once ashore, he allowed the three prisoners to escape. Zhou Wenyu and two of his friends hid among the grass and walked back to their camp. They then visited the court in Jiankang to apologize to Chen Baxian for their capture. By then, Chen had already proclaimed himself as emperor, establishing the Chen dynasty. He pardoned Zhou and reinstated him to his previous titles.

== Death ==
Though Yu Xiaoqing had been pacified, his son, Yu Gongyang (餘公颺) and his brother, Yu Xiaomai (餘孝勱) were still rebelling in the south. In 558, Chen Baxian sent Zhou Wenyu, Zhou Di and Huang Fayan to suppress him. The Interior Minister of Yuzhang, Xiong Tanlang also sent his troops to help. In 559, Zhou Wenyu assigned Wu Mingche to lead the navy in transporting food to Zhou Di while he led his army into the Xiangya river (象牙江) to camp at Jinkou (金口; southwest of Xinjian, Jiangxi). Yu Gongyang pretended to surrender, hoping to capture Zhou Wenyu from within, but was discovered. Zhou took Yu prisoner and sent him to Jiankang before taking Sanbi (三陂; southwest of Xinjian, Jiangxi) by land. At this time, Wang Lin dispatched his general, Cao Qing (曹慶) to rescue Yu Xiaomai. Cao sent his subordinate, Chang Zhong'ai (常衆愛) to oppose Zhou Wenyu, while he led his troops to defeat Zhou Di and Wu Mingche. When Zhou Wenyu heard of Zhou Di's defeat, he retreated to Jinkou.

With the defeat of the Chen army, Xiong Tanlang planned on killing Zhou and surrendering Chang Zhong'ai. Though his advisor, Sun Baixiang (孫白象), saw through the plot and urged him to kill Xiong, Zhou was reluctant as he did not want to cause panic among their troops, especially since they were outnumbered. He instead proposed that they gently appease Xiong by showing him goodwill. Eventually, Zhou Di, who had not been heard from since his defeat, sent a letter. Excited, Zhou Wenyu visited Xiong in his camp to show him the letter, but Xiong took this opportunity to assassinate him. When Chen Baxian heard of Zhou Wenyu's death, he mourned him and posthumously appointed him Palace Attendant and Minister of Works. He also bestowed him the posthumous name of "Zhongmin".

== Anecdotes ==
=== Fate of three generals ===
While Chen was still a Liang general defending Jingkou, he once held a feast with his officers. Du Sengming, Hou Andu and Zhou Wenyu were all bragging about their contributions. Chen responded:

You are all great soldiers of this time, but you all have weaknesses as well. Lord Du has great foresight but insufficient wisdom; you engage in foolish games with your subordinates and are proud to your superiors. Lord Zhou is true to friends, but you are not selective in whom you associate with, and you are overly trusting of others. Lord Hou is overly arrogant and does not know when to stop, and you are frivolous and temperamental. These are not ways to protect your lives.

Chen's prediction about Zhou turned out to be true, as his trust in Xiong Tanlang became his downfall.

=== Premonition of death ===
According to his biography in the Book of Chen, when Zhou Wenyu occupied Sanbi before his death, a meteor fell with a thunderous roar, leaving behind a large crater and several bushels of broken charcoal. Soon, the Chen army heard the crying of a child that seemed to be coming from underground. The soldiers dug up the area and found a three-foot-long coffin, which unsettled Zhou. Not long after, Zhou Wenyu was killed.

== Sources ==
- Book of Chen
- History of the Southern Dynasties
- Zizhi Tongjian.
