= Du Sengming =

Liang dynasty general (509–554)

- 杜僧明

General Who Clears the Fields (清野將軍)
- In office 551 – ?
- Monarch: Emperor Jianwen of Liang/Xiao Dong/Emperor Yuan of Liang

Inspector of Xinzhou (新州刺史)
- In office 551 – ?
- Monarch: Emperor Jianwen of Liang/Xiao Dong/Emperor Yuan of Liang

Cavalier in Regular Attendance (散騎常侍)
- In office 552 – ?
- Monarch: Emperor Yuan of Liang

General Who Illuminates Might (明威將軍)
- In office 552 – ?
- Monarch: Emperor Yuan of Liang

General Who Pacifies the North (平北將軍)
- In office 554 – ?
- Monarch: Emperor Yuan of Liang

Personal details
- Born: 509 Gaoyou, Jiangsu
- Died: late 554
- Relations: Du Tianhe (brother)
- Children: Du Jin
- Courtesy name: Hongzhao (弘照)
- Peerage: Marquis of Linjiang (臨江縣侯)
- Posthumous name: Marquis of Wei (威侯)

Du Sengming (509– late 554), courtesy name Hongzhao, was a military general of the Liang dynasty during the Northern and Southern dynasties period. Sengming and Zhou Wenyu rebelled against the Liang dynasty in 543 when their master, Lu Zixiong (盧子雄) was executed, but after he was captured by Chen Baxian, he became one of Chen's generals. He greatly contributed in quelling the Hou Jing Disturbance and briefly fought with Northern Qi in 554 before dying at the young age of 46 (by East Asian reckoning). He, along with Zhou and Hou Andu, were considered the three key generals of Chen Baxian's rise to power.

== Early life and career ==
=== Service under Lu Anxing ===
Du Sengming was from Linze County (臨澤縣, in modern-day Gaoyou, Jiangsu) in Guangling Commandery. He was described as having a short stature but brave personality, excelling in both horse riding and archery. During the middle of the Datong era (大同, 535–546), he and his brother, Du Tianhe (杜天合), were subordinates of the Protector of Nanjiang province (南江州), Lu Anxing (盧安興). They helped him put down the revolts of the Liliao people and were stationed as Xin province (新洲, in modern-day Xinxing County, Guangdong) to defend the area. After Lu Anxing died, the brothers continued to serve his son, Lu Zixiong who took his father's position.

=== Mutiny in Jiao province ===
In 541, a rebellion headed by Lý Bôn (Li Bi) in Jiao province broke out in response to the cruel administration of the provincial inspector, Xiao Zi (蕭諮). The Inspector of Guang province, Xiao Ying (蕭映), was tasked in quelling the rebellion, accompanied by Lu Zixiong and Sun Jiong (孫冏) serving as his generals. At the time, the summer was unusually hot, so Lu and Sun advised Xiao Ying to wait for autumn. However, Xiao Ying ignored them, and in 542, he was badly defeated by the rebels. Xiao Zi was quick to accuse Lu and Sun of collaborating with the rebels. Emperor Wu of Liang believed Xiao Zi and issued the two's execution in December of that year.

The death of Lu Zixiong greatly angered Du Tianhe, as the Lu family had treated him well. He conspired with Lu Zixiong's brothers, Lu Zilüe (盧子略) and Lu Zilie (盧子烈) in Nanjiang, telling them:

"Lord Lu had long treated me kindly, and yet he still ended up wrongfully killed. If we do not take revenge now, how can we consider ourselves as men? My brother, Sengming, is one who can stand up to ten thousands. If we attack the city and rally the masses, none would dare not follow. Once we break into the city, we must sacrifice the two princes for Sun and Lu, then we shall wait for the envoys to come and bring us before the Minister of Justice with our hands bounded. To die here is better than to continue living. Even if we fail, our names will not be scorned."

The brothers agreed, and together with Du Sengming and their peer, Zhou Wenyu, they rose in rebellion and arrested the new Protector of Nanjiang, Shen Yi (沈顗). They marched onto Guang and placed the provincial capital under siege while their numbers rapidly grew, creating an entirely new crisis in the region. In 544, the Prefect of Gaoyao, Chen Baxian, was ordered by Xiao Ying to put down the rebels. With 3,000 elite soldiers, Chen crushed the rebellion. Du Tianhe was killed in battle while Du Sengming and Zhou Wenyu were both captured by Chen. Chen was impressed by Du and Zhou's display of bravery and thought of them as model soldiers. Hence, he decided not to punish them and released them. Du became a member of his staff, while Zhou followed suit soon after.

== Service under Chen Baxian ==
=== Hou Jing Disturbance (548–552) ===
In 548, the general Hou Jing, who had defected from Eastern Wei to Liang, rebelled and by 549 had captured the capital of Jiankang. Emperor Wu was placed under house arrest and died in captivity. The Inspector of Guang and member of the Northern Wei Yuan imperial family, Yuan Jingzhong (元景仲), was asked by Hou Jing to join him. When Chen heard this, he denounced Yuan Jingzhong and led his troops to attack him. During the campaign, Du and Zhou were both said to be meritorious, and after their victory, Chen compelled Yuan to commit suicide.

Later, the former Inspector of Gao province, Lan Yu (蘭裕), revolted in Shixing, so Chen went to quell his revolt. Du served as the vanguard general and with him, the revolt was crushed and Lan Yu was captured. With Shixing pacified, Du together with Hu Ying (胡穎) were ordered to garrison themselves at Dayu and gather the talents of Shixing before embarking north. However, Chen's plans to go to Jiankang was opposed by Emperor Wu's nephew, Xiao Bo, who he had initially invited Chen to occupy Guang province. Chen ignored him, so Xiao colluded with the Nankang warlord Cai Luyang (蔡路養) to make sure that Chen never makes it to the capital. Du Sengming fought in the battle with Cai when his horse was injured amidst the fighting, leaving him vulnerable. Chen quickly rode to battle and gave him his horse. With Chen's horse, Du resumed the battle and shifted the tide. Cai was defeated and Chen occupied Nankang.

The Inspector of Gao province and Hou Jing's ally, Li Qianshi (李遷仕), occupied Dagaokou (大皋口; south of present-day Ji'an, Jiangxi) and sent his general Du Pinglu (杜平虜) to Ganshi (灨石, located between Ganxian and Wan'an County in Jiangxi) to reinforce the area. Zhou defeated Du Pinglu and captured Ganshi, causing Li to personally led his troops to retake the city. Zhou and Li were caught in a stalemate, but reinforcements from Du Sengming allowed Zhou to repel Li in the end. Later, Li allied himself with a native of Ningdu, Liu Xiaoshang (劉孝尚), and together they laid siege on Chen's army at Nankang. Du and Zhou fought the enemy for 100 days, and in 551 they finally captured Li and executed him in Nankang.

Chen continued his advance along the Ganjiang river from Nankang. Du stayed in Xichang (西昌, in present-day Suzhou, Jiangsu), where he served as Chief Controller of Ancheng (安成, in modern Ji'an, Jiangxi) and Luling (盧陵; in modern Ji'an County, Jiangxi). Emperor Wu's son and de facto leader, Xiao Yi, awarded Du with the offices of General Who Clears the Fields and Inspector of Xinzhou (信州, modern eastern Chongqing) as well as the title of Viscount of Linjiang. Du was also granted 300 taxable households.

In 552, Chen set out from Yuzhang (豫章郡; around present-day Nanchang, Jiangxi) to help reclaim Jiankang from Hou Jing. He had Du serve as his vanguard once more, and he consecutively defeated Hou's army. When his army reached Caizhou, Du set fire to the rebel ships. Hou was defeated and killed that year, and Xiao Yi ascended the throne, later to be known as Emperor Yuan. For his merits in the war, Du was awarded Cavalier In Regular Attendance, General Who Illuminates Might, Inspector of Southern Yanzhou and acting Prefect of Jinling. He was also promoted to Marquis of Linjiang County, and his taxable households were increased to 500.

=== Relieving Dongfang Guang (554) ===
In 554, Du participated in the expedition to reclaim Guangling from Northern Qi. After Guangling was captured, he was awarded Commissioner Bearing Credentials and was promoted to Cavalier in Regular Attendance with Direct Access and General Who Pacifies the North. Around the time, a man named Dongfang Guang (東方光) rebelled against Qi in Suyu. The Qi general, Wang Qiu (王球) went to suppress him but Du came in support of Dongfang and repelled Wang.

== Death and posthumous honours ==
At the end of that year, Western Wei forces besieged Jiangling, where Emperor Yuan was situated. Du was supposed to lead his troops to rescue the city but on the way, he died in Jiangzhou at the age of 46 (by East Asian reckoning). He was posthumously appointed Cavalier In Regular Attendance and named Marquis of Wei. He was succeeded by his son, Du Jin (杜晉). Three years later in 557, Chen dissolved the Liang and established his Chen dynasty, becoming known in history as Emperor Wu of Chen. His nephew, Emperor Wen, succeeded him in 559 after he died, and further awarded Du the privilege of a Separate Office with equal ceremonial to the Three Excellencies.

== Anecdote ==
Traditional historians tell an account that supposedly foretold the fates of Du Sengming and his comrades, Zhou Wenyu and Hou Andu. When Chen held a feast for the three generals, they began to brag about their achievements against each other when Chen told them:

You are all great soldiers of this time, but you all have weaknesses as well. Lord Du has great foresight but insufficient wisdom; you engage in foolish games with your subordinates and are proud to your superiors. Lord Zhou is true to friends, but you are not selective in whom you associate with, and you are overly trusting of others. Lord Hou is overly arrogant and does not know when to stop, and you are frivolous and temperamental. These are not ways to protect your lives.

Later, Zhou was assassinated by a trusted associate, Xiong Tanlang, and Hou was executed by Emperor Wen for his arrogance. Du was the only one of the three to escape a violent fate and died peacefully, perhaps indicating that he changed his ways.
