= Wang Lin (general) =

Chinese Liang and Northern Qi general (526-573)

Wang Lin (王琳; 526 – 22 November 573), courtesy name Ziheng (子珩), formally Prince Zhongwu of Baling (巴陵忠武王), was a general of the Chinese Liang Dynasty and Northern Qi dynasties. He initially became prominent during Emperor Yuan of Liang's campaign against the rebel general Hou Jing, and later, after Emperor Yuan was defeated and killed by Western Wei forces in 554, he maintained a separate center of power from the dominant general of the remaining Liang provinces, Chen Baxian. After Chen Baxian seized the Liang throne in 557 and established the Chen Dynasty (as Emperor Wu), Wang, with Northern Qi support, declared the Liang prince Xiao Zhuang emperor in 558, making Xiao Zhuang one of the three contestants for the Southern Dynasty throne, against Chen Baxian and Emperor Xuan of Western Liang, supported by Western Wei. In 560, while trying to attack Chen Baxian's nephew and successor Emperor Wen of Chen, Wang was defeated, and both he and Xiao Zhuang fled to Northern Qi. Wang subsequently served as a Northern Qi general, and during a major Chen offensive against Northern Qi in 573, he was captured by the Chen general Wu Mingche and executed.

== Before Emperor Yuan's reign ==
Wang Lin was born in 526, and while his father's name was not recorded in history, his father was said to be a military officer, and Wang Lin grew up studying the military doctrines. His family was from Kuaiji Commandery along the southern shore of Hangzhou Bay. During the reign of Emperor Wu, Wang Lin had two sisters (one older, one younger) who became concubines to Emperor Wu's son, Xiao Yi the Prince of Xiangdong. As Xiao Yi later became an important provincial governor, Wang, even in his youth, served on Xiao Yi's staff and became a key military officer under Xiao Yi. At least one of his brothers, Wang Xun (王珣), was also a military officer under Xiao Yi.

The first historical reference to Wang Lin's military activities was in 549, when Xiao Yi, then governor of the important Jing Province (荊州, modern western Hubei), trying to send food supplies to the provincial armies trying to lift the siege on the capital Jiankang by the rebel general Hou Jing, ordered Wang to escort a large supply of rice to Jiankang's vicinity. Before Wang could arrive at Jiankang, however, he heard news that Jiankang had fallen and the provincial armies had disbanded. Fearful that the supply would be seized by Hou, Wang dumped the rice into the Yangtze River and returned to Jing Province. Xiao Yi soon made him a commandery governor and created him the Marquess of Jianning. In fall 550, Xiao Yi promoted the status of Yichang Commandery to Yi Province, and made Wang its governor.

In 551, Hou launched a major assault on Xiao Yi's territory, commanded by himself and his generals Ren Yue (任約) and Song Zixian (宋子仙), and after Hou made a surprise attack on Jiangxia (江夏, in modern Wuhan, Hubei) and captured it, he headed toward Xiao Yi's headquarters at Jiangling. Wang Lin's brother Wang Xun were among the officers who surrendered. Xiao Yi sent his main forces, commanded by Wang Sengbian, to take up position against Hou's forces at Baling (巴陵, in modern Yueyang, Hunan). Wang Lin served under Wang Sengbian in defending Baling against Hou, and when Hou brought Wang Xun to the frontline, trying to have him persuade Wang Lin to surrender, Wang Lin rebuked him and fired an arrow at him. Wang Xun, embarrassed, withdrew. Soon, Xiao Yi's forces, commanded by Wang Sengbian, fought back and defeated Hou's forces when Hou's food supplies ran out. Hou retreated, while leaving Song in command at Jiangxia. Wang Sengbian put it under siege, and Wang Lin participated in the battle, capturing Song. By this point, Wang Lin became well known for his strong rapport with his troops and how he shared the awards he received with his troops. He had about 10,000 men under him, and most of his soldiers were originally bandits from the region between the Yangtze and the Huai River, but who personally became loyal to him.

In 552, Wang Sengbian advanced on Jiankang and recaptured it, forcing Hou to flee. (Hou was subsequently killed by his own subordinates.) Wang Lin made a major contribution in the recapturing of Jiankang, but drew Wang Sengbian's ire by at times being insubordinate to Wang Sengbian. When Taiji Palace (太極殿) was burned in the confusion following Jiankang's fall, Wang Sengbian worried that Xiao Yi would punish him, and therefore sent reports to Xiao Yi implicating Wang Lin in the fire destroying Taiji Palace, requesting that Wang Lin be executed. Xiao Yi thereafter made Wang Lin the governor of Xiang Province (湘州, modern central Hunan) and ordered him to first report to Jiangling to see him. Wang Lin, realizing that something unusual was happening, sent his army directly to Xiang Province, commanded by his officer Lu Na (陸納), while personally reporting to Jiangling. Once he arrived at Jiangling, Xiao Yi arrested him and executed his deputy, Yin Yan (殷晏). In response, Lu and his forces rebelled against Xiao Yi's son Xiao Fanglüe (蕭方略), whom Xiao Yi had sent to replace Wang Lin, and Lu seized Changsha, the capital of Xiang Province.

== During Emperor Yuan's reign ==
During the campaign, Xiao Yi, who had long designs on the throne, finally declared himself emperor (as Emperor Yuan). However, he was then facing a dire situation—the empire had been ravaged by the wars, and his brother Xiao Ji the Prince of Wuling, who controlled the modern Sichuan and Chongqing, had several months earlier declared himself emperor, contesting Emperor Yuan's presumptive claim.

Meanwhile, Lu Na continued his campaign of resistance, hoping to force Emperor Yuan to free Wang Lin. He captured Emperor Yuan's generals Ding Daogui (丁道貴) and Li Hongya (李洪雅), executing Ding and making Li a nominal leader of the resistance. However, his subsequent attack on Baling was repelled by Emperor Yuan's cousin Xiao Xun (蕭循) the Marquess of Yifeng. Emperor Yuan then sent Wang Sengbian to assist Xiao Xun, and they attacked Lu together, defeating him and forcing him back to Changsha, which Wang Sengbian then put under siege but was not able to capture quickly. Meanwhile, Xiao Ji's forces were approaching Jiangling, and Emperor Yuan, wanting to pull Wang Sengbian's forces to resist Xiao Ji but feared that he would then lose control over Lu, sent Wang Lin to the frontline to have him to persuade Lu to surrender. Lu was willing to surrender but wanted Wang Lin to take over the command. Eventually, Emperor Yuan agreed, pardoning Wang Lin and putting him back in charge of his original forces. Wang Lin then prepared to respond to Xiao Ji's attack, although Xiao Ji was defeated and killed before he could reach the frontlines.

Meanwhile, Emperor Yuan, while having pardoned Wang Lin, still was apprehensive about the strength of his forces and his rapport with them, made him the governor of Guang Province (廣州, modern central Guangdong), against Wang Lin's wishes to guard Liang's northern borders with Western Wei in spring 554. In fall 554, while Wang Lin was still on the way to Guang Province, Western Wei launched a major attack on Jiangling (which Emperor Yuan had made capital). Upon hearing that Jiangling was under attack, Wang immediately turned his army around and headed for Jiangling, but before he could reach Jiangling, it fell. Around the new year 555, the Western Wei forces put Emperor Yuan to death and declared Emperor Yuan's nephew Xiao Cha the Emperor of Liang (as Emperor Xuan), to be a vassal to Western Wei. Xiao Cha's state is known in history as the Western Liang.

== As independent general ==
Upon hearing of Emperor Yuan's death, Wang Lin took up position at Changsha and declared a public mourning for Emperor Yuan, while sending his general Hou Ping (侯平) to attack Emperor Xuan, refusing to acknowledge him as the new emperor. The generals in the western provinces of the empire supported Wang Lin as their leader.

Meanwhile, also not recognizing Emperor Xuan was Wang Sengbian, who was then at Jiankang and who, along with his lieutenant Chen Baxian, controlled the eastern provinces. Wang Sengbian welcomed the only surviving son of Emperor Yuan, Xiao Fangzhi the Prince of Jin'an to Jiankang, declaring him the Prince of Liang and preparing to next declare him emperor. However, after Northern Qi attacked, Wang Sengbian, fearing further Northern Qi attacks, accepted Emperor Wenxuan of Northern Qi's proposal to make Emperor Yuan's cousin Xiao Yuanming the Marquess of Zhenyang emperor, declaring Xiao Yuanming emperor in fall 555. Wang Lin recognized Xiao Yuanming as emperor, although he remained relatively independent in his military actions. Meanwhile, Emperor Yuan's seven-year-old grandson Xiao Zhuang the Prince of Yongjia—the son of his deceased oldest son Xiao Fangdeng (蕭方等), had been hidden by the Buddhist nun Famu (法幕) and subsequently delivered to Wang Lin. Wang Lin further delivered him to Jiankang.

In fall 555, Chen, displeased over Wang Sengbian's declaration of Xiao Yuanming as emperor, made a surprise attack on Jiankang, killing Wang Sengbian and deposing Xiao Yuanming, instead declaring Xiao Fangzhi emperor (as Emperor Jing). This move drew attacks from several generals loyal to Wang Sengbian, as well as from Northern Qi. During this time, Wang Lin appeared to recognize Emperor Jing as emperor, but at the time was distancing himself from Chen. He also continued fighting with both Western Wei and Emperor Xuan, but after Hou Ping rebelled against him in 556, he felt he was unable to conduct war on all sides. He made nominal submissions to Northern Qi, Western Wei, and Emperor Xuan, suing for peace on all sides. He also sought the return of his wife Lady Cai and heir apparent Wang Yi (王毅), who had been taken captive by Western Wei when Jiangling fell. Emperor Gong of Western Wei created him the Duke of Changsha, and returned his wife and children in 557. When Northern Qi summoned him to its capital Yecheng, Wang Lin refused to go, but did not formally break with Northern Qi. He also refused Emperor Jing's edict to report to Jiankang and instead prepared to attack Chen. Chen therefore sent his generals Hou Andu and Zhou Wenyu to attack Wang, accusing Wang of being a renegade.

Before Hou and Zhou could engage Wang's forces, however, in winter 557, Chen had Emperor Jing yield the throne to him, establishing the Chen Dynasty as Emperor Wu. Having lost the rationale for attacking Wang, Hou and Zhou's forces suffered from low morale, and Wang defeated and captured them, along with most of their forces. He thereafter moved his headquarters from Changsha to Jiangxia. His subsequent campaigns to take over the modern Jiangxi region, however, were indecisive, preventing him from making a decisive attack on Chen. In spring 558, he sought aid from Northern Qi and also requested that Northern Qi return Xiao Zhuang (whom Chen Baxian had sent to Northern Qi as part of a hostage party in 555) to continue the Liang lineage. In spring 558, Northern Qi returned Xiao Zhuang, after Wang had sent his nephew Wang Shubao (王叔寶), along with sons or brothers of the 10 provincial governors under him, to Yecheng as hostages. He declared Xiao Zhuang emperor, and he served as Xiao Zhuang's prime minister, with the capital at Jiangxia.

== Attempt to install Xiao Zhuang as emperor ==
Xiao Zhuang created Wang Lin the Duke of Ancheng. Wang continued his campaign to try to subjugate the semi-independent generals of the modern Jiangxi region, who had been vacillating between pledging allegiance to Xiao Zhuang and allegiance to Chen. In summer 558, Wang's general Yu Xiaoqing (余孝頃) and Fan Meng (樊猛) were able to defeat the chief of those generals, Zhou Di (周迪), but when Zhou agreed to submit, Yu refused, and Zhou's subsequent counterattack defeated their forces, capturing both Yu and Fan, greatly impairing Wang's target of consolidating the power in the region under him. In fall 558, he entered into a peace agreement with Chen, temporarily ending hostilities. Meanwhile, Zhou Wenyu and Hou Andu escaped and rejoined Chen, giving Chen forces a boost.

In summer 559, Chen's Emperor Wu died suddenly. He was succeeded by his nephew Emperor Wen of Chen. Upon hearing this, Wang prepared to launch a major attack on Chen. He left his lieutenant Sun Yang (孫瑒) in command at Jiangxia, while he advanced east on the Yangtze River, heading toward Jiankang, with support from the Northern Qi general Murong Yan (慕容儼). By spring 560, he had reached Dongguan (東關, in modern Chaohu, Anhui), where Chen forces, commanded by Hou Tian, met him, and the forces initially stalemated. Meanwhile, Northern Zhou, the successor state to Western Wei, had heard of Wang's advances and launched an attack on Jiangxia. Wang considered retreating, but decided to continue, hoping to get a decisive victory over Chen forces and then return to lift the siege on Jiangxia. However, in his subsequent engagement against Hou, he was decisively defeated and unable to regroup his forces, and Chen forces also attacked Northern Qi forces and defeated them as well. Wang was forced to flee to Northern Qi, and Xiao Zhuang soon joined him as well. The territory that Wang Lin controlled became divided between Chen and Emperor Xuan, although Chen soon seized the provinces that Emperor Xuan took as well, reducing territory that was controlled by any Liang sovereign to the several cities around Jiangling.

== As Northern Qi general ==
In spring 561, Emperor Xiaozhao of Northern Qi (Emperor Wenxuan's brother) stationed Wang Lin at Hefei, intending to have him gather the men of the region to prepare for an attack on Chen. When Chen's general Pei Jinghui (裴景徽), a son-in-law of Wang Lin's brother Wang Min (王珉), offered to defect, however, Wang Lin hesitated, and Pei, unable to wait for Wang Lin's decision, instead fled and joined him in Northern Qi territory. After this incident, Emperor Xiaozhao made him the governor of Yang Province (揚州, modern central Anhui), to defend Shouyang.

In 562, Wang prepared an attack on Chen, but his deputy Lu Qian (盧潛) believed that time was not right for an attack and instead recommended peace with Chen. They thereafter became rivals, and both of them made submissions to Emperor Wucheng of Northern Qi (Emperor Xiaozhao's brother), accusing each other of inappropriate conduct. Emperor Wucheng summoned Wang back to Yecheng while putting Lu in charge of Shouyang.

Little is known about Wang's activities for the next decade. In 573, Emperor Xuan of Chen (Emperor Wen's brother) sent the general Wu Mingche to launch a major attack on Northern Qi, intending to take the region between the Yangtze and the Huai. Emperor Wucheng's son and successor Gao Wei sent the general Wei Pohu (尉破胡) to defend against Wu's attack, while sending Wang to serve as an advisor to Wei. Wang advised caution, but Wei did not listen to him and was defeated by Wu. Wang just escaped with his life, and when he was on the way back to Yecheng, Gao Wei sent him to Shouyang to gather an army to defend against Chen and created him the Prince of Baling—but also sent Lu to Shouyang as well to assist him, even though it was known that Wang and Lu despised each other—in order to curb Wang's powers. When Wu's forces arrived at Shouyang in fall 573, Wu put Shouyang under siege, quickly capturing the outer city and forcing Northern Qi forces to withdraw into the inner city. Gao Wei sent the general Pi Jinghe (皮景和) to try to lift the siege on Shouyang, but once Pi reached Shouyang's vicinity, he did not dare to engage Wu, and Wu intensified his siege, capturing Shouyang in winter 573. Wang was taken captive.

Initially, Wu was going to deliver Wang to Emperor Xuan. However, Wu became apprehensive when many of his own officers, formerly Wang's subordinates, not only begged for Wang's life to be spared but further gave him gifts. Worried that his own officers might rebel, Wu had Wang executed. It was said that the whole countryside was filled with wailing in mourning of Wang's death.

The historian Li Yanshou (李延寿) commented in the History of Southern Dynasties:

Wang Lin was calm and civil in his expressions, rarely expressing his emotions on his face. His reaction was quick, and his memories were good. He had several thousand officials under him, but he could address each of them by name. His punishments were just, and he did not consider money important -- preferring to value people. His soldiers were faithful to him. While he controlled no territory and was an exile in Yecheng, both the officials and the commoners of Northern Qi praised him for his faithfulness.

He further commented:

Wang Lin was faithful during a time that the dynasty was in a state of confusion. He had great ambitions to reestablish the dynasty and to take vengeance on its behalf. But Heaven favored Chen, and his faithfulness was unable to stem the tide, just as how when a mansion is collapsing, a single column cannot keep it standing.

The historian in Qing Dynasty Zhao Yi commented in his Notes on the Twenty-Two Dynastic Histories:

Wang Lin remained faithful to the Xiao Dynasty (萧梁) even after the substitution of Liang by Chen, struggling through hundreds of battles and finally to his own martyrdom. He, therefore, was no doubt the loyalest loyalist to the Liang Dynasty.
