= Hou Tian =

Chen dynasty general (510–561)

- 侯瑱

Grand Commandant (太尉)
- In office 559–561
- Monarch: Emperor Wen of Chen

Personal details
- Born: 509 Nanchong, Sichuan
- Died: 9 April 561
- Children: Hou Jingzang
- Parent: Hou Hongyuan (father)
- Courtesy name: Boyu (伯玉)
- Peerage: Duke of Lingling Commandery (零陵郡公)
- Posthumous name: Zhuangsu (壯肅)

Hou Tian (510–9 April 561), courtesy name Boyu, was a military general of the Liang and Chen during the Northern and Southern dynasties period. During the Hou Jing Disturbance, he vacillated his allegiance between the competing powers and delivered the final blow to Hou Jing's army while serving under Wang Sengbian. Hou Tian effectively became a semi-independent warlord in the Jiangxi area, but after his followers ousted him from his territory, he went to join the future Emperor Wu of Chen at Jiankang. Under the Chen, he decisively defeated the Hunan warlord, Wang Lin in 560, ending a three-year-long conflict that threatened the dynasty.

Despite his history of defections and betrayals, Hou Tian was one of the few southern commanders at the time who boasted victories against both the rival Northern Qi and Northern Zhou, and played pivotal roles in the suppression of Hou Jing and Wang Lin. After his death in 561, he was posthumously honoured and enshrined in Emperor Wu's ancestral temple.

== Early life and career ==
Hou Tian was a native of Chongguo County (充國縣), Baxi Commandery (巴西郡; northwest of present-day Nanbu CountySichuan). His father was Hou Hongyuan (侯弘遠), a prominent noble in the Western Shu region. In an unspecified year, the rebel, Zhang Wen'e (張文萼) occupied Mount Baiya (白崖山; in present-day Libo County, Guizhou) with 10,000 soldiers. The Inspector of Yi province and the Prince of Poyang, Xiao Fan ordered Hou Hongyuan to quell the disturbance, but he was killed in battle. Hou Tian swore to avenge his father's death and led the vanguard in every battle against the rebels, eventually killing Zhang Wen'e. His deeds in the campaign earned him renown, and Xiao Fan rewarded him by making him a general.

During the remainder of Xiao Fan's tenure in Yi province, Hou Tian was often sent to subdue the non-Chinese tribes living in the mountains and valleys that had not yet submitted. For his merits, Hou was appointed the Adjutant of the Inner Troops and Administrator of Jinkang. When Xiao Fan was appointed Inspector of Yong province in 541, Hou was made Transcending Martial General and Administrator of Fengyi, and when Xiao was garrisoned at Hefei in 548, Hou also followed him there.

== Hou Jing Disturbance ==
=== Seizing Yuzhang ===
In the same year he was transferred to Hefei, the general, Hou Jing besieged Emperor Wu of Liang at the capital of Jiankang. Hou Tian followed Xiao Fan's son, Xiao Si (蕭嗣) to rescue Jiankang, but after the city fell in 549, they returned to Hefei and followed Xiao Fan to Pengcheng after his plan to attack Jiankang with the Eastern Wei did not come to fruition. In early 550, the Interior Minister of Linchuan and Prince of Shixing, Xiao Yi attacked the rebellious Administrator of Yuzhang, Zhuang Tie (莊鐵). At Xiao Si's urging, Xiao Fan sent Hou Tian to rescue Zhuang. Xiao Yi's forces were destroyed by Hou, and he was killed in battle.

In the middle of 550, Zhuang Tie was once again under attack, this time by the Prince of Shouyang, Xiao Daxin. Xiao Fan sent Hou Tian with 5,000 soldiers to reinforce Zhuang, but while he did so, both Xiao Fan and Xiao Si died back in Pengcheng as the city was lost to Hou Jing's general, Ren Yue. Xiao Daxin also surrendered to Ren, so Hou Tian remained under Zhuang Tie's care. However, Zhuang was deeply suspicious of him, and Hou, feeling uneasy, pretended to invite him over to discuss a matter before killing him and occupying Yuzhang commandery (豫章郡; around present-day Nanchang, Jiangxi) for himself.

=== Joining and betraying Hou Jing ===
Soon, Hou Jing sent his subordinate Yu Qing (于慶) southward to conquer territory all the way to Yuzhang. As his towns and cities fell one by one, Hou Tian was pressured into surrendering to Yu Qing, who then sent him to Hou Jing. Because the two shared the same family names, Hou Jing regarded Hou Tian as a clan member and treated him well, though still demanded that he give his wife, children and younger brothers as hostages. Hou Tian then accompanied Yu Qing in pacifying the commanderies south of Li Lake (蠡湖; southeast of present-day Wuxi, Jiangsu).

In 551, the Liang forces won a great victory over Hou Jing at Baling (巴陵; in modern-day Yueyang, Hunan), capturing his generals, Ren Yue and Song Zixian. Responding to their success, Hou Tian had Hou Jing's followers in Yuzhang killed and refused Yu Qing entry into his city. In turn, Hou Jing had his wife, children and younger brothers all executed. Emperor Yuan of Liang appointed Hou as Martial Minister General and Inspector of Southern Yan province, as well as bestowed him the title of Marquis of Pi County.

Hou Tian then followed the Liang commander, Wang Sengbian in his campaign against Hou Jing, leading the vanguard and defeating the rebels in all his battles. He also captured the two garrisons of Nanling and Quetou (鵲頭; in present-day Tongling, Anhui). After Liang forces recaptured Jiankang in 552, Hou Jing fled towards Wu Commandery, so Wang ordered Hou Tian to pursue him with 5,000 elite troops. Hou Tian caught up with Hou Jing at Wusongjiang. At the time, Hou Jing still had 200 boats and several thousand of men. Hou Tian routed them, capturing several of Hou Jing's generals and all of his weapons. One of these generals was Peng Jun (彭雋), who Hou Tian had his abdomen cut open and intestines pulled out. Seeing that Peng was still not dead, Hou collected the intestines before beheading him.

After the battle, Hou Jing was only left with several dozen men and a single boat. Soon, he was assassinated by a subordinate as he attempted to flee into the sea. Hou Tian later marched to Qiantang (錢塘; in present-day Hangzhou, Zhejiang), where he received the surrender of Hou Jing's generals, Xie Daren (謝答仁) and Lü Zirong (呂子榮). For his contributions in ending the rebellion, Hou Tian was rewarded with the office of the Inspector of Southern Yu province and stationed at Gushu (姑孰, in present-day Dangtu County, Anhui).

== Service under Wang Sengbian ==
=== Repelling Guo Yuanjian ===
After Hou Jing's rebellion, Hou Tian continued to serve as a subordinate general under Wang Sengbian. In 553, the Northern Qi dynasty sent the general, Guo Yuanjian (郭元建) with 20,000 naval troops from Ruxu (濡須; north of present-day Wuwei, Anhui) to invade Jiankang. Wang dispatched Hou with 3,000 armoured troops to fortify Dongguan and resist Guo Yuanjian. Hou defeated Guo at Dongguan (東關, in modern Chaohu, Anhui), drowning many of his troops. Hou was then appointed General Who Guards the North for his deeds. Not long after, the rebellious Liang Administrator of Jian'an, Xu Foshou (徐佛受) was ousted from his territory by his own followers and sought refuge with Hou Tian, but was killed by Hou instead.

=== Retrieving Xiao Fangzhi ===
In 554, the Inspector of Qin province, Yan Chaoda (嚴超達) laid siege to the Northern Qi territory of Jing province (涇州; around present-day central Anhui). Wang Sengbian ordered Hou Tian and Zhang Biao (張彪) to lead their forces from Shiliang (石樑; in present-day Tianchang, Anhui) to reinforce him. However, the two delayed their march, and after Yan was defeated by the Northern Qi general, Duan Shao, they withdrew to Qin Commandery (秦郡; in present-day Nanjing, Jiangsu).

Later that year, the Western Wei dynasty launched an assault on Emperor Yuan at Jiangling. Wang sent Hou Tian to rescue the emperor, but before he could arrive, the city and emperor were captured by the Western Wei. Hou instead went to Jiujiang to retrieve Emperor Yuan's son, the Prince of Jin’an Xiao Fangzhi and escorted him back to Jiankang, where he was conferred imperial authority by Wang Sengbian and Chen Baxian. Xiao Fangzhi appointed Hou Tian as Palace Attendant, Chief Controller of Military Affairs in the four provinces of Jiang, Jin, Wu and Qi as well as granted tally. He was also enfeoffed the Duke of Kangle County and given the title of General of Chariots and Cavalry.

=== Siege of Ying province ===
In January or February 555, the Liang Minister of Works, Lu Fahe surrendered Ying province to the Northern Qi. Hou Tian brought his army west to attack him, but withdrew as Lu and his forces left the province for the north. Just then, the Northern Qi sent the general, Murong Yan to govern Ying province from Xiashou (夏首; south of present-day Shashi, Hubei), so Hou Tian returned west to attack him by land and water. He was also joined by forces led by Ren Yue, Xu Shipu and Xiao Xun.

As Hou Tian's forces laid siege to Murong Yan's city, he and Ren Yue built several miles of reed barriers on Yingwu Islet (鹦鹉洲; in present-day Wuhan, Hubei) to block the waterways, spreading panic among the city defenders. However, the weather was stormy at the time, and there were strong winds and waves that constantly broke the reeds, which encouraged the defenders who saw this as divine intervention. While Ren Yue moved south of the city with the siege weapons, Hou Tian camped north of the city, burning down the city walls and destroying the local properties as he intended to attack the city from two sides. However, Murong Yan sallied out and defeated them, capturing 500 of their soldiers. Later, Hou and Ren were joined by Xiao Xun with 50,000 troops, and they launched a night attack on the city. They were still unable to make a break through, and by dawn, they issued a retreat. Murong's forces pursued them, killing one of Hou's top generals, Zhang Baishi (張白石). Hou offered Murong a thousand taels of gold for the return of Zhang's head, but Murong rejected him.

In May or June, Hou Tian and the others returned and besieged the city again with their full force while Murong continued to hold out despite food shortages in the city. That month, Wang Sengbian reached an agreement with Emperor Wenxuan of Northern Qi to install the pro-Qi Xiao Yuanming to the throne in exchange for peace. As a result, Wang ordered Hou Tian to withdraw back to Yuzhang while Emperor Wenxuan agreed to cede Ying province back to Liang.

=== Surrender to Chen Baxian ===
Later that year, Hou Tian was on a campaign under Wang's brother, Wang Sengyin (王僧愔) to attack the Inspector of Guang province, Xiao Bo in the south. However, during the campaign, Wang Sengbian was suddenly assassinated by Chen Baxian in a coup. Wang Sengyin led his army back towards the capital, but as he did, he secretly planned to seize Hou Tian's forces for himself. When Hou discovered his plan, he had Wang and his subordinates arrested first. He soon released Wang, allowing him to flee to the Northern Qi.

Chen installed Xiao Fangzhi as the new emperor, and in 556, the Liang court under him promoted Hou Tian to Minister of Palace with Equal Rank to the Three Excellencies while allowing him to retain his original positions. At the time, Hou occupied the central region and possessed a powerful military force. Though he outwardly presented himself as a vassal, he had no intention of following the new court due to his past services to Wang Sengbian.

Meanwhile, the general Wang Lin refused to submit himself to Chen Baxian and took power over the Hunan region. He appointed his general Yu Xiaoqing as Prefect of Yuzhang, but because Yuzhang was controlled by Hou Tian, Yu built a separate fortified city in Xinwu County (新吳縣; in present-day Fengxin County, Jiangxi) to confront him. Hou led all his troops to confront Yu, leaving the wives and children of his soldiers back in Yuzhang where his cousin, Hou Yun (侯奫) managed affairs in his absence. From summer to winter, Hou Tian besieged Yu but was unable to breach through his city. He kept himself supplied by harvesting all of Yu's crops.

Back in Yuzhang, Hou Yun had a falling out with his subordinate, Hou Fang'er (侯方兒), who led his forces to attack him. Hou Fang'er seized Hou Tian's concubines, gold and jade before surrendering to Chen Baxian. With the loss of his base, Hou Tian's army collapsed. He quickly returned to Yuzhang, but the inhabitants refused to let him in. He then fled to Pengcheng, where he sought refuge with his subordinate, Jiao Sengdu. Jiao advised him that they should surrender to the Northern Qi, but Hou believed that Chen Baxian was a magnanimous ruler and would surely forgive him. Thus, Hou went to Chen's palace to apologize, and Chen restored him to his title.

== Service under the Chen dynasty ==
=== Campaign against Wang Lin ===
In 557, Chen Baxian usurped the throne and established the Chen dynasty, posthumously becoming known as Emperor Wu of Chen. He appointed Hou Tian as a Palace Attendant and General of Chariots and Cavalry. In 558, Hou Tian was promoted to Minister of Works. At the time, Emperor Wu was met with a crisis, as his two top generals, Zhou Wenyu and Hou Andu were both captured in battle by Wang Lin at Dunkou (沌口, in modern Wuhan, Hubei). With no one else capable enough to defeat Wang Lin, Emperor Wu had to appoint Hou Tian as Chief Controller of military affairs of the Western Expedition and garrisoned him at Liangshan (梁山; south of present-day He County, Anhui).

In 559, Emperor Wu died and was succeeded by his nephew, Emperor Wen of Chen, who promoted Hou Tian to Grand Commandant after his ascension. When Wang Lin's forces reached Zhakou (柵口; southwest of present-day Wuwei, Anhui), Hou Tian was made Chief Controller with Hou Andu and others serving as his subordinates. Hou and Wang engaged in a stalemate for more than a 100 days, with neither side able to get the upper hand.

In 560, the spring waters of Dongguan rose slightly, which allowed ships to pass. In orderly fashion, Wang Lin brought his troops downstream on ships from Hefei and Canghu, showing great momentum. Hou Tian led his forces to Shoukan Islet (獸檻洲; northeast of present-day Fanchang, Anhui), so Wang Lin deployed his ships from the west bank of the Yangzi River and anchored them across the islet. The next day, the two armies clashed, and Hou forced Wang to slightly fall back to the west bank. In the evening, a strong northeast wind arose, blowing away Wang Lin's ships and damaging them. A number of ships sank into the sand, and many Wang's men drowned. The waves were too high for the drifted ships to return to shore, and reportedly a meteor fell into Wang's camp. By dawn, the wind had calmed and Wang returned to shore to repair his remaining ships. No longer willing to go on the offensive, he blocked the mouth of the river with reed boats and surrounded the riverbank with bulwarks.

At the time, the Northern Zhou general, Shi Ning arrived upstream to attack Wang Lin. Hearing this news, Hou Tian predicted that Wang will not hold out for long, so he withdrew his troops to the lakeside. Shi Ning soon besieged Ying province, and Wang was forced to lead his ships downstream, anchoring a few miles away from Wuhu. The following day, the Northern Qi sent tens of thousands of troops under Liu Boqiu (劉伯球) and Murong Zihui (慕容子會) to reinforce Wang as he marched towards Liangshan to bypass the Chen army and seized the strategic terrain. Hou Tian ordered his troops to prepare breakfast and divided his troops at the tail end of Wuhu Islet, where he anticipated for Wang's arrival.

Just as the battle was about to begin, a gentle breeze blew from the southeast, which Hou Tian took advantage of by employing fire to set Wang Lin's navy ablaze. Hou's general, Zhang Zhaoda, rode a large warship in the middle of the Yangzi and launched boulders onto the enemy ships before he was joined by the smaller ships. The small ships were protected with cowhides as they rammed into the enemy boats and throw over molten iron. Wang's forces were decisively defeated; his infantry on the west bank trampled on one another while his horses became trapped in the mud, forcing two or three out of ten of his cavalrymen to abandon their mount and escape. Along with Liu Boqiu and Murong Zihui, Hou Tian captured tens of thousands of the enemy soldiers as well as all their ships and equipments. Wang and his confidants managed to break through the encirclement on a small boat and fled to Pengcheng. When their attempt to regroup their scattered soldiers failed, they decided to flee to the Northern Qi with their families.

=== Battle of Xiang province ===
After Wang Lin's defeat, Hou Tian was appointed Chief Controller of the five provinces of Xiang, Ba, Ying, Jiang and Wu and garrisoned at Pengcheng. In September or October 560, the Northern Zhou general, Dugu Sheng (獨孤盛) led his navy to attack Ba and Xiang (湘州; in modern Hunan), advancing by land and water with Heruo Dun. Hou Tian departed from Xunyang to oppose him, and he was joined by Xu Du at Baqiu.

Due to the autumn floods, the Northern Zhou forces were cut off from their supplies, but Heruo was able to conceal this fact from Hou Tian. Falling for the deception, Hou was wary and reluctant to rush into battle. Hou received the surrender of several defectors from the Northern Zhou camp, but after an instance which turned out to be an ambush by Heruo that killed a whole detachment of his soldiers, he refused to accept anymore of them and would attack them instead.

In December 560, Hou Tian fought Dugu Sheng at Xijiangkou (西江口; north of present-day Yueyang, Hunan), eventually defeating him at Yangye Islet (杨叶洲; northwest of Yueyang) where he captured Dugu's men, weapons and all of his warships. Dugu withdrew ashore and built a city to defend himself. Meanwhile, the Chen court also dispatched Hou Andu to assist Hou Tian in his campaign. Soon, the Northern Zhou commander in Baling, Yuchi Xian (尉遲憲) surrendered to Chen, and Dugu and his remaining followers secretly fled from Yangyezhou. Hou was thus left with Heruo, and the two were locked in a stalemate for a long time. In January or February 561, Hou offered to lend Heruo his boats, allowing him to cross the river and return to the north. Heruo was worried that Hou had set up a trap and asked him to fall back a hundred li first. Hou agreed, leaving his boats and ordering his troops to withdraw. After Heruo's withdrawal, the whole of Xiang province was returned to the Chen.

=== Death and posthumous honours ===
In February or March 561, Hou Tian was appointed Chief Controller of military affairs of the six provinces of Xiang, Gui, Ying, Ba, Wu and Yuan, General of Chariots and Cavalry and Inspector of Xiang province. He was also granted the title of Duke of Lingling while his other official titles remained the same. Soon, however, Hou submitted a memorial requesting to return to the capital due to illness. On 9 April 561, he died on his way to Jiankang.

Hou Tian was posthumously appointed Palace Attendant, Grand General of Agile Cavalry and Grand Marshal. He was also given the posthumous name of Zhuangsu (壯肅), and later that year, he was enshrined in the temple of Emperor Wu along with Zhou Wenyu, Hou Andu and others. He was succeeded by his son, Hou Jingzang (侯淨藏), who was married to Emperor Wen of Chen's daughter, Princess Fuyang.

== Sources ==
- Book of Chen
- History of the Southern Dynasties
- Book of Northern Qi
- Book of Zhou
- Zizhi Tongjian
