= Han Zigao =

Chinese general

- Born: Han Manzi; 538; Jingshi Jiankang, China
- Died: 567 (aged 28–29); China
- Occupation: General
- Father: Han Yanqing

Han Zigao (Chinese: 韩子高; pinyin: Hán Zigāo; 538–567), formerly known as Han Manzi (韓蠻子), was a Chinese general. He is recorded in history for his beauty and for being the favorite lover of Emperor Wen of Chen.

== Biography ==
Han Zigao was born as Han Manzi in 538. He was born in Jingshi Jiankang (now Nanjing, Jiangsu). His father, Han Yanqing, was a farmer.

Around 554, when he was 16 years old, he met the future Emperor Wen of Chen, by then only a general. After entering Chen's service, the last gave him a new name, Zigao, and made him his personal assistant. Not long after, Han Zigao became his favorite lover.

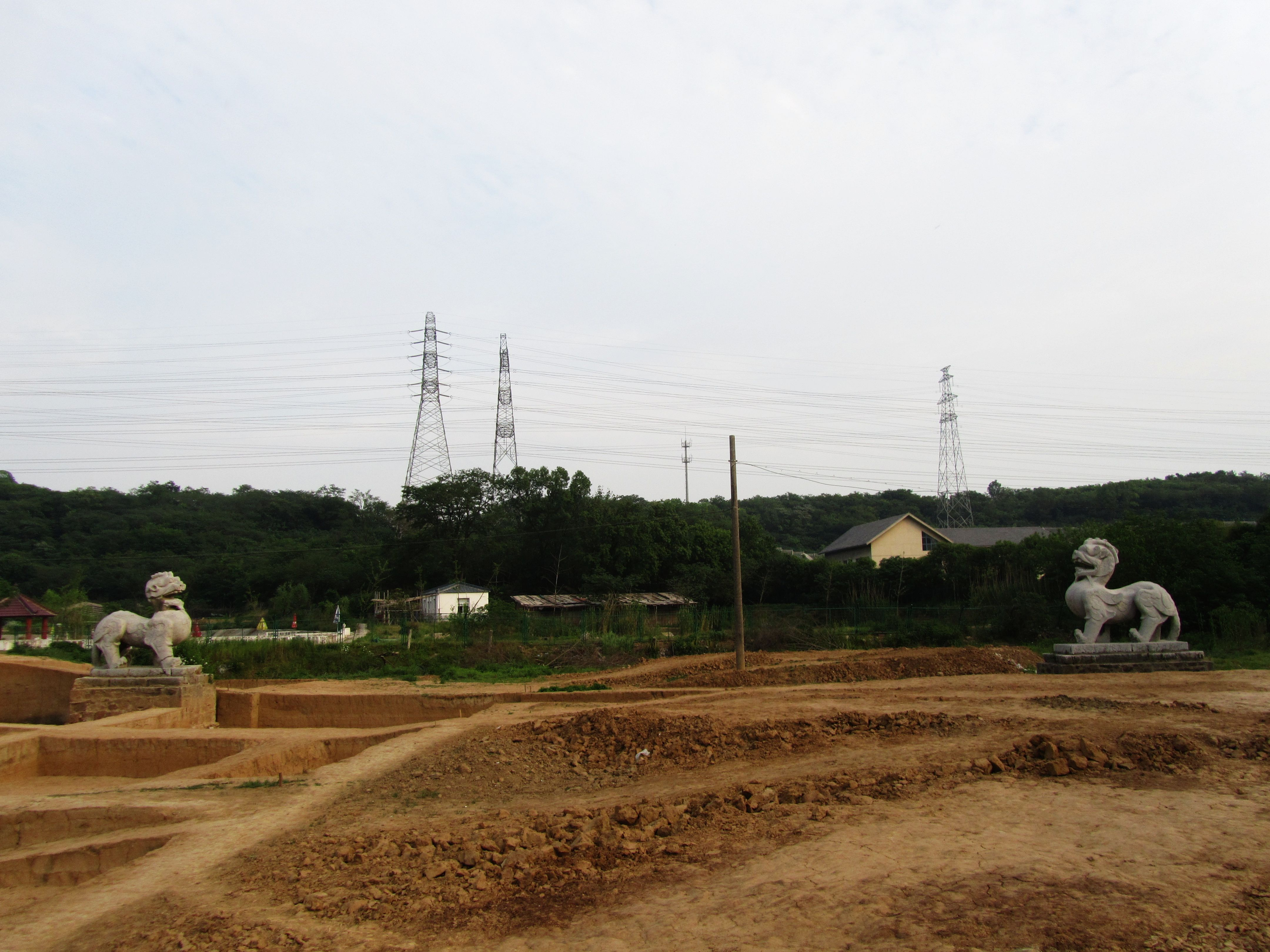
The two pixiu statues outside Emperor Chen's tomb, believed to represent Emperor Chen and Han Zigao.

By nature, Han Zigao was respectful and cautious, serving Chen Qian with all his heart and soul, carrying a sword to defend Chen Qian, and serving Chen Qian wine and food. When Chen Qian was anxious, Han Zigao could always comprehend the reason. After getting older, he learned riding and shooting skills, and being brave and decisive, soon became a commander. Chen Qian was very pleased with him and never let him go away. Chen Qian once dreamed that he was riding a horse in the mountains: the road was dangerous, and he was about to fall down the mountain, but was saved by Han Zigao. Han Zigao indeed saved his life later, during a night attack on their camp.

Chen Qian became an Emperor in 559 and made Han Zigao a general. Being very successful in his campaigns, Han Zigao was considered the best general of the state and received several promotions. In the sixth year of Tianjia (565), he was recalled to the imperial court to serve as a general of the Right guard, and went to the capital Jiankang (now Nanjing, Jiangsu) to guard the emperor's palace. When Chen Qian became seriously ill, Han Zigao spent his time with him serving him medicine, until Chen Qian died in 566.

Less than a year after Chen Qian's death, in order to protect Chen Qian's son, young emperor Chen Fei, Han Zigao plotted with the official Dao Zhongju against Chen Qian's younger brother and future emperor Chen Xu, whose power in the imperial court began to worry some officials. The plot was however exposed, and Han Zigao was forced to commit suicide as punishment. He was thirty years old. His father Han Yanqing and his nephews were pardoned.

Outside the tomb of Chen Qian, discovered in 2013, two statues of pixiu were found, different from the usual male and female design, since both of them are male. Female counterpart of this mythological species are known as bìxié, and male as tiānlù; the only difference being that the females have a pair of horns on their heads.

== In popular culture ==
He was first recorded in Book of Chen, the official history of the Chen dynasty.

A web film based on Han Zigao's story, Han Zi Gao - The Male Queen, was released in 2016. The film was directed by Li Jinlun and stars Wang Yichen and Shao Shuai as Han Zigao and Chen, respectively.

== See also ==
- Emperor Wen of Chen
- Chen dynasty
