= Emperor Jing of Liang =

Emperor of Liang dynasty from 555 to 557

Emperor Jing of Liang 梁敬帝

Emperor of Liang dynasty
- Reign: November 1, 555 – November 12, 557
- Predecessor: Xiao Yuanming
- Born: c. 543
- Died: May 5, 558
- Consorts: Lady Wang of Langya
Full name
- Family name: Xiāo (蕭); Given name: Fāngzhì (方智)
Era dates
- Shàotài (紹泰): 555–556; Tàipíng (太平): 556–557
Posthumous name
- Emperor Jìng (敬皇帝, lit. "the alert Emperor")
- Dynasty: Liang Dynasty
- Father: Emperor Yuan
- Mother: Xia Wangfeng

Emperor Jing of Liang (Chinese: 梁敬帝; 543 – 5 May 558), personal name Xiao Fangzhi (蕭方智), courtesy name Huixiang (慧相), nickname Fazhen (法真), was an emperor of the Chinese Liang Dynasty. As the only surviving son of Emperor Yuan, he was declared emperor by the general Chen Baxian in 555, but in 557 Chen forced him to yield the throne and established Chen Dynasty. In 558, Chen had him killed.

== Background ==
Xiao Fangzhi was born in 544, when his father Xiao Yi was the Prince of Xiangdong during the reign of his grandfather, the founding emperor Emperor Wu. His mother was Xiao Yi's concubine Lady Xia. He was Xiao Yi's ninth son. He was created the Marquess of Xingliang in 549, probably by Xiao Yi, exercising acting imperial powers, as that year, the capital Jiankang fell to the rebel general Hou Jing, who took Emperor Wu and his crown prince, Xiao Fangzhi's uncle Xiao Gang hostage, and the subsequent acts of Emperor Wu and Xiao Gang (who succeeded to the throne as Emperor Jianwen later that year when Emperor Wu died) were not recognized as genuine imperial edicts.

In 552, after Xiao Yi had defeated Hou and taken the throne at his headquarters of Jiangling (江陵, in modern Jingzhou, Hubei) as Emperor Yuan, he created Xiao Fangzhi the Prince of Jin'an, and honored Xiao Fangzhi's mother Consort Xia as the Princess Dowager of Jin'an. In 553, Xiao Fangzhi was made a general and the governor of Jiang Province (江州, modern Jiangxi), although, because he was just nine years old, actual gubernatorial authorities were probably carried out by staff members.

In winter 554, Jiangling, then the capital, fell to Western Wei forces. Emperor Yuan was captured and subsequently executed around the near year 555, as were all of the then-surviving brothers of Xiao Fangzhi. Western Wei created Xiao Fangzhi's cousin Xiao Cha Emperor of Liang. However, most of the remaining Liang provinces were under the control of Emperor Yuan's general Wang Sengbian and Wang's lieutenant Chen Baxian, and they refused to recognize Xiao Cha as emperor. Rather, they welcomed Xiao Fangzhi to the old capital Jiankang, initially offering him the title of Taizai (太宰) and had him formally exercise imperial power. In spring 555, they declared him the Prince of Liang and had him take the throne—but not with imperial title.

Meanwhile, Emperor Wenxuan of Northern Qi had his own designs on putting an emperor on the Liang throne who would be friendly to Northern Qi. He created Emperor Yuan's cousin Xiao Yuanming the Marquess of Zhenyang, who had been captured by Northern Qi's predecessor state Eastern Wei in 547, and he sent his brother Gao Huan (高渙) the Prince of Shangdang to escort Xiao Yuanming back to Liang. Wang initially rejected Emperor Wenxuan's and Xiao Yuanming's overtures, but after his forces suffered several defeats at Northern Qi's hands, became apprehensive and decided to accept Xiao Yuanming as emperor, after extracting a promise from Xiao Yuanming to create Xiao Fangzhi crown prince. In summer 555, Xiao Yuanming arrived at Jiankang to take the throne, although military authorities remained in Wang's and Chen's hands. Xiao Yuanming created Xiao Fangzhi crown prince, pursuant to his promise.

In fall 555, however, Chen, displeased at Xiao Yuanming's becoming emperor, made a surprise attack on Jiankang from his headquarters at Jingkou (京口, in modern Zhenjiang, Jiangsu). Wang was caught by surprise and was captured and executed by Chen. Xiao Yuanming abdicated, and Xiao Fangzhi took the throne (as Emperor Jing).

== Reign ==
Emperor Jing honored his mother Consort Xia as empress dowager and his wife Princess Wang as empress. However, actual powers were in Chen Baxian's hands.

War broke out as soon as Emperor Jing took the throne, as generals loyal to Wang, including Xu Sihui (徐嗣徽), Ren Yue (任約), Hou Tian, Wang's son-in-law Du Kan (杜龕), and brother Wang Sengzhi (王僧智), all rose to resist Chen, and Xu and Ren sought Northern Qi aid. In winter 555, Northern Qi forces crossed the Yangtze River into Liang territory to aid Xu and Ren, but soon, the armies stalemated near Jiankang. Around the new year 556, Chen put Shitou, a heavy fortified fortress in Jiankang's vicinity, which the Northern Qi general Liu Damo (柳達摩) had taken, under siege, and Liu sought peace. While Chen did not favor peace with Northern Qi, most imperial officials did, and Chen agreed to peace, sending his nephew Chen Tanlang (陳曇朗), Emperor Jing's nephew Xiao Zhuang the Prince of Yongjia, and Wang Min (王珉), the son of the key official Wang Chong (王沖), to Northern Qi as hostages, permitting Northern Qi forces to withdraw, and Xu and Ren went with them to Northern Qi. In spring 556, Du was either defeated or surrendered, and Chen killed him. Wang Sengzhi fled to Northern Qi, and the Jiankang region was largely pacified. Soon, Hou, who controlled Jiang Province, submitted as well.

Soon, however, Northern Qi forces, along with Xu and Ren's forces, attacked again. They arrived at Jiankang again in summer 556. Chen defeated them several times, however, and cut off their food supplies, leading to a major rout. Xu was captured and executed, as were a large number of Northern Qi generals. Chen had Emperor Jing create him the Duke of Changcheng, and then the greater title of Duke of Yixing. The general Wang Lin, who controlled Xiang (湘州, modern Hunan) and Ying (郢州, modern eastern Hubei) Provinces, however, resisted Chen's orders for him to report to Jiankang, although he still recognized Emperor Jing as emperor.

In spring 557, Xiao Bo (蕭勃), the governor of Guang Province (廣州, modern Guangdong), apparently believing that Chen was about to seize the throne, rebelled and tried to advance north. Soon, however, Chen's general Zhou Wenyu captured Xiao Bo's general Ouyang Wei (歐陽頠), and Xiao Bo's own generals rose and killed him.

In summer 557, Chen had Emperor Jing create him the Duke of Chen. In winter 557, he had Emperor Jing create him the Prince of Chen, and then three days later, yield the throne to him, establishing Chen Dynasty with Chen as its Emperor Wu.

== Death ==
Chen created Emperor Jing as the Prince of Jiangyin. However, in summer 558, he sent assassins to kill the former emperor. As the young emperor was without sons, his cousin Xiao Jiqing (蕭季卿) was created the Prince of Jiangyin to succeed him.

== Consorts ==
- Empress, of the Wang clan of Langya (皇后 琊瑯王氏)

Regnal titles
Preceded by Xiao Yuanming (Marquess of Zhenyang)	Emperor of Liang Dynasty (Eastern); 555–557	Succeeded by Xiao Zhuang (Prince of Yongjia)
Preceded by Xiao Yuanming (Marquess of Zhenyang)	Emperor of China (Southern); 555–557	Succeeded by Xiao Zhuang (Prince of Yongjia)
Preceded by Xiao Yuanming (Marquess of Zhenyang)	Emperor of China (Southeastern); 555–557	Succeeded by Emperor Wu of Chen
