= Wang Sengbian =

Chinese military general (died 555)

Wang Sengbian (Chinese: 王僧辯) (5th century – 27 October 555), courtesy name Juncai (君才), was a Chinese military general and regent of the Liang dynasty. He came to prominence as the leading general under Emperor Yuan (Xiao Yi)'s campaigns against the rebel general Hou Jing and other competitors for the Liang throne, and after Emperor Yuan was defeated by Western Wei in 554 and killed around the new year 555 became the de facto regent over the remaining provinces of Liang. He made Xiao Yuanming the Marquess of Zhenyang, a cousin of Emperor Yuan and a candidate for the throne favored by Northern Qi, emperor, but four months later, his subordinate Chen Baxian carried out a coup, killing him and deposing Xiao Yuanming.

== Early career ==
Wang Sengbian's father Wang Shennian (王神念; 451-525) was originally from Northern Wei's Taiyuan Commandery (太原郡, roughly modern Taiyuan, Shanxi). When he was Northern Wei's governor of Yingchuan Commandery (潁川郡, roughly modern Xuchang, Henan), he, along with Wang Sengbian and his brothers, surrendered to the Liang dynasty on 1 March 508. Wang Shennian was created the Marquess of Nancheng (南城县侯), and became successively the governor of several commanderies and eventually the governor of Qīng Prefecture and Jizhou. Wang Sengbian was Wang Shennian's second son. He had one known older brother, Wang Zunye (王遵業) and four known younger brothers, Wang Senglüe (王僧略), Wang Sengzhi (王僧智), Wang Sengxiu (王僧修) and Wang Sengyin (王僧愔).

In his youth, Wang Sengbian was known for being studious, particularly of the Zuo Zhuan. He was also well-versed in military strategy, although he was noted for not being physically strong for a soldier. When Xiao Yi, then the Prince of Xiangdong, was made the governor of Jiang Province (江州, modern Jiangxi) by his father Emperor Wu in 540, Wang Sengbian served on his military staff, and in 542, when a member of Ancheng Commandery (安成, roughly modern Anfu County, Ji'an, Jiangxi), Liu Jinggong (劉敬躬) rebelled, Xiao Yi sent Wang and Cao Ziying (曹子郢) against Liu. Wang captured Liu, and also suppressed the aborigines of the region, and thereafter became well known. When Xiao Yi was made governor of Jing Province (荊州, modern central and western Hubei) in 547, Wang followed him to Jing Province and was made the governor of Jingling Commandery (竟陵, roughly modern Jingmen, Hubei).

== As Xiao Yi's general during the Hou Jing Disturbance ==
In 548, when Hou Jing, formerly an Eastern Wei general, rebelled against Emperor Wu and quickly put the capital Jiankang under siege, Xiao Yi did not personally lead forces to aid Jiankang; rather, he sent his heir apparent Xiao Fangdeng (蕭方等) and Wang Sengbian. They arrived in Jiankang's vicinity in spring 549, and accepted command, as did the generals of the other provincial forces, of the general Liu Zhongli (柳仲禮). However, Liu, after a battle in spring 549 where he was nearly killed, became hesitant to engage Hou's forces, and Hou was able to continue sieging the palace, where Emperor Wu's own forces had been forced to defend themselves. When the palace fell in summer 549, allowing Hou to take Emperor Wu and his crown prince Xiao Gang hostage, and Hou subsequently forced Emperor Wu to issue an edict disbanding the provincial troops under Liu's command, Wang and Pei Zhigao (裴之高) suggested Liu to make one last stand against Hou, but Liu took no action, and the provincial forces, including Xiao Fangdeng's, largely returned to their home provinces, although Wang, along with Liu and several other generals, surrendered to Hou. Hou's strategist Wang Wei suggested to Hou that Wang Sengbian should be detained, but Hou decided against it and allowed Wang Sengbian to return to Jingling. Once Wang Sengbian returned to Jingling, he again was under Xiao Yi's command.

Soon thereafter, Xiao Yi was in a dispute with his nephew Xiao Yu (蕭譽) the Prince of Hedong and governor of Xiang Province (湘州, modern Hunan), who refused to follow his orders. Initially, he sent Xiao Fangdeng against Xiao Yu, but Xiao Fangdeng was defeated and killed in battle. He then ordered Wang Sengbian and Bao Quan (鮑泉) to attack Xiao Yu and further ordered them to leave immediately. Wang, who was then at Xiao Yi's headquarters in Jiangling, wanted to wait for Jingling Commandery troops to arrive, and so he and Bao personally visited Xiao Yi to request a delay. Xiao Yi, suspecting Wang of not committing to his cause, rebuked Wang and unsheathed his sword, cutting Wang in the thigh and then imprisoning him. Wang's mother immediately visited Xiao Yi, crying and blaming herself for not disciplining her son correctly, asking for Xiao Yi's forgiveness. Xiao Yi calmed down and gave her medicine for healing wounds, and she used the medicine to help her son recover, but Xiao Yi still kept Wang imprisoned. Bao, in fear, did not persist in his request and left to attack Xiao Yu immediately.

In fall 549, with Bao putting Xiao Yu's headquarters at Changsha under siege but unable to capture it, Xiao Yu's brother Xiao Cha the Prince of Yueyang, trying to save his brother, attacked Jiangling from his headquarters at Xiangyang. Xiao Yi, in fear, sent messengers to consult with Wang, still in prison, on how to deal with Xiao Cha. Wang made several suggestions, and Xiao Yi released him and made him the commander of Jiangling's defense forces. Wang was able to repel Xiao Cha's attacks, and when Xiao Cha's general Du An (杜岸) defected and attacked Xiangyang, Xiao Cha was forced to withdraw. Xiao Yi subsequently sent Wang to replace Bao as the commander against Xiao Yu, and Wang, when taking over command from Bao, was compelled to lock Bao in chains, despite his friendship with Bao, to avoid an appearance of disobeying Xiao Yi, although Xiao Yi later released Bao.

In summer 550, Changsha finally fell. Wang captured Xiao Yu and beheaded him, delivering his head to Xiao Yi, who subsequently returned the head to Changsha for burial. Wang took Xiao Yu's general Zhou Tiehu (周鐵虎) captive, and was about to execute Zhou, who had defeated Xiao Fangdeng, by boiling him to death. When Zhou yelled, "Hou Jing has not yet been destroyed. Why kill a brave soldier?" Wang was impressed by Zhou and released him, making him a key subordinate.

In fall 550, with Xiao Yi's older brother Xiao Guan (蕭綸) the Prince of Shaoyang reorganizing his forces at Jiangxia (江夏, in modern Wuhan, Hubei) and planning to attack Hou, Xiao Yi was displeased because he saw Xiao Guan as a potential competitor for the throne. He therefore sent Wang and Bao toward Jiangxia, claiming to be merely welcoming Xiao Guan and making Xiao Guan the governor of Xiang Province. As Wang approached Jiangxia, Xiao Guan sent Wang a rebuke that stated, "You are a general who killed a man's nephew previously for him, and now you are killing his brother for him. If you use these methods to gain power, you will be rejected by the people." Wang forwarded the letter to Xiao Yi, who ordered him to launch an attack on Xiao Guan. Xiao Guan, instead of engaging him, abandoned Jiangxia and fled. Wang took Ying Province (郢州, modern eastern Hubei).

In summer 551, Xiao Yi commissioned Wang with a substantial force to have him attack Hou. After Wang departed from Jiangling, however, news was received that Hou's forces under the general Ren Yue (任約) had captured Jiangxia, and Ren and Hou were approaching Jiangling. Wang stopped at Baling (巴陵, in modern Yueyang, Hunan) and fortified it against a possible Hou attack. When Hou arrived, he put Baling under siege, and Wang each time repelled Hou, who became impressed at his bravery. Eventually, Hou's food supplies ran out, and Ren was captured, forcing Hou to flee. Wang advanced to Jiangxia, putting it under siege. When Hou's general Song Zixian (宋子仙), whom Hou left in charge at Jiangxia, offered to surrender the city with the condition that Wang allowed him to retreat, Wang agreed and prepared ships for Song, but as soon as Song left the city, Wang attacked and captured him and Ding He (丁和), who were delivered to Jiangling and executed.

Wang continued to advance east, and in fall 551, he joined forces with Chen Baxian, who had advanced north from Guang Province (廣州, modern Guangdong). Wang and Chen, by Xiao Yi's orders, stopped at Xunyang (尋陽, in modern Jiujiang, Jiangxi) to wait for the rest of the troops. Xiao Yi also made Wang the governor of Jiang Province. When Wang heard the news that Hou had killed Xiao Gang, who had succeeded Emperor Wu after Emperor Wu's death in summer 549 (as Emperor Jianwen), he submitted a petition to Xiao Yi, asking Xiao Yi to take the throne, but Xiao Yi did not accept it. (In winter 551, Hou further deposed Emperor Wu's great-grandson Xiao Dong and declared himself the Emperor of Han.)

In spring 552, by Xiao Yi's orders, Wang and Chen continued east against Hou. Before they left Xunyang, they built an altar at which they swore allegiance to Liang. They quickly advanced on Jiankang, defeating Hou's general Hou Zijian (侯子鑒). When Hou Jing himself attacked them, they defeated him, and he fled. They entered Jiankang. Records indicate that Wang's forces were lacking in military discipline, and they pillaged the people of Jiankang, stripping them of wealth and clothes. Further, soldiers set the Taiji Palace (太極殿) ablaze—although Wang blamed this incident on Wang Lin, leading to Xiao Yi eventually putting Wang Lin under arrest. He sent the general Hou Tian to pursue Hou Jing, while burying Emperor Jianwen with proper ceremony. He requested again that Xiao Yi return to Jiankang to take the throne, but Xiao Yi again declined, effectively putting Wang in charge of the eastern empire, and Wang in turn put Chen in charge of the important city Jingkou (京口, in modern Zhenjiang, Jiangsu). Soon, Hou Jing, in flight, was killed by his own guards, and his body was delivered to Jiankang. Wang delivered Hou's head to Jiangling and delivered his hands to Eastern Wei's successor state Northern Qi. Xiao Yi created Wang the Duke of Changning. In light of Hou's defeat, Northern Qi seized nearly all of the formerly Liang territory north of the Yangtze River, and Wang and Chen had to fend themselves against Northern Qi attacks. Once they did, however, Wang, not wanting to aggravate Northern Qi, did not counterattack, and further, when the provincial gentry from those lost provinces requested that he attack because they did not want to be under Northern Qi rule, he rejected their requests, although when the people of Guangling (廣陵, in modern Yangzhou, Jiangsu) claimed to be ready to rise against Northern Qi, he permitted Chen to advance to Guangling, putting it under siege. Subsequently, Northern Qi agreed to return Guangling and Liyang (歷陽, in modern Chaohu, Anhui), and the campaign ended.

== During Emperor Yuan's reign ==
In winter 552, Xiao Yi declared himself emperor (as Emperor Yuan), but stayed in Jiangling rather than returning to Jiankang. He made Wang Sengbian the governor of Yang Province (揚州, modern southern Jiangsu and southern Anhui). Meanwhile, after Emperor Yuan put Wang Lin under arrest, Wang Lin's soldiers rebelled at Xiang Province, under the command of Wang Lin's lieutenant Lu Na (陸納), and Lu's forces were initially successful, capturing not only Xiang Province but other surrounding territories. Emperor Yuan summoned Wang Sengbian to rendezvous with his cousin Xiao Xun (蕭循) the Marquess of Yifeng to attack Lu. Wang and Xiao Xun were subsequently able to defeat Lu and put Changsha under siege, but were unable to capture it quickly. With Emperor Yuan's brother Xiao Ji the Prince of Wuling also having claimed imperial title and attacking him from the west, Emperor Yuan pardoned Wang Lin, and Lu surrendered to Wang Lin. (Subsequently, Emperor Yuan's forces, no longer divided on two fronts, defeated and killed Xiao Ji, who had earlier killed Wang Sengbian's brother Wang Senglüe when Wang Senglüe tried to persuade him not to claim imperial title.) Wang subsequently arrived at Jiangling to meet Emperor Yuan. In fall 553, Emperor Yuan returned him to his post at Jiankang and returned Chen Baxian, whom Wang had left in charge of Jiankang in his absence, back to Jingkou.

Later in fall 553, Emperor Wenxuan of Northern Qi prepared for an operation where he would try to impose Emperor Yuan's cousin Xiao Tui (蕭退) the Marquess of Xiangtan as Liang's emperor. Emperor Yuan ordered Wang to head to Gushu (姑孰, in modern Ma'anshan, Anhui) to defend against the attack. When Hou Tian subsequently defeated the Northern Qi general Guo Yuanjian (郭元建), Northern Qi forces withdrew, and Wang returned to Jiankang.

In fall 554, when Western Wei launched an attack on Jiangling, Emperor Yuan summoned Wang from Jiankang. Wang readied his troops to come to Jiangling's aid, but before Wang could do so, Jiangling fell. Western Wei forces took Emperor Yuan captive and, around new year 555, put him to death, creating Xiao Cha, who had become a Western Wei vassal, as emperor instead. Xiao Cha's state is known as the Western Liang in history.

== After Emperor Yuan's death ==
After hearing of Emperor Yuan's death, Wang Sengbian and Chen Baxian did not recognize Xiao Cha as emperor; instead, they welcomed Emperor Yuan's 12-year-old son Xiao Fangzhi the Prince of Jin'an, who was then the governor of Jiang Province, to Jiankang, and had him formally take imperial powers with the title Prince of Liang, although not yet with imperial title. Meanwhile, Northern Qi seized Ying Province, and Wang sent Hou Tian to attack Ying Province.

Northern Qi's Emperor Wenxuan again wanted to create a puppet Liang regime, and he created another cousin of Emperor Yuan, Xiao Yuanming the Marquess of Zhenyang, who had been an honored captive since 547 when he was captured after failing in his mission to aid Hou's rebellion against the then Eastern Wei emperor, and sent his brother Gao Huan (高渙) the Prince of Shangdang to escort Xiao Yuanming with an army. Wang initially resisted Northern Qi's overtures, but Gao Huan quickly defeated several generals. Wang began to waver in his position, and in summer 555, he agreed to have Xiao Yuanming become emperor. He sent his son Wang Xian (王顯), nephew Wang Shizhen (王世珍), and Wang Xian's mother Lady Liu (probably his concubine) to Northern Qi as hostages and, after extracting a promise from Xiao Yuanming that he would create Xiao Fangzhi crown prince, accepted Xiao Yuanming as emperor. Subsequently, Hou Tian was recalled from his attack on Ying Province, although Northern Qi returned Ying Province eventually anyway, as Northern Qi now saw Liang as a vassal.

Chen, however, was displeased with the situation, despite his deep friendship with Wang, as Wang repeatedly rejected his advice against welcoming Xiao Yuanming. Wang Sengbian's son Wang Yi (王顗) suspected of Chen's intentions and advised Wang Sengbian to watch out for potential attack from Chen, but Wang Sengbian, trusting Chen deeply, did not see Chen as a threat. Chen, indeed, was planning a coup. Meanwhile, news came that Northern Qi was preparing an attack, and Wang Sengbian sent his secretary Jiang Gan (江旰) to Jingkou to alert Chen. Chen, instead, detained Jiang while preparing his forces. He launched a surprise attack on Wang's headquarters at the fortress of Shitou. Wang was caught defenseless and was forced to surrender. Chen told Wang, "I am surprised that you did not prepare for an attack." Wang's response was, "I entrusted the northern gate to you. How can you say that I did not prepare?" That night, Chen strangled Wang Sengbian and his son Wang Wei (王頠) to death. He subsequently deposed Xiao Yuanming and took over the regency over Xiao Fangzhi, whom he declared emperor (as Emperor Jing), but subsequently seized the throne from Emperor Jing in 557, establishing the Chen dynasty.
