= Xiao Yuanming =

Emperor of the Liang Dynasty in 555

Emperor Min of Liang 梁閔帝

Emperor of the Liang Dynasty
- Reign: July 1 – October 29, 555
- Predecessor: Emperor Yuan
- Successor: Emperor Jing
- Western Liang Emperor(s): Emperor Xuan
- Born: unknown
- Died: June 2, 556
- Issue: Xiao Zhang; Xiao Yu; Xiao Dao; Xiao Dun
Full name
- Family name: Xiāo (蕭); Given name: Yuānmíng (淵明)
Era name and dates
- Tiānchéng (天成): July 1, 555 – November 1, 555
Posthumous name
- Emperor Mǐn (閔皇帝, lit. "the careful Emperor") (honored by Xiao Zhuang)
- Dynasty: Liang Dynasty
- Father: Xiao Yi

Xiao Yuanming (蕭淵明) (died 2 June 556), courtesy name Jingtong (靖通), often known by his pre-ascension title of Marquess of Zhenyang (貞陽侯), at times known by his post-removal title Duke of Jian'an (建安公), honored Emperor Min (閔皇帝) by Xiao Zhuang, was briefly an emperor of the Chinese Liang dynasty. He was the nephew of the founding emperor Emperor Wu. In 555, with Liang in disarray after Western Wei had captured and killed Emperor Yuan, Northern Qi, which had held Xiao Yuanming as an honored captive since 547, forced the general Wang Sengbian to accept Xiao Yuanming as emperor. Soon, however, Wang's subordinate Chen Baxian killed Wang and removed Xiao Yuanming from the throne, replacing him with Emperor Yuan's son Xiao Fangzhi (Emperor Jing). Xiao Yuanming died the following year.

== Early life ==
It is not known when Xiao Yuanming was born. His father Xiao Yi (蕭懿) was a major general during late Southern Qi, and of Xiao Yi's sons, five (perhaps all) are known to history. Xiao Yuanming was the youngest among these sons. As Xiao Yi was forced to commit suicide by Southern Qi's cruel emperor Xiao Baojuan in November 500, Xiao Yuanming could not have been born any later than 501.

After Xiao Yi's death, Xiao Yi's younger brother and Xiao Yuanming's uncle Xiao Yan rebelled at his post of Xiangyang, seeking to avenge Xiao Yi. By 502 he put the capital Jiankang under siege, and Xiao Baojuan was killed by his own generals. Later that year, Xiao Yan seized the throne from Xiao Baojuan's younger brother Emperor He of Southern Qi, ending Southern Qi and establishing Liang Dynasty (as Emperor Wu). Emperor Wu was said to love Xiao Yuanming greatly, and he created Xiao Yuanming the Marquess of Zhenyang.

== Career as Liang official ==
Nothing is known about Xiao Yuanming's career as an official until 547, when it was recorded that he was the governor of Yu Province (豫州, modern central Anhui). The people were said to be so impressed by his governance that they made a stone monument commemorating his term of office. However, it became known later that the artisans who carved the monument were associated with and paid by Xiao Yuanming. Therefore, it became widely believed that he had encouraged the people to create the monument to praise himself.

In 547, the Eastern Wei general Hou Jing, in conflict with the regent Gao Cheng, surrendered his domain—13 provinces between the Yellow River and the Huai River—to Liang. Emperor Wu accepted Hou's surrender and commissioned an army to aid Hou, to be commanded by Emperor Wu's grandson Xiao Huili (蕭會理) the Prince of Nankang. Xiao Yuanming requested to accompany Xiao Huili, and was made Xiao Huili's assistant. However, Xiao Huili was cowardly and arrogant, and he refused to meet his subordinate generals, even Xiao Yuanming. Xiao Yuanming secretly informed Emperor Wu of this, and Emperor Wu relieved Xiao Huili of his command and put Xiao Yuanming in command.

The Liang army, commanded by Xiao Yuanming, advanced on the Eastern Wei city Pengcheng (彭城, in modern Xuzhou, Jiangsu), and Xiao Yuanming camped at Hanshan (寒山), in Pengcheng's vicinity, and built a dam over Si River (泗水) to use water to attack Pengcheng. Xiao Yuanming's lieutenant, the general Yang Kan, quickly completed the dam, but when Yang advised Xiao Yuanming to attack Pengcheng, Xiao Yuanming hesitated. Because Xiao Yuanming could not come up with a coordinated strategy, the generals under him began to carry out their own actions, including pillaging the people in the region, and Xiao Yuanming was unable to stop them, save the units directly under his own command.

Late in 547, the Eastern Wei forces commanded by Murong Shaozong arrived, and instead of engaging the Eastern Wei forces quickly as Yang suggested, Xiao Yuanming became drunk with wine and allowed Murong's army to settle in. When the armies did engage, the Liang forces were initially successful, but Murong's counterattack caused Liang forces to collapse, and Xiao Yuanming was captured. However, the people of the region was impressed by his refusal to pillage them, and gave him the epithet "the righteous prince" (義王, yi wang). He was taken to the Eastern Wei capital Yecheng (鄴城, in modern Handan, Hebei), where Emperor Xiaojing of Eastern Wei formally received and rebuked him, and then released him, sending him to Gao Cheng's headquarters at Jinyang (晉陽, in modern Taiyuan, Shanxi), where Gao treated him with honor—intending to use Xiao Yuanming as a pawn in negotiations with Liang. Subsequently, Gao allowed Xiao Yuanming to write to Emperor Wu and offered to return Xiao Yuanming—causing Hou, who had by that point lost the 13 provinces but controlled Yu Province, to rebel in 548, capturing Jiankang in 549, taking Emperor Wu and his crown prince Xiao Gang hostages, and throwing Liang into a general state of confusion and unrest.

== Return to Liang ==
Little is known about Xiao Yuanming's activities while in Eastern Wei and its successor state Northern Qi (as Gao Cheng's successor and brother Gao Yang seized the throne from Emperor Xiaojing in 550 and established Northern Qi as its Emperor Wenxuan), although it was said that Xiao Yuanming cried bitterly when he heard about the fall of Jiankang. He was given the office of sanqi changshi (散騎常侍) -- an honorific office with little responsibilities.

In 552, Emperor Wu's son Xiao Yi the Prince of Xiangdong defeated Hou and declared himself emperor (as Emperor Yuan), setting his capital at Jiangling (江陵, in modern Jingzhou, Hubei) rather than the war-devastated Jiankang, but in 554, Western Wei forces captured Jiangling, capturing and then executing Emperor Yuan. In light of Emperor Yuan's death, his most important general Wang Sengbian and Wang's lieutenant Chen Baxian, who together controlled the eastern empire, welcomed Emperor Yuan's 12-year-old son Xiao Fangzhi to Jiankang, preparing to make him emperor, and in spring 555, Xiao Fangzhi took the title Prince of Liang.

At that time, however, Emperor Wenxuan, who had previously made an unsuccessful attempt to establish Xiao Yuanming's cousin Xiao Tui (蕭退) as Liang's emperor in 553, decided to again try to establish a vassal regime in Liang. He wrote Wang, suggesting that Xiao Fangzhi was too young to be emperor and proposing Xiao Yuanming as emperor—and Xiao Yuanming apparently cooperated with Emperor Wenxuan in this attempt, as he wrote a letter to Wang as well. Wang initially wrote back to reject the offer. However, a few quick victories by Northern Qi escort forces, commanded by Emperor Wenxuan's brother Gao Huan (高渙) the Prince of Shangdang, made Wang fearful, and he wrote back, agreeing to support Xiao Yuanming as emperor—but extracting a promise from Xiao Yuanming to create Xiao Fangzhi crown prince. Wang also allowedly only 1,000 soldiers to accompany Xiao Yuanming south of the Yangtze River. In summer 555, Xiao Yuanming arrived at Jiankang, and as he saw the main gate to the palace—Zhuque Gate (朱雀門), he cried bitterly, and the Liang officials also cried bitterly. He then took the throne. Pursuant to his promise, he created Xiao Fangzhi crown prince. Wang and Chen continued to be in command of the armed forces.

== Reign ==
Xiao Yuanming's reign did not last long. In fall 555, Chen Baxian, displeased with Xiao Yuanming's ascension—which he had tried to persuade Wang Sengbian not to accept—made a surprise attack on Jiankang from his post at Jingkou (京口, in modern Zhenjiang, Jiangsu). With everyone believing that Chen's army movement was in response to report that Northern Qi was planning to attack, Jiankang's defense forces made no effort to resist, and Chen surprised Wang, killing him and seizing power. Two days after Wang's death, Xiao Yuanming abdicated and moved out of the palace, returning to his private residence. Chen made Xiao Fangzhi emperor (as Emperor Jing).

== After abdication ==
Emperor Jing formally made Xiao Yuanming prime minister and created him the greater title of Duke of Jian'an, although there is no evidence that Xiao Yuanming yielded much actual power.

In light of the coup, Northern Qi launched a major attack on Liang in winter 555, aided by Liang generals loyal to Wang Sengbian. The Northern Qi and Liang armies following Chen Baxian's orders stalemated for months. In summer 556, Northern Qi generals invited Xiao Yuanming to their camp for peace negotiations, and Chen sent Xiao Yuanming to the Northern Qi camp. However, before any negotiations could commence, Xiao Yuanming died from a severe infection on his back. In 558, Xiao Zhuang the Prince of Yongjia (Emperor Yuan's grandson), who was proclaimed Liang's emperor by the general Wang Lin following Chen's seizure of the throne from Emperor Jing earlier that year, honored Xiao Yuanming as Emperor Min—a posthumous name recognized by but rarely used by traditional historians.

== Issue ==
- Xiao Zhang (蕭章)
- Xiao Yu (蕭遇)
- Xiao Dao (蕭道)
- Xiao Dun, Prince of Gaotang (高唐王 蕭盾)

Regnal titles
Preceded by Emperor Yuan of Liang	Emperor of Liang Dynasty (Eastern/Southern); 555	Succeeded by Emperor Jing of Liang
