= Timeline of the Northern and Southern dynasties =

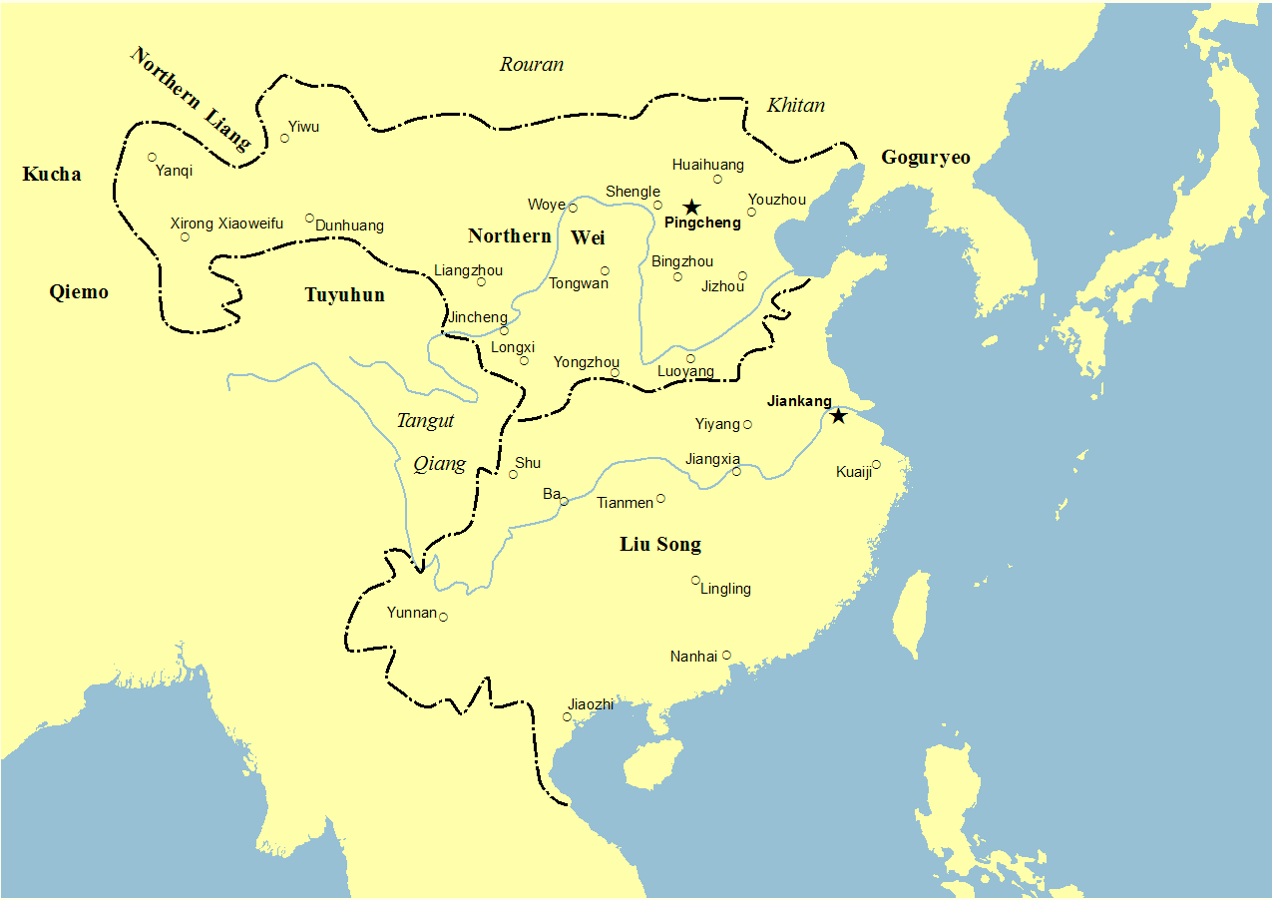
China in 460 AD

This is a timeline of the Northern and Southern dynasties in China.

== 380s ==
Year	Date	Event
386		Northern Wei: Tuoba Gui revives the Tuoba state
386		Later Qin: Yao Chang declares himself emperor
387		Later Liang: Lü Guang declares himself Duke of Jiuquan

== 390s ==
Year	Date	Event
393		Wei: Conquered by Later Yan
394		Later Qin: Conquers Former Qin
394		Later Yan: Conquers Western Yan
395		Northern Wei: Tuoba Gui defeats Later Yan at Canhepi (east-northeast of Liangcheng, Inner Mongolia)
396		Northern Wei: Tuoba Gui takes Bingzhou from Later Yan
396		Emperor Xiaowu of Jin dies and is succeeded by Sima Dezong (Emperor An of Jin)
397		Southern Liang: Tufa Wugu declares himself Prince of Xiping
397		Northern Liang: Duan Ye declares himself Duke of Jiankang in Zhangye
398		Northern Wei: Tuoba Gui moves his capital to Pingcheng
399		Northern Wei: Tuoba Gui declares himself emperor
399		Sun En revolts
399		Faxian leaves for India

== 400s ==
Year	Date	Event
400		Western Liang (Sixteen Kingdoms): Li Gao declares himself Duke of Liang in Dunhuang
400		Western Qin: Submits to Southern Liang and then Later Qin
400		Southern Yan: Murong De declares himself emperor in Guanggu
401		Northern Liang: Juqu Mengxun kills Duan Ye and declares himself Duke of Zhangye
402		Huan Xuan sacks Jiankang and Sun En dies, but his lieutenant Lu Xun takes over
403		Later Liang: Surrenders to Later Qin
404		Huan Xuan declares himself emperor and dies the same year
405		Qiao Zong declares himself Prince of Chengdu
407		Xia: Helian Bobo declares himself Heavenly King
407		Northern Yan: Gao Yun is set up as heavenly king and replaces Later Yan
409		Western Qin: Revived

== 410s ==
Year	Date	Event
410		Liu Yu conquers Southern Yan
411		Rebel Lu Xun dies
412		Faxian returns from India
413		Jin recovers Sichuan and Qiao Zong commits suicide
414		Western Qin: Conquers Southern Liang
416		Jin takes Luoyang from Later Qin
416		Huiyuan dies
417		Jin conquers Later Qin and Liu Yu takes Chang'an
418		Jin troops retreat from Chang'an
418		Xia (Sixteen Kingdoms): Helian Bobo takes Chang'an
419		Xia (Sixteen Kingdoms): Helian Bobo leaves Chang'an

== 420s ==
Year	Date	Event
420		Liu Yu (Emperor Wu of Liu Song) replaces the Jin dynasty with the Song dynasty
421		Northern Liang: Juqu Mengxun conquers Western Liang (Sixteen Kingdoms)
422		Emperor Wu of Liu Song dies and is succeeded by Liu Yifu, Emperor Shao of Liu Song
423		Kou Qianzhi sets up the Celestial Master at Pingcheng
424		Emperor Shao of Liu Song is deposed and succeeded by Liu Yilong (Emperor Wen of Liu Song)
426		Northern Wei: Attacks Xia
427		Northern Wei: Takes Chang'an and sacks the Xia capital, Tongwan
428		Xia: Retakes Chang'an

== 430s ==
Year	Date	Event
430		Northern Wei: Takes Luoyang from Liu Song
430		Western Qin: Abandons Yuanchuan and Fuhan to the Tuyuhun and relocates to Pingliang and Anding
431		Xia: Conquers Western Qin and are in turn conquered by the Tuyuhun
433		Xie Lingyun is killed
434		Northern Wei: Enters a marriage alliance with the Rouran
434		Song retakes Hanzhong from Chouchi
435		Northern Wei: Attacks Northern Yan
436		Northern Wei: Conquers Northern Yan, whose sovereign Feng Hong flees to Goguryeo
439		Northern Wei: Conquers Northern Liang; so ends the Sixteen Kingdoms

== 440s ==
Year	Date	Event
442		Northern Wei: Tuoba Tao takes part in a Daoist ritual to receive talisman registers
445		Northern Wei: Ge Wu rebels in Guanzhong
446		Northern Wei: Ge Wu dies
446		Northern Wei: Cui Hao instigates proscription campaigns against Buddhism
449		Northern Wei: Defeats the Rouran in battle

== 450s ==
Year	Date	Event
450		Northern Wei: Cui Hao is killed
450		Liu Song launches a campaign against Northern Wei
451		Northern Wei: Tuoba Tao leads his army south to Guabu (southeast of Luhe, Jiangsu)
451		Pei Songzhi dies
453		Emperor Wen of Liu Song is killed by Liu Shao, who is killed Liu Jun (Emperor Xiaowu of Liu Song)
453		Northern Wei: Construction of the Yungang Caves begin
458		Liu Song launches a campaign against Buddhism

== 460s ==
Year	Date	Event
464		Emperor Xiaowu of Liu Song dies and is succeeded by Liu Ziye (Emperor Qianfei of Liu Song)
465		Northern Wei: Emperor Wencheng of Northern Wei dies and is succeeded by Tuaba Hong (Emperor Xianwen of Northern Wei)
465		Emperor Qianfei of Liu Song dies
466		Liu Yu (Emperor Ming of Liu Song) takes power
466		Bao Zhao is killed
467		Northern Wei: Conquers territory north and west of the Huai River
469		Northern Wei: Takes Qingzhou and Jizhou (冀州) (north Jiangsu)

== 470s ==
Year	Date	Event
471		Northern Wei: Emperor Xianwen of Northern Wei abdicates in favor of Yuan Hong (Emperor Xiaowen of Northern Wei)
472		Emperor Ming of Liu Song dies and is succeeded by Liu Yu (Emperor Houfei of Liu Song)
477		Emperor Houfei of Liu Song is killed by Xiao Daocheng and is succeeded by Liu Zhun (Emperor Shun of Liu Song)
479		Xiao Daocheng (Emperor Gao of Southern Qi) replaces Liu Song with the Southern Qi

== 480s ==
Year	Date	Event
482		Emperor Gao of Southern Qi dies and is succeeded by Xiao Ze (Emperor Wu of Southern Qi)
485		Northern Wei: The equal-field system is implemented
486		Northern Wei: The Three Chiefs system is implemented

== 490s ==
Year	Date	Event
493		Emperor Wu of Southern Qi dies and is succeeded by Xiao Zhaoye
493		Northern Wei: Li Chong starts constructions in Luoyang
494		Northern Wei: Emperor Xiaowen of Northern Wei moves to Luoyang
494		Northern Wei: Construction on the Longmen Caves begin
495		Northern Wei: Emperor Xiaowen of Northern Wei bans Xianbei language in court
498		Emperor Ming of Southern Qi dies and is succeeded by Xiao Baojuan
499		Northern Wei: Emperor Xiaowen of Northern Wei dies and is succeeded by Yuan Ke (Emperor Xuanwu of Northern Wei)

== 500s ==
Year	Date	Event
500		Northern Wei: Conquers territory south of the Huai River
501		Emperor He of Southern Qi is enthroned in Jiangling as a rival to Xiao Baojuan
502		Xiao Baojuan is killed in Jiankang and Xiao Yan kills Emperor He of Southern Qi, founding his own Liang dynasty
504		Northern Wei: Conquers Yiyang
506		Northern Wei: Annexes Chouchi
507		Northern Wei: Is defeated by Liang dynasty at Zhongli (northeast of Fengyang, Anhui)

== 510s ==
Year	Date	Event
512		Northern Wei: Loses Qushan (southwest of Lianyungang, Jiangsu) to Liang dynasty
518		Northern Wei: Song Yun departs for the Western Regions

== 520s ==
Year	Date	Event
520		Northern Wei: Yujiulü Anagui takes shelter
522		Northern Wei: Song Yun returns from India with 170 Buddhist sutras
523		Northern Wei: The Six Frontier Towns rebel under Poliuhan Baling
525		Northern Wei: Yujiulü Anagui defeats Poliuhan Baling
525		Northern Wei: Du Luozhou rebels in north Hebei
526		Northern Wei: Ge Rong rebels in north Hebei
527		Northern Wei: Xiao Baoyin rebels in Guanzhong and kills Li Daoyuan
528		Northern Wei: Erzhu Rong kills Yuan Zhao and enthrones Yuan Ziyou (Emperor Xiaozhuang of Northern Wei)
528		Northern Wei: Ge Rong is defeated
529		Emperor Wu of Liang enters the Tongtai Monastery

== 530s ==
Year	Date	Event
530		Northern Wei: Emperor Xiaozhuang of Northern Wei kills Erzhu Rong but is killed by Erzhu Zhao
532		Northern Wei: Gao Huan enthrones Yuan Xiu (Emperor Xiaowu of Northern Wei)
533		Northern Wei: Erzhu Zhao kills himself
534		Northern Wei: Emperor Xiaowu of Northern Wei escapes to Chang'an
534		Eastern Wei: Gao Huan sets up Yuan Shanjian as Emperor Xiaojing of Eastern Wei
535		Western Wei: Yuwen Tai kills Emperor Xiaowu of Northern Wei and enthrones Yuan Baoju (Emperor Wen of Western Wei)
536		Tao Hongjing dies
536		Eastern Wei: Chan Buddhism founder Bodhidharma dies
537		Battle of Shayuan: Yuwen Tai defeats Gao Huan

== 540s ==
Year	Date	Event
541		Lý Bôn rebels and attacks Liang officials
543		Eastern Wei: Gao Huan defeats Yuwen Tai at Luoyang
544		Lý Bôn establishes the Early Lý dynasty and becomes Lý Nam Đế (Southern Emperor)
545		Chen Baxian drives Lý Nam Đế into the mountains, where he is eventually killed, but resistance continues under Lý Thiên Bảo
547		Eastern Wei: Gao Huan dies and Hou Jing defects to Liang dynasty
548		Hou Jing rebels in Shouyang and lays siege to Jiankang
549		Hou Jing seizes Taicheng
549		Emperor Wu of Liang dies and is succeeded by Xiao Gang (Emperor Jianwen of Liang)
549		Xiao Cha defects to Western Wei
549		Eastern Wei: Conquers area south of the Huai River

== 550s ==
Year	Date	Event
550		Western Wei: Conquers area east of the Han River (Hubei)
550		Northern Qi: Gao Yang (Emperor Wenxuan of Northern Qi) replaces Eastern Wei with Northern Qi and conquers areas east of Luoyang
550		The fubing system is introduced
551		Hou Jing kills Emperor Jianwen of Liang and declares himself emperor
552		Wang Sengbian and Chen Baxian take Jiankang
552		Hou Jing is killed
552		Xiao Ji declares himself emperor in Jiangling
553		Xiao Ji is killed by Emperor Yuan of Liang's generals
553		Western Wei: Conquers Sichuan
553		Northern Qi: Rouran submit after behind being defeated by Turks
554		Emperor Yuan of Liang is captured by Western Wei and killed
555		Western Liang: Xiao Cha declares himself emperor in Jiangling
555		Wang Sengbian sets up Xiao Yuanming but Chen Baxian kills Sengbian and sets up Xiao Fangzhi (Emperor Jing of Liang)
556		Northern Qi: Attack on Jiankang fails
556		Western Wei: Yuwen Tai dies
557		Northern Zhou: Yuwen Hu replaces Western Wei with Northern Zhou
557		Chen Baxian replaces the Liang dynasty with the Chen dynasty
558		Western Liang: Takes Changsha and Wuling
559		Chen Baxian dies and is succeeded by Chen Qian (Emperor Wen of Chen)

== 560s ==
Year	Date	Event
560		Northern Zhou: Yuwen Hu kills Emperor Ming of Northern Zhou and sets up Yuwen Yong (Emperor Wu of Northern Zhou)
560		Northern Qi: Gao Yan (Emperor Xiaozhao of Northern Qi) ousts Emperor Fei of Northern Qi and sets himself up as emperor
561		Northern Zhou: North Hubei is lost to the Chen dynasty
561		Northern Qi: Emperor Xiaozhao of Northern Qi dies and is succeeded by Gao Zhan (Emperor Wucheng of Northern Qi)
565		Northern Qi: An attack by Northern Zhou is repulsed
565		Northern Qi: Emperor Wucheng of Northern Qi abdicates to Gao Wei
566		Emperor Wen of Chen dies and is succeeded by Chen Bozong (Emperor Fei of Chen)
568		Emperor Fei of Chen is deposed
569		Chen Xu (Emperor Xuan of Chen) takes power

== 570s ==
Year	Date	Event
570		Chen dynasty establishes trade relations with the Early Lý dynasty
572		Northern Zhou: Emperor Wu of Northern Zhou kills Yuwen Hu
573		Northern Qi: Loses areas north of the Changjiang to the Chen dynasty, including the Huai River valley
574		Northern Zhou: Emperor Wu of Northern Zhou launches proscription against Buddhism
575		Northern Qi: Forces are defeated by Chen dynasty at Lüliang
575		Northern Zhou: Attacks Northern Qi
576		Northern Zhou: Takes Jinyang
577		Northern Zhou: Annexes Northern Qi
578		Northern Zhou: Repulses a Chen attack on Pengcheng and captures Wu Mingche
578		Northern Zhou: Emperor Wu of Northern Zhou dies and is succeeded by Yuwen Yun (Emperor Xuan of Northern Zhou)
579		Northern Zhou: Emperor Xuan of Northern Zhou abdicates to Yuwen Chan (Emperor Jing of Northern Zhou)

== 580s ==
Year	Date	Event
580		Northern Zhou: Seizes area north of the Changjiang
580		Northern Zhou: Yang Jian becomes de facto holder of power
580		Northern Zhou: Yuchi Jiong and Wang Qian rebel but fail
581		Sui dynasty: Yang Jian (Emperor Wen of Sui) replaces the Northern Zhou with the Sui dynasty
582		Emperor Xuan of Chen dies and is succeeded by Chen Shubao
583		Sui dynasty: Emperor Wen of Sui moves into Daxingcheng (Xi'an, Shaanxi) and abolishes the commanderies while promulgating the Kaihuang Code
584		Sui dynasty: Digs the Guangtong Canal
587		Sui dynasty: Annexes Western Liang
588		Sui dynasty: Launches expedition against the Chen dynasty
589		Sui dynasty: Takes Jiankang and annexes the Chen dynasty; so ends the Northern and Southern dynasties

== Gallery ==
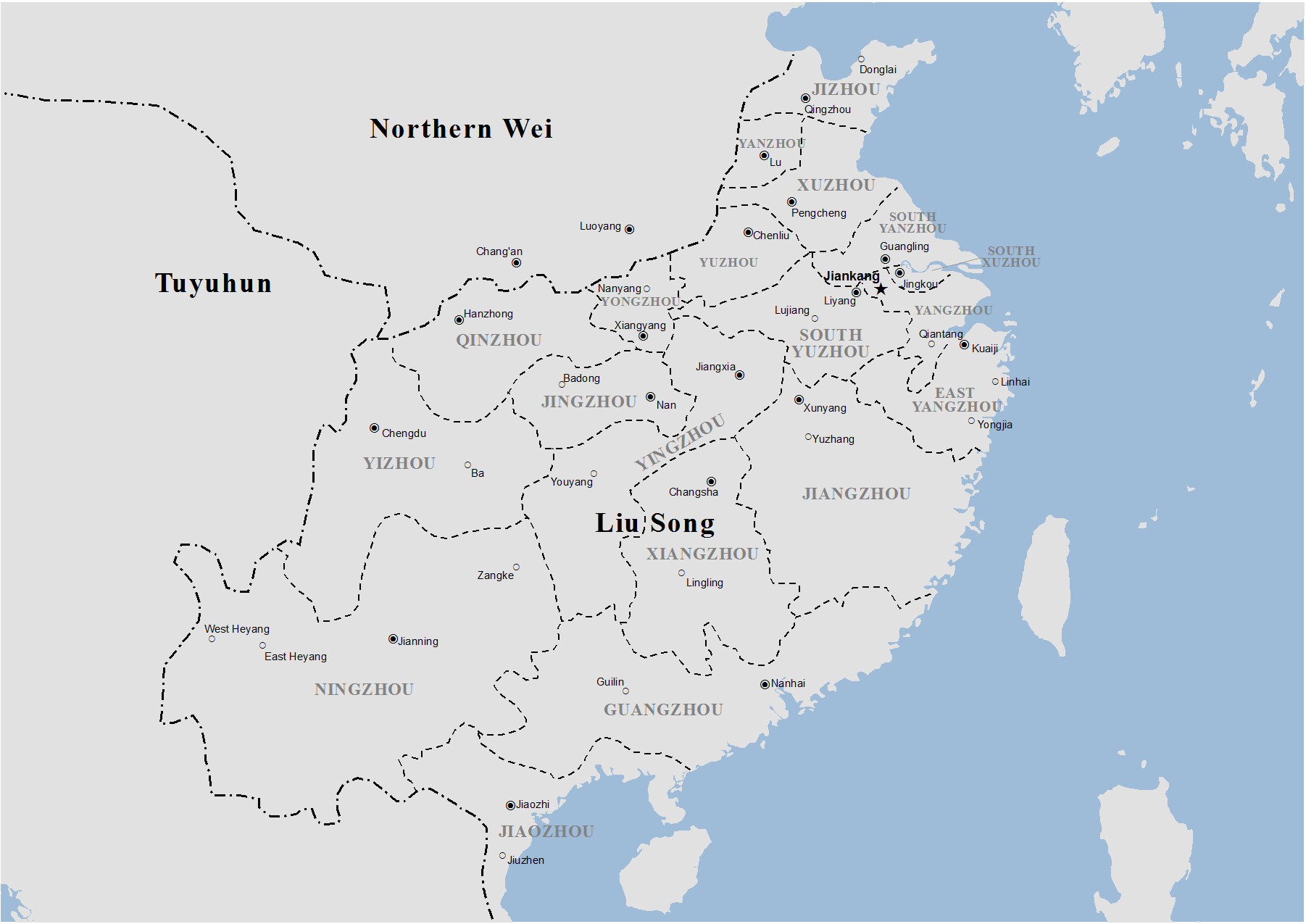
Liu Song

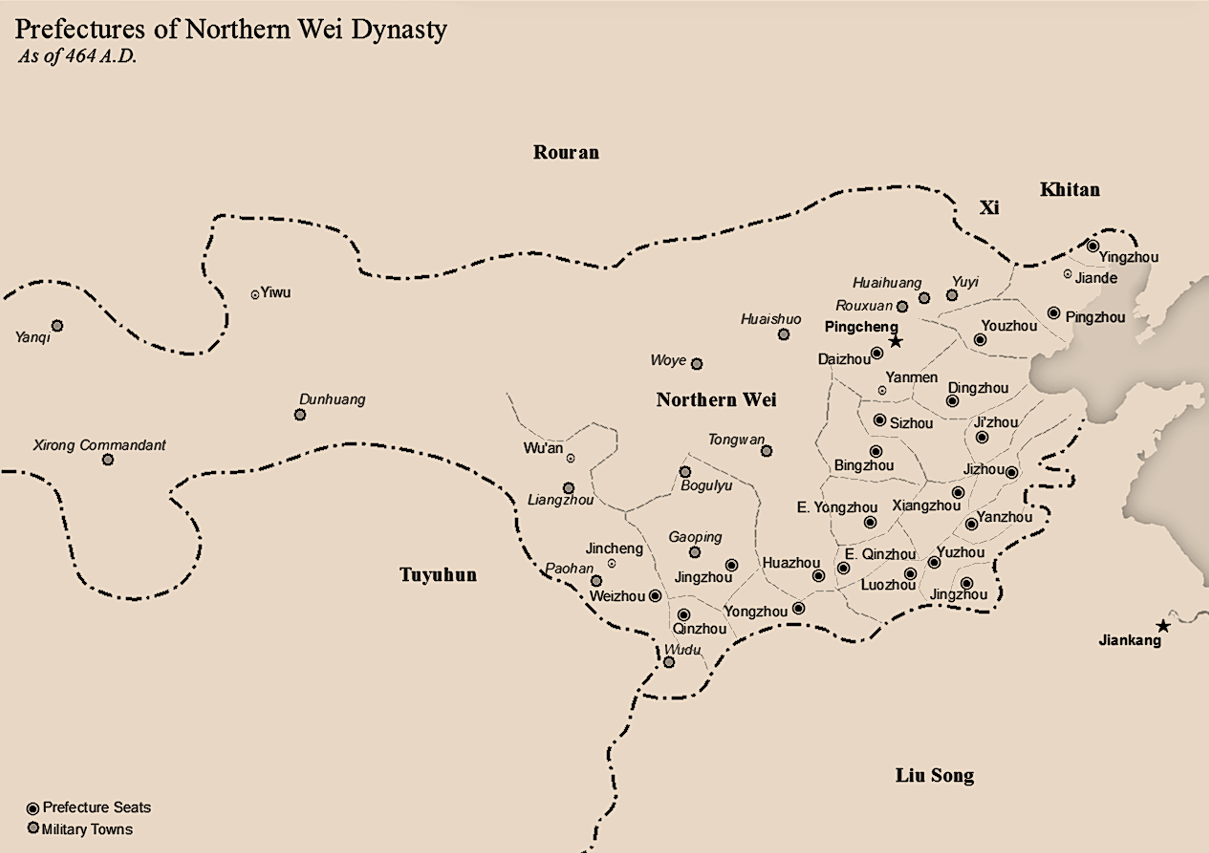
Northern Wei in 464 AD

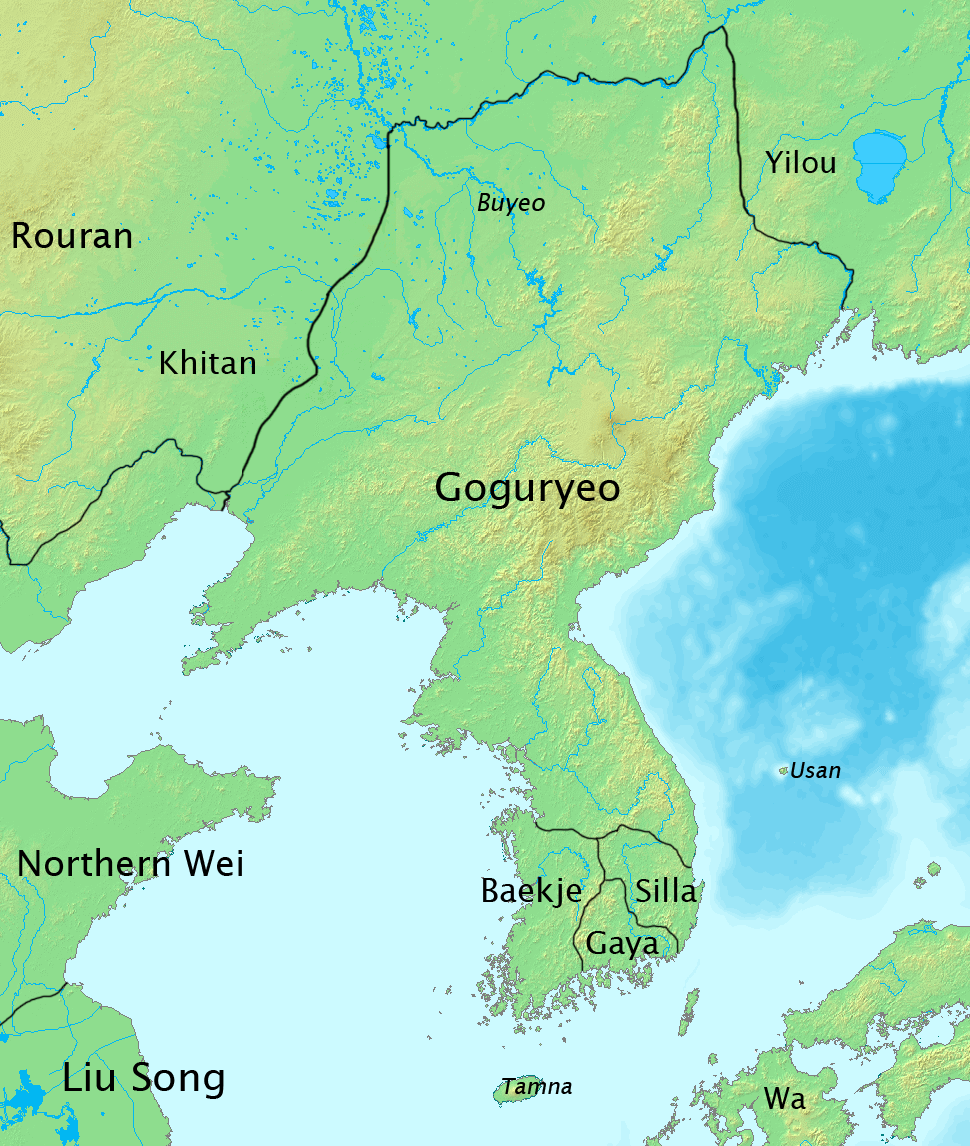
Korea in 476 AD

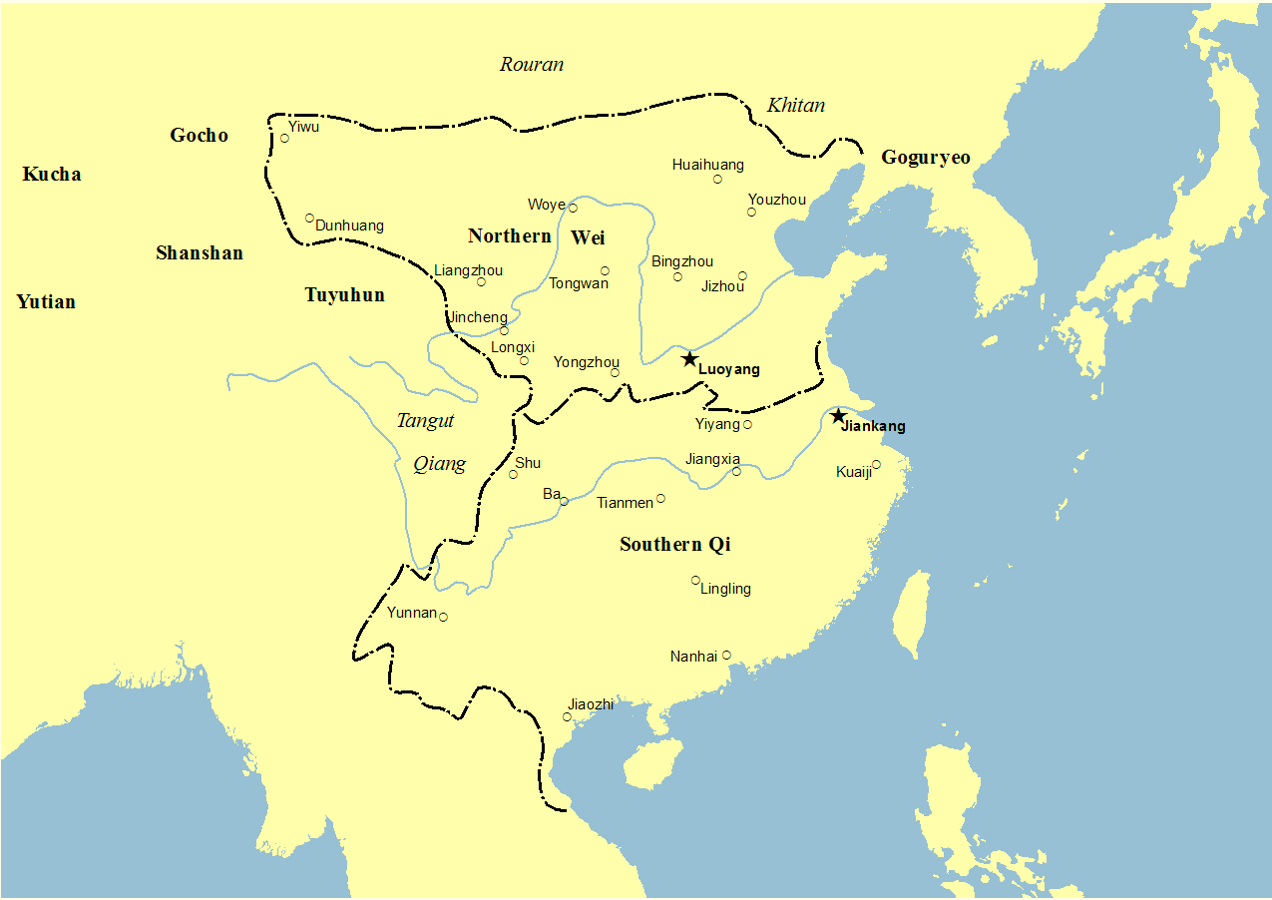
497 AD

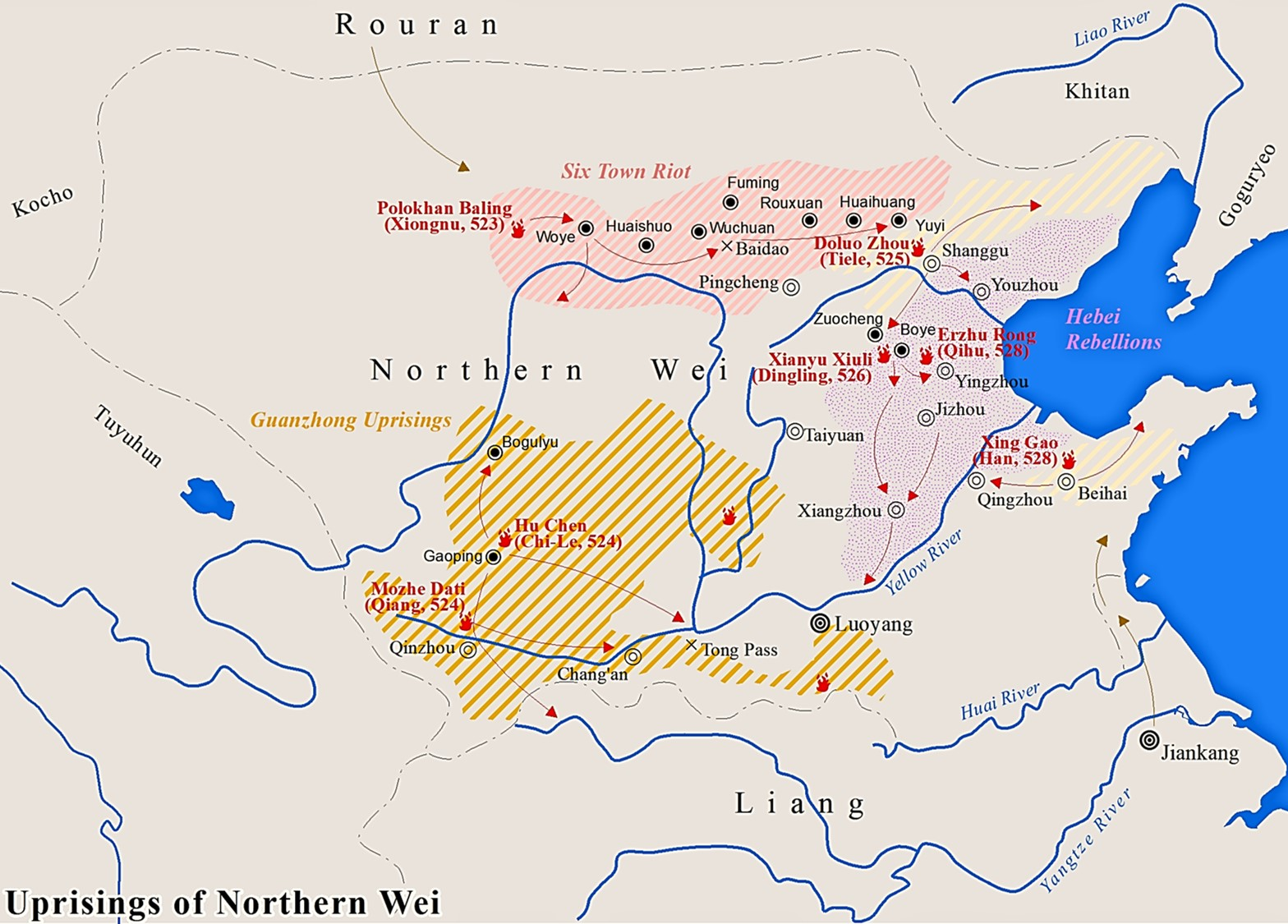
Uprisings of Northern Wei (523–528)

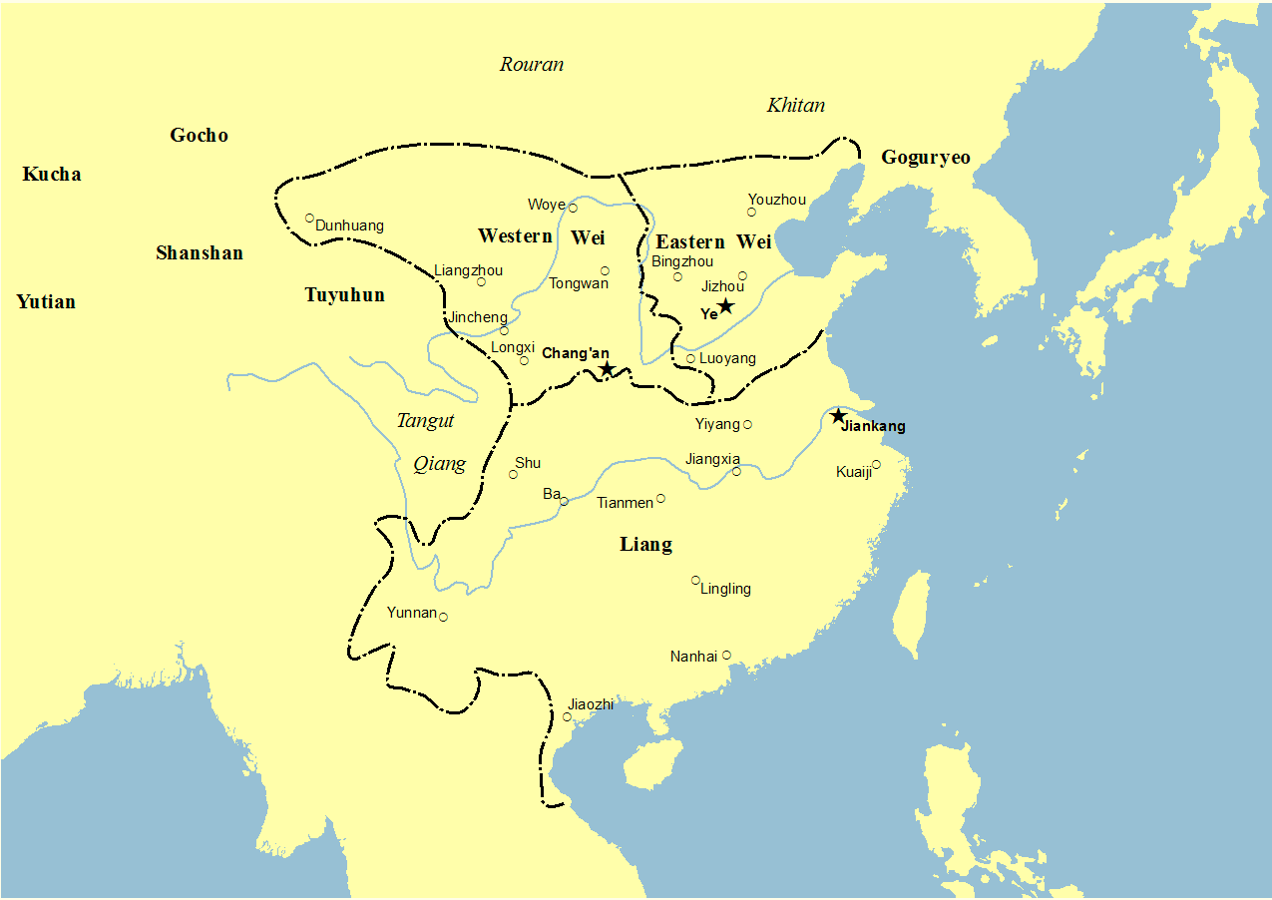
541 AD

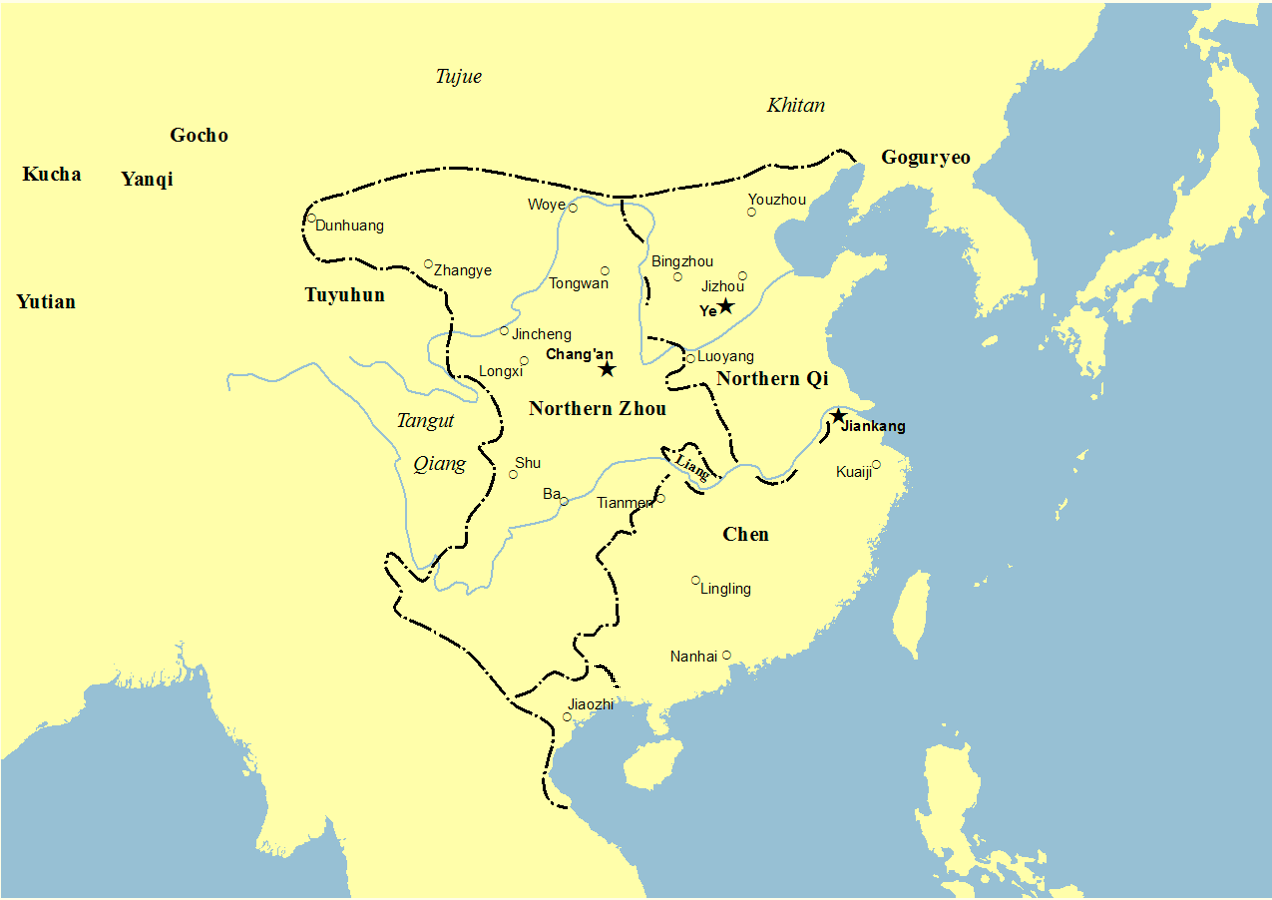
562 AD

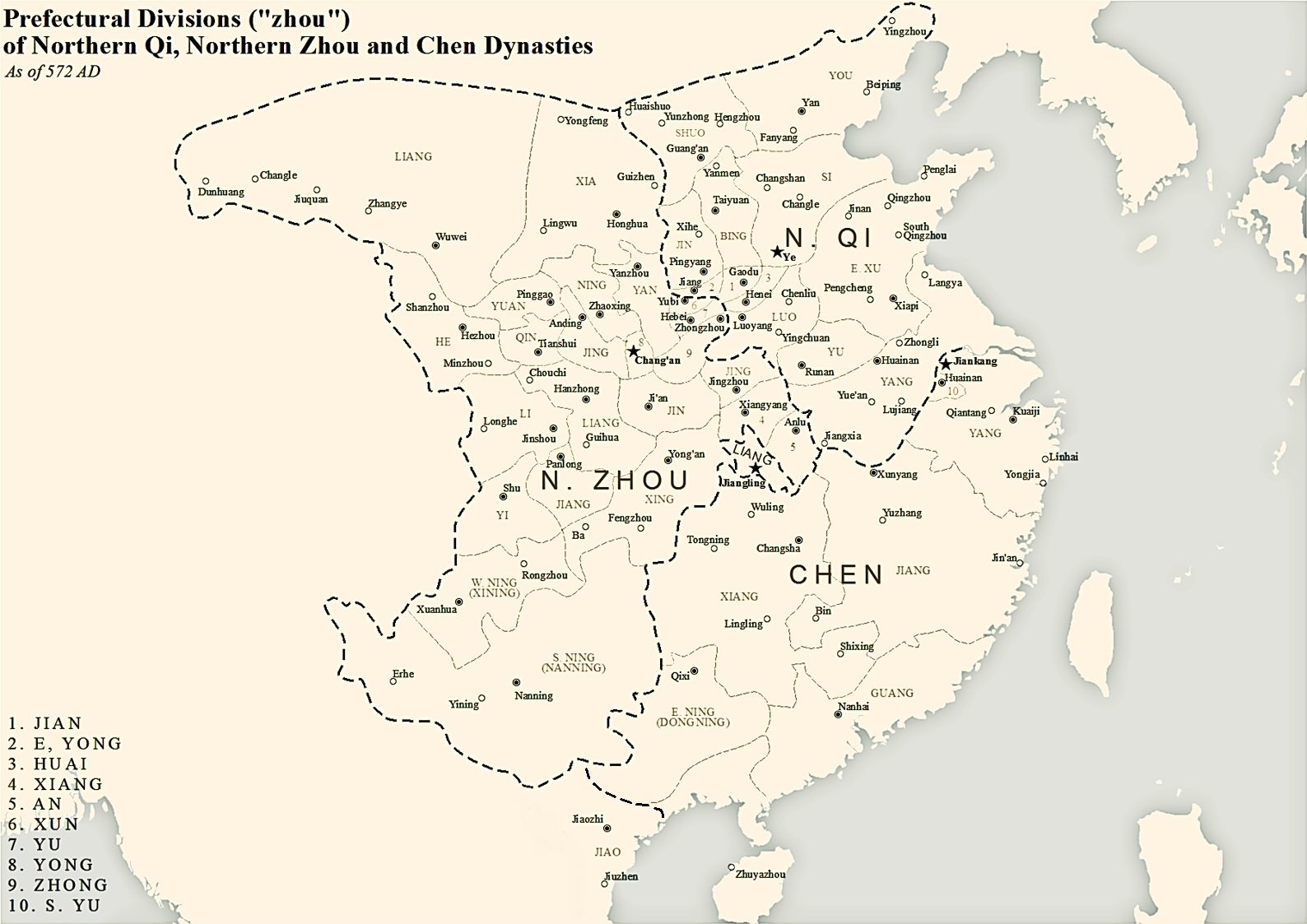
572 AD

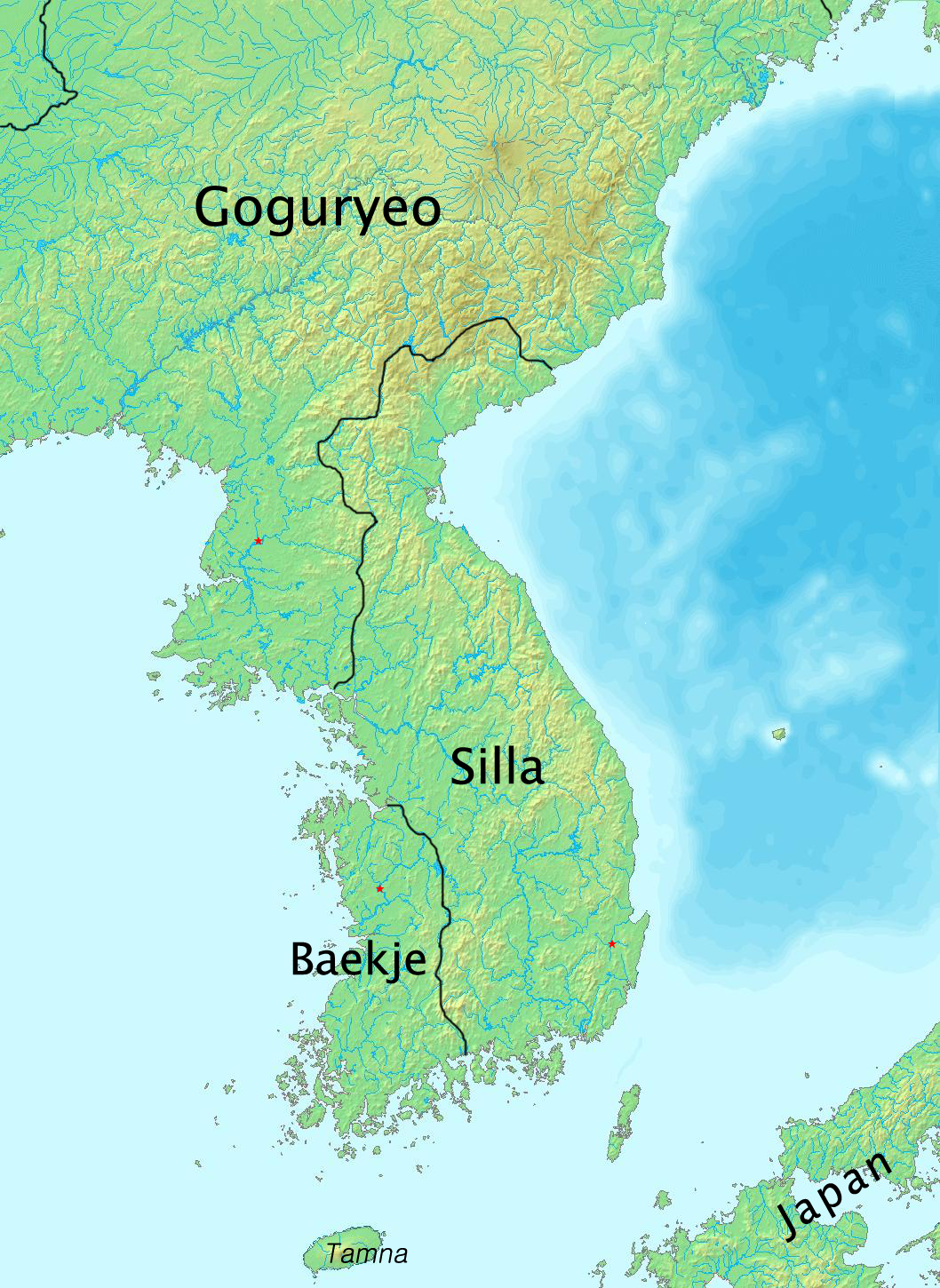
Korea in 576 AD

== Bibliography ==
- Crespigny, Rafe (2007), A Biographical Dictionary of Later Han to the Three Kingdoms (23-220 AD), Brill
- Taylor, K.W. (2013), A History of the Vietnamese, Cambridge University Press
- Xiong, Victor Cunrui (2009), Historical Dictionary of Medieval China, United States of America: Scarecrow Press, Inc., ISBN 978-0810860537
