= Phước Sơn =

- Commune
- Interactive map of Phước Sơn
- Coordinates: 11°44′13″N 107°14′24″E
- Country: Vietnam
- City: Đồng Nai
- Region: Southeast
- Established: 2002

Area
  - Total: 659.163 km^{2} (254.504 sq mi)

Population (2025)
  - Total: 31,570
  - Density: 80/km^{2} (210/sq mi)
- Website: phuocson.dongnai.gov.vn

Phước Sơn is a commune in Đồng Nai, Vietnam.

== Geography ==
Phước Sơn commune is a mountainous commune located in the northeastern part of Đồng Nai City, approximately 130 km north of Trấn Biên ward and 50 km east of Bình Phước ward. It is situated in the former Bù Đăng district of Bình Phước province. The commune borders the following areas:

- To the north, it borders Bù Đăng and Thọ Sơn communes in Đồng Nai city, and Quảng Tín commune in Lâm Đồng province.
- To the east, it borders Bảo Lâm 5 commune in Lâm Đồng province.
- To the south, it borders Đak Lua and Phú Lý communes in Đồng Nai city, as well as Đạ Tẻh 3, Đạ Tẻh, Cát Tiên 3, and Cát Tiên 2 communes in Lâm Đồng province.
- To the west, it borders Đồng Tâm and Nghĩa Trung communes.

== History ==
On 12 June 2025, the National Assembly of Vietnam adopted Resolution No. 202/2025/QH15 on the reorganization of provincial-level administrative units, which took effect on the same day. Under the resolution, Bình Phước province was merged into Đồng Nai province.

On 16 June 2025, the Standing Committee of the National Assembly of Vietnam adopted Resolution No. 1662/NQ-UBTVQH15 on the reorganization of commune-level administrative units in Đồng Nai province. Under the resolution, the entire area and population of Phước Sơn, Thống Nhất and Đăng Hà communes, formerly in Bù Đăng district, Bình Phước province, were consolidated to form a new commune named Phước Sơn. Following the merger, Phước Sơn commune has an area of 386.60 km² and a population of 31,005 as of 2024.

On 24 April 2026, the National Assembly adopted Resolution No. 30/2026/QH16 on the establishment of Đồng Nai city as a centrally governed city, comprising the entire natural area and population of Đồng Nai province. The resolution took effect on 30 April 2026. Phước Sơn commune has since been part of Đồng Nai city.

On 16 July 2026, the Government issued Resolution No. 188/NQ-CP on the transfer of Cát Tiên National Park to the management of the People's Committee of Đồng Nai City, including areas within the administrative boundaries of Lâm Đồng province, to ensure unified management and conservation. The resolution took effect on 27 October 2026. Under the resolution, 272.603 km² of the park's area in Lâm Đồng province was designated for management by Đồng Nai city and incorporated into Phước Sơn commune, comprising 129.502 km² from Cát Tiên 2 commune, 88.391 km² from Cát Tiên 3 commune, 54.463 km² from Bảo Lâm 5 commune, 0.213 km² from Đạ Tẻh commune, and 0.034 km² from Đạ Tẻh 3 commune. All transferred areas had a population of zero. Following the adjustment, Phước Sơn commune had an area of 659.163 km² and a population of 31,570 as of 2025.
