= Đức Phong =

Đức Phong may refer to several places in Vietnam:

- Đức Phong, Bình Phước, a township and capital of Bù Đăng District
- Đức Phong, Quảng Ngãi, a rural commune of Mộ Đức District
- Former name of Bù Đăng District
