= List of historical capitals of Vietnam =

This list of historical capitals of Vietnam includes former capital cities as well as the current capital of Vietnam which is Hanoi in time order. The capitals in bold indicate those of independent periods while the capitals in italic indicate those of occupied or invaded periods.

Capital	Period	Nation	Era	Palace	Current location
**Ngàn Hống**	2879 – ? BC	Xích Quỷ	Hồng Bàng dynasty - Kinh Dương Vương	unknown	Hồng Lĩnh mountain, Hà Tĩnh province
**Nghĩa Lĩnh**	? – 2524 BC	Xích Quỷ	Hồng Bàng dynasty - Lạc Long Quân	unknown	Nghĩa Lĩnh mountain, Phú Thọ province
**Phong Châu**	2524–258 BC	Văn Lang	Hồng Bàng dynasty - Hùng king	unknown	Phú Thọ province
**Cổ Loa**	257–208 BC	Âu Lạc	Thục dynasty	Cổ Loa Citadel	Đông Anh commune, Hanoi
**Panyu**	207–111 BC	Nanyue	Triệu dynasty	Nanyue Palace	Guangzhou, Guangdong, China
Leilou	111-106 BC	First Era of Northern Domination		unknown	Bắc Ninh province
Guangxin	106 BC-40 AD	First Era of Northern Domination		unknown	Wuzhou, Guangxi, China
**Mê Linh**	40–43 AD	Lingnan	Trưng sisters	unknown	Mê Linh commune, Hanoi
Guangxin	43-210	Second Era of Northern Domination		unknown	Wuzhou, Guangxi, China
Panyu	210-226?	Second Era of Northern Domination		Nanyue Palace	Guangzhou, Guangdong, China
Longyuan	226?-544	Second Era of Northern Domination		Long Biên Palace	Long Biên ward, Hanoi or Bắc Ninh province (uncertain)
**Long Uyên**	544–602	Vạn Xuân	Early Lý dynasty	Long Biên Palace	Long Biên ward, Hanoi or Bắc Ninh province (uncertain)
Jiaozhi (district)	602-607?	Third Era of Northern Domination		unknown	between Đuống River and Thái Bình River
Songping	607?-713	Third Era of Northern Domination		unknown	Hanoi
**Vạn An**	713–722	Annam (under Tang domination)	Mai Hắc Đế	unknown	Nam Đàn commune, Nghệ An province
Songping	722-779	Third Era of Northern Domination		unknown	Hanoi
**Tống Bình**	779-791	Annam (under Tang domination)	Phùng Hưng	unknown	Hanoi
Songping	791-866	Third Era of Northern Domination		unknown	Hanoi
Dalou	866-905	Third Era of Northern Domination		Đại La Citadel	Ba Đình ward, Hanoi
**Đại La**	905–938	Jinghai	Khúc clan and Dương clan	Đại La Citadel	Ba Đình ward, Hanoi
**Cổ Loa**	939–968	Jinghai	Ngô dynasty	Cổ Loa Citadel	Đông Anh commune, Hanoi
**Hoa Lư**	968–980	Đại Cồ Việt	Đinh dynasty	Hoa Lư Citadel	Tây Hoa Lư ward, Ninh Bình province
**Hoa Lư**	980–1009	Đại Cồ Việt	Early Lê dynasty	Hoa Lư Citadel	Tây Hoa Lư ward, Ninh Bình province
**Hoa Lư**	1009 – 1010	Đại Cồ Việt	Later Lý dynasty	Hoa Lư Citadel	Tây Hoa Lư ward, Ninh Bình province
**Thăng Long**	1010 – 1225	Đại Việt	Later Lý dynasty	Imperial Citadel of Thăng Long	Hanoi
**Thăng Long**	1226–1440	Đại Việt	Trần dynasty	Imperial Citadel of Thăng Long	Hanoi
**Tây Đô**	1400–1407	Đại Ngu	Hồ dynasty	Ho Citadel	Tây Đô commune, Thanh Hóa province
Mô Độ	1407–1409	Jiaozhi (under Ming domination)	Later Trần dynasty	unknown	Yên Mô commune, Ninh Bình province
Dongguan	1407-1427	Fourth Era of Northern Domination		Imperial Citadel of Thăng Long	Hanoi
**Đông Kinh**	1428–1527	Đại Việt	Lê dynasty – early period	Imperial Citadel of Thăng Long	Hanoi
**Đông Kinh**	1527–1592	Đại Việt	Mạc dynasty	Imperial Citadel of Thăng Long	Hanoi
**Vạn Lại**	1533–1597	Đại Việt – southern region	Lê dynasty – warlord period	Van Lai Citadel	Thọ Xuân commune, Thanh Hóa province
**Cao Bình**	1592–1677	Đại Việt – northern region	Mạc dynasty	Ban Phu Citadel	Thục Phán ward, Cao Bằng province
**Đông Kinh**	1597–1789	Đại Việt	Lê dynasty – warlord period	Imperial Citadel of Thăng Long	Hanoi
**Đông Kinh**	1597–1787	Đại Việt – Outer Region	Trịnh lords	Palace of Trịnh Lords	Hanoi
**Phú Xuân**	1678–1777	Đại Việt – Inner Region	Nguyễn lords	Palace of Nguyễn Lords	Phú Xuân ward, Huế
**Qui Nhơn**	1778–1793	Đại Việt	Tây Sơn dynasty	Emperor Citadel	Bình Định ward, Gia Lai province
**Phú Xuân**	1786–1802	Đại Việt	Tây Sơn dynasty	unknown	Phú Xuân ward, Huế
**Huế**	1802–1945	Viet Nam, later Dai Nam	Nguyễn dynasty	Imperial City of Huế	Phú Xuân ward, Huế
Saigon	1887–1901	French Colonial Era	Indochinese Federation	Governor-General Palace	Ho Chi Minh City
Hanoi	1902–1954	French Colonial Era	Indochinese Federation	Indochinese Governor-General Palace	Hanoi
Saigon	1945	Indochina under Japanese occupation		Governor-General Palace	Ho Chi Minh City
Huế	1945	Vietnam	Empire of Vietnam	Imperial City of Huế	Phú Xuân ward, Huế
**Hanoi**	1945–1976	DRV, later North Vietnam	Aftermath of World War II, Cold War	Presidential Palace	Hanoi
**Saigon**	1946–1954	Indochina	Aftermath of World War II	Governor-General Palace	Ho Chi Minh City
**Saigon**	1946–1949	Cochinchina	Aftermath of World War II	Gia Long Palace	Ho Chi Minh City
**Saigon**	1949–1955	State of Vietnam	Cold War	Norodom Palace	Ho Chi Minh City
**Saigon**	1955–1975	Republic of Vietnam	Cold War	Independence Palace	Ho Chi Minh City
Tây Ninh	1969-1972	Provisional Revolutionary Government of the Republic of South Vietnam	Cold War	none	Tây Ninh province
Lộc Ninh	1972–1973	Provisional Revolutionary Government of the Republic of South Vietnam	Cold War	none	Lộc Ninh commune, Đồng Nai province
Cam Lộ	1973-1975	Provisional Revolutionary Government of the Republic of South Vietnam	Cold War	none	Cam Lộ commune, Quảng Trị province
Saigon	1975-1976	Provisional Revolutionary Government of the Republic of South Vietnam	Cold War	Independence Palace	Ho Chi Minh City
**Hanoi**	1976 – present	Socialist Republic of Vietnam	Contemporary history	Presidential Palace	current capital

Some secondary unofficial capitals also existed throughout Vietnamese history. These secondary capitals were established by dynasty founders merely as symbolic capitals to pay tribute to their ancestors.

- Thiên Trường at Nam Định Province during Trần dynasty, existed along with Thăng Long capital
- Lam Kinh at Thanh Hóa Province during Later Lê dynasty, existed along with Đông Kinh capital
- Dương Kinh at Hải Phòng City during Mạc dynasty, existed along with Đông Kinh capital
- Phượng Hoàng Trung Đô at Nghệ An Province during Tây Sơn dynasty, although only in planning and was never completed, existed along with Phú Xuân capital
- Đà Lạt at Lâm Đồng Province during French colonial era as summer capital of Indochinese Federation, existed along with Hanoi capital
- Việt Bắc at northern Vietnam during First Indochina War as Việt Minh's headquarter and de facto capital of Democratic Republic of Vietnam, existed along with de jure Hanoi capital
