= Empress of the Chen dynasty =

Former Chinese Royalty

The Chen dynasty of China had five empresses consort in its 32-year history:

1. Empress Zhang Yao'er (r. 557–559), the wife of Emperor Wu.
2. Empress Shen Miaorong (r. 559–566), the wife of Emperor Chen.
3. Empress Wang (r. 566–568), the wife of Emperor Fei.
4. Empress Liu (r. 569–582), the wife of Emperor Xuan.
5. Empress Shen Wuhua (r. 582–589), the wife of Chen Shubao.
