= Nghĩa Trung (disambiguation) =

Nghĩa Trung may refer to several places in Vietnam, including:

- Nghĩa Trung, a commune of Đồng Nai
- Nghĩa Trung, Đắk Nông, a former ward of Gia Nghĩa
- Nghĩa Trung, Nghệ An, a former rural commune of Nghĩa Đàn District
- Nghĩa Trung, Nam Định, a former rural commune of Nghĩa Hưng District
- Nghĩa Trung, Quảng Ngãi, a former rural commune of Tư Nghĩa District
- Nghĩa Trung, Bắc Giang, a former rural commune of Việt Yên District
