= Empress Shen =

Empress Shen may refer to 2 empresses of the Chen dynasty:

- Shen Miaorong (fl. 546–605), married to Chen Qian (Emperor Wen)
- Shen Wuhua (fl. 569–626), married to Chen Shubao
