= Bù Đăng (disambiguation) =

Bù Đăng may refer to the following places in Vietnam:

- Bù Đăng, Đồng Nai, is a commune of Đồng Nai city, Đồng Nai Province
- Bù Đăng district, is a former district of Bình Phước province
