= Sui–Early Lý War =

Battle in 602

Sui–Lý War
Date	602 CE
Location	Northern Vietnam
Result	Decisive Sui victory: Surrender of Lý Phật Tử to Sui dynasty; Chinese rule in Vietnam re-established

Belligerents
Sui dynasty	Former Lý dynasty

Commanders and leaders
Emperor Wen of Sui; Liu Fang	Lý Phật Tử; Lý Đại Quyền; Lý Phổ Đỉnh

Strength
270,000	Unknown

The Sui–Former Lý War was a military conflict between the Chinese Sui dynasty and the Vietnamese Former Lý dynasty in 602, eventually resulting in the collapse of the latter.

In 601, Lý Phật Tử, ruler of the Former Lý dynasty was summoned to attend the Chinese court. However, he delayed the attendance and eventually rebelled in 602, even though he had recognized Sui authority in 595. He concentrated his military forces at the Vạn Xuân capital Co Loa and at Long Bien. In 602, General Liu Fang led his army in the invasion of Vạn Xuân.

The Sui army departed via Yunnan to the Former Lý territory. However, the Vietnamese army was unprepared to fend them off because they had not expected that the Sui army would take this invasion route. In the end, Lý Phật Tử surrendered to the Sui forces in front of his palace in Long Biên. Consequently, the Chinese took him captive and transferred him to the Chinese capital Chang'an, although he died on the way. Liu Fang's army also forced the submission or defeated the remaining local clans. The conquered territory was re-incorporated into China.

== See also ==
- Sui–Lâm Ấp war

== Bibliography ==
- Taylor, K.W. (2013). A History of the Vietnamese. Cambridge: Cambridge University Press. ISBN 978-0-521-87586-8.
- Walker, Hugh Dyson (2012). East Asia: A New History. AuthorHouse. ISBN 9781477265161.
