= Triệu Việt Vương =

Triệu Việt Vương 趙越王
- King of Vạn Xuân
- Reign: 548–555 co-reigned with Lý Thiên Bảo, 555–571 as sole ruler
- Predecessor: Lý Nam Đế
- Successor: Hậu Lý Nam Đế
- Born: 26 January 524; Zhu Jian, Jiaozhou, Liang China
- Died: 571
- Issue: ?
Names
- Triệu Quang Phục (趙光復)
Regnal name
- Dạ Trạch Vương (夜澤王)
- Dynasty: Early Lý dynasty
- Father: Triệu Tục
- Mother: Nguyễn Thị Hựu

Triệu Việt Vương (Chữ Hán 趙越王, 524–571), born Triệu Quang Phục (趙光復), was a king of the Vietnamese Early Lý dynasty in the 6th century. He was co-ruler alongside Lý Thiên Bảo from 548 until Lý Thiên Bảo's death in 555, upon which he became sole sovereign until his death in 571. Unlike the other rulers of the early Lý Dynasty, Triệu Việt Vương did not belong to the Lý family, and instead obtained his high position by being the commanding general of Vạn Xuân, where he was best known for leading a resistance against the Liang dynasty that tried to regain Vạn Xuân. He was a pioneer in waging guerrilla war tactics.

== Early life ==
Little is recorded about Triệu Việt Vương's (born Triệu Quang Phục) early life, other than the fact that he was the son of Triệu Tục, a senior military leader under Lý Nam Đế. He was born on 26 January 524 in Zhu Jian (today Hưng Yên province).

== Rise to power ==
During the 530s, Vietnam was a province of the Chinese Liang dynasty. It was governed by Xiao Zi (蕭諮), a nephew of the Liang emperor, Emperor Wu. Xiao Zi's rule was marked by corruption and cruelty. In late 540, a local magistrate, Lý Bôn, rallied local Việt officials and soldiers to support his cause for independence. Among them was Triệu Tục, whose frustrations with Xiao Zi’s incompetence spurred him into joining the group. After hearing news of the rebellion, Emperor Wu, the Liang Emperor, sent an army southward in attempt to crush the rebellion led by Lý Bí. Lý Bôn made use of tactical withdrawals against the Liang forces, who were defeated by Lý’s army, according to historical Chinese sources. In 548, Lý Bôn was killed by Lǎo (ms. 獠) tribesmen (a Tai-Kadai ethnic group) while on retreat from the Hong River Plain. Facing inevitable defeat and dwindling military supplies, Triệu Túc realized he could not endure the long campaign, and consequently appointed his trusted son, Triệu Quang Phục, to lead the resisting forces after the emperor's death. By this time, Triệu Quang Phục had followed his father's footsteps in establishing himself as a notable resistance leader in the Hong River Plain.

== Resistance against the Liang dynasty ==
Recognizing the superior strength of the Liang army, Triệu Quang Phục often retreated to more favorable terrain, mainly in the swamps and marshlands. He stationed his army in the forests for tactical advantage, where he was able to employ guerrilla warfare and wage a war of attrition against the Liang army. Triệu would rest his army during the day and attack the Liang army at night, seizing goods and killing many Chinese soldiers. Afterwards, he would quickly retreat back to his stronghold before the Chinese could reassemble their army to counter-attack.

After the assassination of Lý Nam Đế in 548, his elder brother, Lý Thiên Bảo, became the de facto ruler of Vạn Xuân. Lý Thiên Bảo died of an illness in 555 and left no heirs, which prompted the military and officials to elect Triệu Quang Phục as leader and de facto ruler. He took the regnal name Triệu Việt Vương. However, his election was not undisputed, as other prominent family members of Lý Nam Đế challenged Triệu Quang Phục's leadership. While Triệu Quang Phục claimed rightful succession through the approval of the court officials, military, and general populace, the Lý family claimed rightful leadership through primogeniture, since they were still considered the rightful ruling family.

As strong as the Chinese were, they could not make any headway against Triệu Quang Phục’s style of warfare. This indecisive period lasted until 557, when a respite finally came for the Lý forces. Hou Jing revolted against the Liang dynasty, and the leading Liang general in Vietnam, Chen Batian, was recalled back to China to help quell the uprising. The Vietnamese forces, however, had no time to rejoice at the news of this temporary reprieve.

== Civil war ==
Shortly after Lý Thiên Bảo died, his cousin, Lý Phật Tử, claimed the imperial throne and challenged Triệu Việt Vương. A civil war broke out for the throne with no decisive victory. Wary about engaging in internal fighting that would only frustrate the people, Triệu Việt Vương sued for peace. Subsequently, all the lands north of Long Biên would be under Lý Phật Tử's rule, and the land south of Long Biên would belong to Triệu Việt Vương.

In 571, Lý Phật Tự broke the truce and attacked Triệu Quang Phục's domain. Since Triệu Quang Phục's domain was not prepared for this assault, they were easily defeated. His capital was sacked and burned by Lý Phật Tự's forces, however, he managed to escape. During his retreat, Triệu Quang Phục committed suicide. Triệu Quang Phục's remaining forces and territories surrendered and were incorporated into Lý Phật Tự's domains.

== Notes ==
Preceded by Lý Thiên Bảo	Ruler of Vietnam; 548–571	Succeeded by Hậu Lý Nam Đế
