= Shen Miaorong =

Empress Ande of Chen (Chinese: 安德皇后), personal name Shen Miaorong (Chinese: 沈妙容) (fl.535–605), was an empress of the Chinese Chen dynasty. Her husband was Emperor Wen (Chen Qian), a nephew of the founding Emperor Wu (Chen Baxian).

== Early life ==
Shen Miaorong was from Wuxing Commandery (吳興, roughly modern Huzhou, Zhejiang) as was her husband's clan. Her father Shen Fashen (沈法深) was an army officer during the Liang dynasty. Her mother's name was Gao (高), but Lady Gao's surname is lost to history. Shen Miaorong married Chen Qian when she was a teenager, and while the exact year is not known, the marriage took place during Emperor Wu of Liang's Datong (大同) era (535-546).

Chen Baxian was a Liang general, and after the Liang capital Jiankang fell to the rebel general Hou Jing in 549, he participated in the campaigns against Hou. In response, Hou arrested not only Chen Baxian's wife Zhang Yao'er and son Chen Chang, but also arrested Chen Qian and Lady Shen. They were only released after Emperor Yuan of Liang's army, commanded by Wang Sengbian and with Chen Baxian as Wang's lieutenant, defeated Hou in 552, and recaptured Jiankang.

== Empress ==
In 557, Chen Baxian, then effectively in control of Liang's imperial government after Emperor Yuan's execution by Western Wei forces in 555 and his own coup against Wang later that year, had Emperor Jing of Liang yield the throne to him, establishing Chen dynasty as Emperor Wu. Emperor Wu created Chen Qian the Prince of Linchuan and, particularly because Chen Qian was then his only close relative in Chen territory (Chen Chang and Chen Qian's brother Chen Xu having been taken captive to Chang'an, the capital of Western Wei and its successor state Northern Zhou), relied on him heavily. Lady Shen became the Princess of Linchuan. When Emperor Wu died in 559 with Chen Chang still under Northern Zhou control and unable to return, Chen Qian took the throne as Emperor Wen. He crowned Princess Shen empress and her son Chen Bozong crown prince. Her other son, Chen Bomao (陳伯茂), was declared the Prince of Shixing to inherit the title that Chen Baxian had posthumously created for Chen Qian's father Chen Daotan (陳道譚). It is not known whether she bore Emperor Wen any daughters. Emperor Wen posthumously named Empress Shen's father the Marquess of Jiancheng and her mother Lady Gao the Marchioness of Sui'an.

== Empress dowager ==
In 566, Emperor Wen died, and Chen Bozong succeeded to the throne as Emperor Fei. He honored his mother as empress dowager and established her residence at Ande Palace (安德宮). Pursuant to Emperor Wen's will, the government was in the hands of Chen Xu (whom Northern Zhou had allowed to return to Chen in 562), the Prince of Ancheng, and the officials Dao Zhongju (到仲舉) and Liu Shizhi (劉師知), and all three stayed in the palace. In spring 567, Liu, suspicious of Chen Xu's intentions, tried to remove him from power. However, Chen Xu's associate Mao Xi (毛喜), after confirming with Empress Dowager Shen and Emperor Fei that neither approved of Liu's actions, reported this to Chen Xu, who arrested Chen and forced him to commit suicide. Dao was demoted, and Chen Xu took full control of the imperial government. Empress Dowager Shen, unhappy about the result, instructed her eunuch Jiang Yu (蔣裕) to encourage Zhang Anguo (張安國), a man from Jian'an Commandery (建安, roughly modern Nanping, Fujian), to rebel, but after Zhang's rebellion was discovered and suppressed, she killed her attendants who knew about the plan.

In winter 568, Chen Xu had an edict issued in the name of Emperor Wu's wife Grand Empress Dowager Zhang, deposing Emperor Fei and making himself emperor. Emperor Fei was demoted to the title of Prince of Linhai, while Chen Bomao, who had participated in Liu's plot and had publicly declared his disapproval of Chen Xu, was demoted in rank to Marquess of Wenma and exiled. Chen Xu subsequently had Chen Bomao killed, but did not kill the Prince of Linhai. He took the throne (as Emperor Xuan) formally in spring 569, and while not continuing to honor her as empress dowager, he honored her as Empress Wen. Little is known about her activities during the reigns of Emperor Xuan and his son Chen Shubao. In 589, Chen dynasty fell to rival Sui dynasty's armies. Most members of Chen's imperial clan, including her, were taken to the Sui capital Chang'an. She returned to former Chen territory sometime during the reign of Emperor Yang of Sui (605-617), and died soon thereafter.

Chinese royalty
Preceded by Empress Zhang Yao'er	Empress of the Chen dynasty 559-566	Succeeded by Empress Wang
Preceded by Empress Zhang Yao'er	Empress of China (Southeastern); 559-566	Succeeded by Empress Wang
Preceded by Empress Wang of the Liang dynasty	Empress of China (Hunan); 561-566	Succeeded by Empress Wang
