= Wang Shaoji =

Wang Shaoji (Chinese: 王少姬) was an empress of the Chinese Chen dynasty. Her husband was Emperor Fei (Chen Bozong).

Her father Wang Gu (王固) was a mid-level official during the Liang and early Chen Dynasties, and was a nephew of Liang's founder Emperor Wu of Liang. She married Chen Bozong in 560, when he was crown prince under his father Emperor Wen, and carried the title of Crown Princess. Her age at that time was not known, while he was either six or eight. In 566, she gave birth to the only son of his known to history, Chen Zhize (陳至澤).

Later in 566, Emperor Wen died, and Chen Bozong took the throne (as Emperor Fei). He created Crown Prince Wang empress and, in 567, he created her son Chen Zhize crown prince. Almost immediately, however, fights broke out between the officials that Emperor Wen put in charge of important matters. The victor, Emperor Fei's uncle Chen Xu the Prince of Ancheng, deposed Emperor Fei in winter 568 and took the throne himself in spring 569 (as Emperor Xuan). Emperor Fei was demoted to the title of Prince of Linhai, and the empress became the Princess of Linhai. In 570, the Prince of Linhai died, and Chen Zhize inherited the title of the Prince of Linhai. Presumably, she then became the Princess Dowager of Linhai. She died during Emperor Xuan's son Chen Shubao's Zhide (至德) era (583-586), but the exact year of her death is not known.

Chinese royalty
Preceded by Empress Shen Miaorong	Empress of Chen Dynasty; 566–568	Succeeded by Empress Liu
