= Early Lý dynasty =

Vietnamese dynasty (AD 544 -- 602)

Vạn Xuân (萬春) Nam Việt (南越)
- 544–602
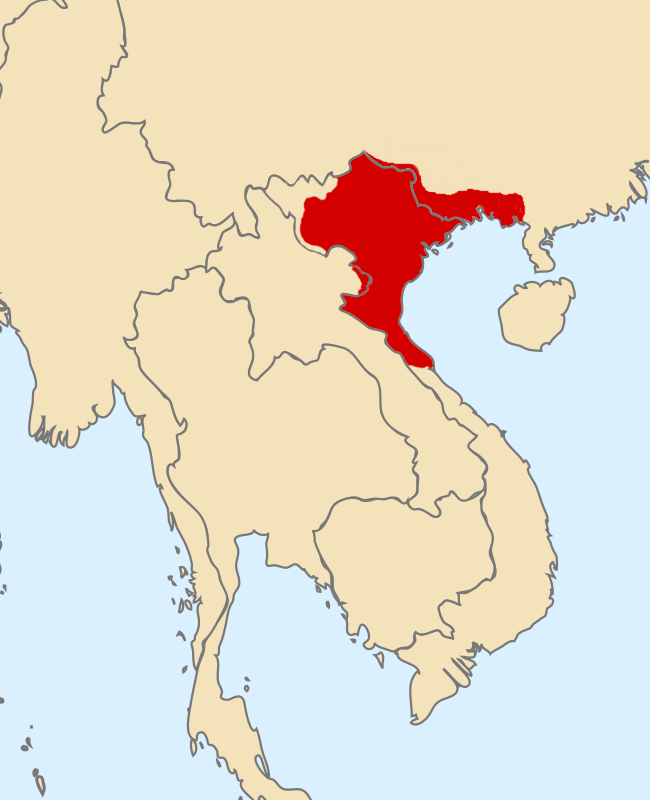
- Map of Vạn Xuân dynasty
- Capital: Long Biên
- Common languages: Proto-Vietnamese
- Religion: Buddhism, Taoism, Vietnamese folk religion
- Government: Monarchy
- Emperor
  - 544–548: Lý Nam Đế (First)
  - 548–571: Triệu Việt Vương (Middle)
  - 571–602: Hậu Lý Nam Đế (Last)
- Historical era: Medieval Asia
  - Lý Bí revolted against Liang China: 541
  - Lý Bí proclaimed himself Emperor: 544
  - Triệu Quang Phục claimed himself the new emperor: 555
  - Lý Phật Tử defeated Triệu Việt Vương and regained the throne: 571
  - Surrender of Hậu Lý Nam Đế: 602
- Currency: Cash coins
Preceded by	Succeeded by
Second Era of Northern Domination	Third Era of Northern Domination
- Today part of: Vietnam; China

The Early Lý dynasty (Vietnamese: nhà Tiền Lý; chữ Nôm: 茹前李), also known in historiography as the Former Lý dynasty or Anterior Lý dynasty, officially Vạn Xuân (chữ Hán: 萬春; "Myriad Spring") or Nam Việt (chữ Hán: 南越; "Southern Việt"), was a dynasty of Vietnam that existed from AD 544 to 602. Its founder Lý Bí assumed the title of "Emperor of Southern Việt", which was later shortened to "Southern Emperor" (Lý Nam Đế). The capital was located at Long Biên within modern-day Hanoi.

== Lý Bí and the Kingdom of Vạn Xuân ==
Lý Bí (503–548) was born in Thái Bình,(Sơn Tây). In 543, he and his brother Lý Thiên Bảo revolted against the Chinese Liang dynasty to gain independence. Many reasons are given for the motive of his revolt, among them the fact that he was a member of a wealthy family and, having failed an imperial examination, decided to revolt.

According to The Đại Việt sử ký toàn thư, Lý Bôn (李賁, sometimes rendered as Lý Bí) was a local aristocrat whose ancestors were "northerners" (Chinese) who fled Wang Mang's seizure of power during the interregnum between the Western Han and Eastern Han dynasties five centuries earlier. The Book of Qi and Book of Chen both describe Lý Bôn as a rebel leader spawning from the regional governing elite rather than a barbarian or a foreigner. However his relative Phật Tử was described as a Lĭ (俚) barbarian (man), which Michael Churchman attributes to a process of localization and attribution of foreign barbarian traits by Tang writers. According to James R. Chamberlain, Lý Bôn's rebellion followed the same pattern as a disenchanted Chinese commander and the form of government and culture that followed his rule was the same as imperial China. However Chamberlain also states that in the following struggle between Lý Bôn and the Liang, the forces of Lý Bôn were described as the Lao. After his brother Lý Thiên Bảo was defeated, his forces fled into the mountains with the Lao. The last Lý emperor, Hậu Lý Nam Đế, was said to be supported by Lao people.

Lý Bí declared himself emperor of Nam Việt in the tradition of Triệu Đà and organized an imperial court at Long Biên.

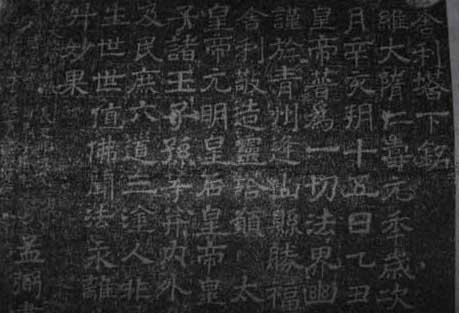
Buddhist inscription written in 601 CE in Tran Quoc pagoda

In 544, Lý Bí defeated the Liang dynasty, proclaimed himself emperor and named the country Vạn Xuân. At this time, he built the Trấn Quốc Pagoda in Hanoi.

== Resistance against the Liang ==
In 545, Emperor Wu of Liang sent troops to recapture the region. In 546, Gia Ninh fortress fell, Lý Bí and his army fled and waged guerrilla warfare against the Liang.

While the Lý family retreated to the mountains and attempted to rule in the style of their Chinese overlords, a rebel leader who based his rule on an indigenous form of kingship arose in the Red River Delta. Triệu Quang Phục made his headquarters on an island in a vast swamp. From this refuge, he could strike without warning, seizing supplies from the Liang army and then slipping back into the labyrinthine channels of the swamp. According to a much later Vietnamese revolutionary, General Võ Nguyên Giáp, Vietnamese concepts of protracted warfare were born in the surprise offensives, night attacks, and hit-and-run tactics employed by Triệu Quang Phục.

After the assassination of Lý Nam Đế in 547, his elder brother, Lý Thiên Bảo, became the de facto ruler of Vạn Xuân. Lý Thiên Bảo died of an illness in 555 and left no heirs, this prompted the military and officials elected Triệu Quang Phục as leader and de facto ruler. However, his election to lead the war against the Liang was not undisputed as other prominent family members of Lý Nam Đế began to challenge Triệu Quang Phục leadership. The remaining Lý family members and Triệu Quang Phục alliance began to fall apart as both sides claim legitimacy. While Triệu Quang Phục claimed rightful succession garnered through court officials, military, and the general populace. On the other hand, Lý family members claimed rightful leadership must be upheld through traditional hereditary as they were still considered to be the ruling family in name.

As strong as the Chinese were, they could not make any headway against the type of warfare devised by the generalissimo Triệu Việt Vương. This indecisive period lasted until 557 when finally a respite came for Vạn Xuân. The Liang dynasty was under the civil war during the Hou Jing rebellion and the famous Chinese general Chen Baxian's (Trần Bá Tiên) skills and troops were needed in his homeland to quell a revolt. The Vietnamese forces, however, had no time to rejoice at the news of this temporary respite.

== Civil war ==
Shortly after Lý Thiên Bảo died, a Lý family member, Lý Phật Tử (Lý Thiên Bảo's cousin) made claim to the imperial throne and challenged Triệu Quang Phục. Both sides vied against one another and civil war broke out for the throne with no decisive victory. Wary about engaging in internal fighting that would only frustrate the people, Triệu Việt Vương negotiated a truce and peace. From Long Biên northward would be under Lý Phật Tử's rule and the land south of Long Biên would belong to Triệu Việt Vương.

In 571, Lý Phật Tử broke the truce and attacked Triệu Quang Phục's domain. Since Triệu Quang Phục's domain was not prepared or imagined Lý Phật Tử would attack, therefore they were easily defeated. His capital was sacked and burned by Lý Phật Tử's forces, however he managed to escape. During his retreat, Triệu Quang Phục committed suicide. Triệu Quang Phục's remaining forces and territories surrendered and were incorporated into Lý Phật Tử's domains.

== Sui invasion ==
The newly formed Sui Empire defeated the Chen dynasty in 589, unifying China in the process. Emperor Wen of Sui sent envoy to Vạn Xuân, demanded Lý Phật Tử to submit as a vassal state, but Lý had refused. In 602, Lý Phật Tử bribed money to governor of Qi Zhuo Lệnh Hồ Hy, Emperor Wen of Sui felt angry and executed Lệnh Hồ Hy for corruption. He ordered general Liu Fang invade Vạn Xuân with 100,000 troops. The emperor of Vạn Xuân (Lý Phật Tử) surrendered to the Sui, marking the beginning of renewed Chinese domination in Vietnam.

== Anterior Lý dynasty monarchs ==
- Lý Nam Đế I (r. 542–548) Lý Nam Đế's pre-throne name was Lý Bí, also known as Lý Bôn.
- Lý Thiên Bảo (r. 548–555, co-reigned with Triệu Quang Phục)
- Triệu Việt Vương (r. 548–571, 555–571 as sole ruler)
- Lý Nam Đế II (Lý Phật Tử) (r. 571–602)
- Lý Sư Lợi (603)

== Notes ==
Preceded by Second Chinese rule	Dynasty of Vietnam; 544–602	Succeeded by Third Chinese rule
