= Chen Chang =

Imperial prince of the Chinese Chen dynasty

Chen Chang (陳昌) (c. 537 – 5 May 560), courtesy name Jingye (敬業), formally Prince Xian of Hengyang (衡陽獻王), was an imperial prince of the Chinese Chen dynasty. He was the sixth and only surviving son of the founding emperor Emperor Wu (Chen Baxian), but as he was detained as a hostage by Western Wei and Western Wei's successor state Northern Zhou, was unable to succeed to the throne when Emperor Wu died in 559. Rather, his cousin Chen Qian took the throne as Emperor Wen. Northern Zhou finally allowed him to return to Chen in 560, but as he wrote impolite letters to Emperor Wen, Emperor Wen felt threatened (as he viewed the letters as implied demands for the throne), and he sent his trusted general Hou Andu to escort Chen Chang. Hou subsequently drowned Chen Chang in the Yangtze River.

== Early life ==
Chen Chang was born in 537, as the son of Chen Baxian and his second wife, Empress Zhang Yao'er, during the reign of Emperor Wu of Liang; Chen Chang was Chen Baxian's sixth son. When Chen Baxian was invited by Xiao Ying (蕭映) the Marquess of Xinyu, who was also the governor of Guang Province (廣州, modern Guangdong), to serve on Xiao Ying's staff, around 540, it appeared that both Lady Zhang and Chen Chang accompanied him to Guang Province, but when he was subsequently commissioned in 544 to campaign against the rebel Li Ben in modern northern Vietnam, he sent them back to his home commandery of Wuxing (吳興, roughly modern Huzhou, Zhejiang). When the general Hou Jing rebelled in 548 and subsequently captured the Liang capital Jiankang in 549, both Lady Zhang and Chen Chang were taken captive by Hou, but despite Chen Baxian's subsequent major participation in the campaign against Hou, Hou did not kill Lady Zhang or Chen Chang.

After Hou was defeated in 552, for Chen Baxian's contributions in the campaign, Emperor Yuan of Liang created Chen Baxian the Marquess of Changcheng, and Chen Chang received the title of the Heir Apparent of Changcheng. Emperor Yuan also made him the governor of Wuxing Commandery, despite his young age. Chen Baxian sent the officials Xie Zhe (謝哲) and Cai Jingli (蔡景歷) to assist him in governance, and the scholar Du Zhiwei (杜之偉) to teach him in his studies. As a young man, Chen Chang was described to be handsome and intelligent.

== Detention by Western Wei and Northern Zhou ==
In winter 552, Emperor Yuan summoned Chen Chang and Chen Baxian's nephew Chen Xu to the then-capital Jiangling, making them low-level imperial officials but effectively using them as hostages to guarantee Chen Baxian's loyalty. In 554, Western Wei forces attacked Jiangling and captured it, and around the new year 555, they put Emperor Yuan to death. Much of the population of Jiangling were taken to Western Wei as captives, and Chen Chang and Chen Xu, while they were treated with respect, were also taken to the Western Wei capital Chang'an.

Chen Baxian and his commanding general, Wang Sengbian, who controlled the eastern provinces of Liang, refused to recognize the emperor installed by Western Wei, Emperor Xuan of Western Liang, instead initially intending to install Emperor Yuan's son Xiao Fangzhi the Prince of Jin'an as the new Liang emperor. However, in spring 555, fearful of Northern Qi attacks, Wang accepted the candidate proposed by Northern Qi, Emperor Yuan's cousin Xiao Yuanming. Displeased over this selection, Chen made a surprise attack on Jiankang in fall 555, killing Wang and deposing Xiao Yuanming, making Xiao Fangzhi emperor (as Emperor Jing). In 557, he had Emperor Jing yield the throne to him, establishing the Chen dynasty (as Emperor Wu).

After Emperor Wu took the throne, he made repeated requests to Northern Zhou (which had now succeeded Western Wei) to return Chen Chang and Chen Xu. The Northern Zhou government agreed but did not actually return Chen Chang and Chen Xu. In 559, when Emperor Wu died suddenly, the officials therefore supported Chen Chang's cousin (Chen Xu's brother) Chen Qian the Prince of Linchuan as Emperor Wu's successor, and he took the throne as Emperor Wen.

== Death ==
For reasons unknown, only after hearing Emperor Wu's death did Northern Zhou send Chen Chang on his way to Chen territory. However, because the Liang general Wang Lin, who had by that point supported the Liang prince Xiao Zhuang as emperor, controlled the parts of Yangtze River that Chen Chang was required to travel on to reach Jiankang, Chen Chang was unable to proceed much on his journey, and he had to stop at Anlu (安陸, in modern Xiaogan, Hubei).

In spring 560, Emperor Wen's forces, under the general Hou Tian, defeated Wang Lin's, and both Wang and Xiao Zhuang fled to Northern Qi. The territory that Wang formerly controlled were divided between Chen and Northern Zhou, and Chen Chang's road was clear. As Chen Chang proceeded from Anlu to the Yangtze River, he wrote impolite letters to Emperor Wen, which Emperor Wen took as a demand for the throne. Emperor Wen summoned his general Hou Andu, suggesting that perhaps he should yield the throne to Chen Chang and accept a princely title. Hou advised him not to and offered to personally "greet" Chen Chang. Meanwhile, the officials were all suggesting creating Chen Chang an imperial prince, and Emperor Wen declared that Chen Chang was to be created the Prince of Hengyang.

A month later, Chen Chang entered Chen territory and met Hou. However, as they travelled on the Yangtze River, Hou had him killed and his body thrown into the Yangtze, and then returned to Jiankang, claiming that Chen Chang had slipped into the river. As Chen Chang had no sons, Emperor Wen had his own son Chen Boxin (陳伯信) adopted into Chen Chang's line to inherit the title of Prince of Hengyang.
