= Emperor Fei of Chen =

Emperor of the Chen dynasty from 566 to 568

Emperor Fei of Chen 陳廢帝
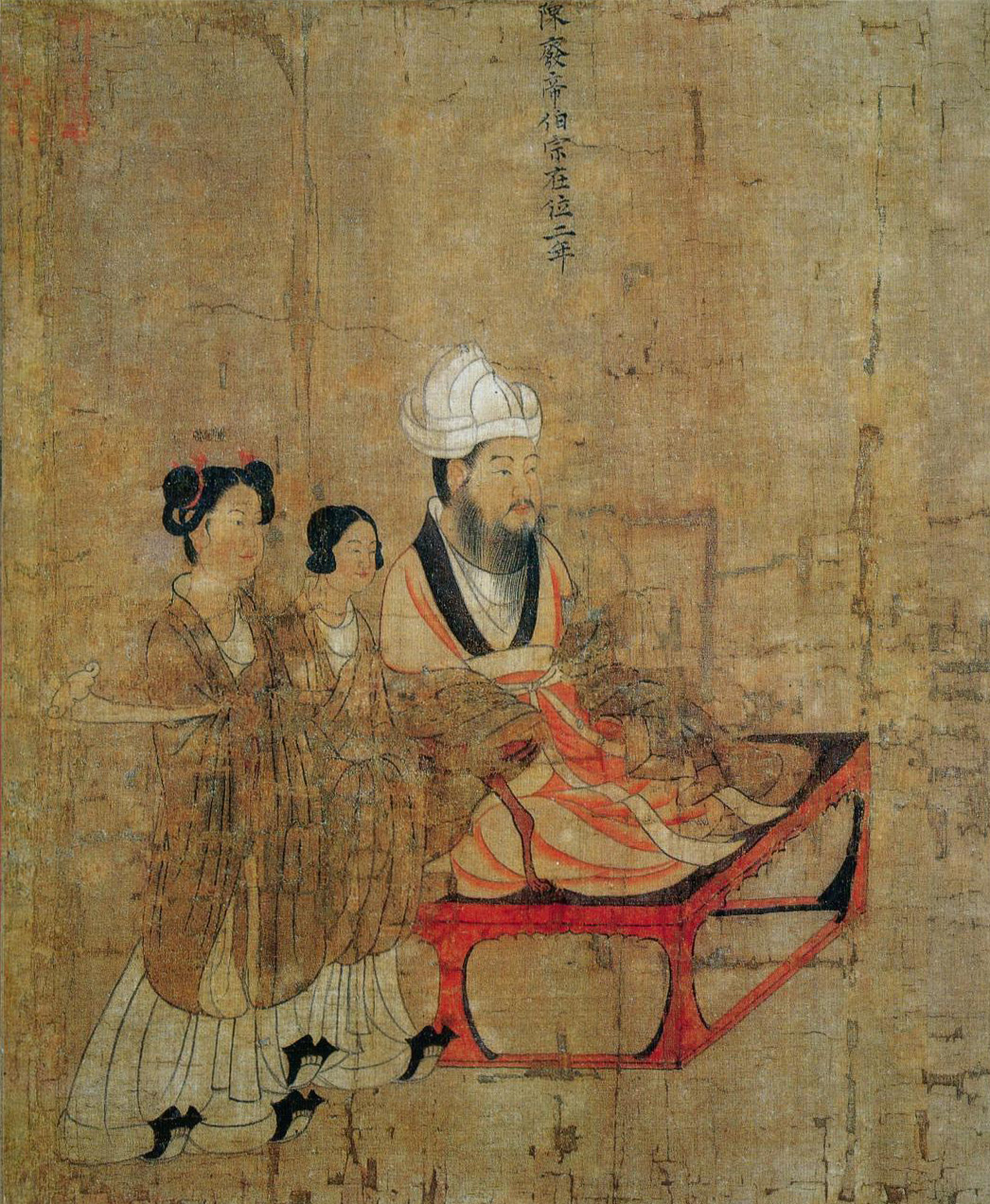
- Tang dynasty portrait of Emperor Fei by Yan Liben

Emperor of the Chen dynasty
- Reign: 31 May 566 – 27 December 568
- Predecessor: Emperor Wen
- Successor: Emperor Xuan
- Born: Chen Yaowang (陳藥王); 554? (Note: The 554 date is per the Book of Chen, but has major problems, in that the Book of Chen also indicates that his age at death in 570 was 18. This would he was born in 551 or 552, which would also fit better with his brothers' birthdates, several of which are also problematic as rendered in the Book of Chen. One might be able to speculate that his given birth date of 554 (Third year of the Liang dynasty's Chengsheng (承聖) era), was erroneously rendered and should have been given as the third year of the Dabao (大寶) era (552)— an era name, incidentally, was not recognized by Emperor Yuan of Liang under the rationale that his brother Emperor Jianwen of Liang, who used the era name, was being controlled by the rebel general Hou Jing. But such speculation, while it would make dates fit better, is not directly supported by text evidence. See Emperor Wen of Chen for more details.)
- Died: 570 (aged 15–16)
- Consorts: Wang Shaoji of Langya
- Issue: Chen Zhize
Names
- Family name: Chen (陳); Given name: Bozong (伯宗); Courtesy name: Fengye (奉業); Childhood name: Yaowang (藥王)
Era name and dates
- Guāngdà (光大): 566-568
- Dynasty: Chen dynasty
- Father: Emperor Wen
- Mother: Empress Ande

Emperor Fei of Chen (陳廢帝) (died c.May 570), personal name Chen Bozong (陳伯宗), courtesy name Fengye (奉業), childhood name Yaowang (藥王), also known by his post-deposition title of Prince of Linhai (臨海王), was the third emperor of the Chinese Chen dynasty. He was the son and heir of Emperor Wen, but after he came to the throne in 566, the imperial administration fell into infighting almost immediately. The victor, Emperor Fei's uncle Chen Xu (Emperor Xuan), deposed Emperor Fei in winter 568 and took the throne himself.

== Background ==
Traditionally histories indicate that Chen Bozong was born in 554, but he could have been born in 552 or another year. At the time of his birth, his father Chen Qian was serving as a general under Chen Baxian, Chen Bozong's granduncle, who was one of the more prominent generals of Liang Dynasty at that time. His mother was Chen Qian's wife Shen Miaorong. He was their first son. (Lady Shen would bear one more son, Chen Bomao (陳伯茂), after him.)

In 555, Chen Baxian became even more prominent after overthrowing his commanding general Wang Sengbian and replacing the emperor Xiao Yuanming with Emperor Jing. During the next few years, Chen Baxian consolidated power, and in 557, he had Emperor Jing yield the throne to him, establishing Chen Dynasty as its Emperor Wu. Chen Qian, as the emperor's nephew and the only close male relative of the new emperor in Chen territory, was created the Prince of Linchuan. In 558, Chen Bozong received the title of Heir Apparent of Linchuan.

In 559, Emperor Wu died after a sudden illness. As Chen Qian was his only close male relative in Chen territory, the imperial officials supported Chen Qian to succeed him, and Chen Qian did so (as Emperor Wen). He created Chen Bozong crown prince and created Chen Bozong's mother Princess Shen empress.

In 562, Emperor Wen selected the daughter of the official Wang Gu (王固) to be Chen Bozong's wife. She thereafter carried the title of Crown Princess. They had a son, Chen Zhize (陳至澤), in 566.

In his youth, Crown Prince Bozong was considered to be weak in his personality. In 566, when Emperor Wen grew ill, he, worried that Crown Prince Bozong would not be able to keep his position as emperor, offered to pass the throne to his brother and Crown Prince Bozong's uncle Chen Xu the Prince of Ancheng. Chen Xu declined, and the official Kong Huan (孔奐) also opposed. Emperor Wen therefore did not make Chen Xu crown prince, but entrusted the important matters to Chen Xu, Kong, Dao Zhongju (到仲舉), Yuan Shu (袁樞), and Liu Shizhi (劉師知). He soon died, and Crown Prince Bozong took the throne (as Emperor Fei).

== Reign ==
Emperor Fei honored his grandaunt (Emperor Wu's wife) Empress Dowager Zhang Yao'er grand empress dowager and his mother Empress Shen empress dowager. He created his wife Crown Princess Wang empress. (Her son Chen Zhize was created crown prince in fall 567.)

As per the arrangement left by Emperor Wen, Emperor Fei's reign was characterized initially by a collective leadership of the key officials Emperor Wen left in place. However, by spring 567, the officials have largely coalesced into two factions—one led by Dao Zhongju and Liu Shizhi, and one faction led by Chen Xu. Dao, Liu, and Chen Xu took up residence in the palace and handled most of the sensitive matters. In spring 567, Liu tried to exclude Chen Xu by having the official Yin Buning (殷不佞) informing Chen Xu that he should leave the palace to attend to the affairs of the capital region Yang Province (揚州), of which Chen Xu was also governor. When Chen Xu considered doing so, his associate Mao Xi (毛喜) and the general Wu Mingche persuaded him that he needed to remain in the palace. Chen Xu therefore invited Liu to a meeting—and while the meeting was still going on, had Mao confirming with Empress Dowager Shen and Emperor Fei that it was not their order that he leave the palace. Once Mao confirmed so, Chen Xu arrested Liu and ordered him to commit suicide, while demoting Dao to a lesser position. From this point on, the administration was controlled by Chen Xu.

Fearful of what would come next, Dao and the general Han Zigao (韓子高) considered actions against Chen Xu, but before they could take any actions against Chen Xu, their plot was reported to Chen Xu, and Chen Xu arrested them and then had Emperor Fei issue an edict ordering them to commit suicide. Emperor Fei's brother Chen Bomao the Prince of Shixing, whom Chen Xu believed to have participated in both Liu's and Dao and Han's plots, was stripped of his governmental posts and ordered to keep Emperor Fei company.

The deaths of Liu and Han, both of whom were close associates of Emperor Wen, brought fear into the heart of another associate of Emperor Wen—Hua Jiao (華皎) the governor of Xiang Province (湘州, modern central Hunan). In summer 567, Hua therefore submitted himself to Northern Zhou and Northern Zhou's vassal state, Western Liang. Chen Xu sent Wu and Chunyu Liang (淳于量) to lead a fleet against the joint forces of Hua, Northern Zhou, and Western Liang. The opposing sides met at Dunkou (沌口, in modern Wuhan, Hubei). Wu and Chunyu were able to ram Hua's, Northern Zhou's, and Western Liang's fleets, causing them to collapse. Both Hua and the Northern Zhou general Yuwen Zhi (宇文直) the Duke of Wei fled to Western Liang's capital Jiangling (江陵, in modern Jingzhou, Hubei), while the Northern Zhou general Yuan Ding (元定) were captured. Wu followed up by putting Jiangling under siege in spring 568, but was not able to capture it and subsequently forced to withdraw.

Meanwhile, Chen Xu was receiving greater formal titles and authorities. Chen Bomao, angry over the situation, was making repeated denigrations of Chen Xu, who then resolved to take the throne himself. In winter 568, Chen Xu had an edict issued in Grand Empress Dowager Zhang's name, falsely accusing Emperor Fei of having been part of the plots of Liu and Hua. The edict further stated that Emperor Wen had already known that Emperor Fei was unsuitable, and that Emperor Wen's stated desire to have Chen Xu take the throne should be carried out. Emperor Fei was deposed and demoted to the title of Prince of Linhai, while Chen Bomao was demoted to Marquess of Wenma and subsequently assassinated.

== After reign ==
More than a month after Emperor Fei was deposed, Chen Xu took the throne (as Emperor Xuan). Little is known about the Prince of Linhai's activities during his uncle's reign. He died in spring 570, and his title was inherited by his son Chen Zhize.

== Family ==
- Princess consort, of the Wang clan of Langya (王妃 琊瑯王氏), personal name Shaoji (少姬)
  - Chen Zhize, Prince of Linhai (臨海王 陳至澤; b. 566), first son

Regnal titles
Preceded by Emperor Wen of Chen	Emperor of Chen Dynasty; 566–568	Succeeded by Emperor Xuan of Chen
