= Hậu Lý Nam Đế =

Hậu Lý Nam Đế 後李南帝
- Emperor of Vạn Xuân
- Reign: 571–602
- Predecessor: Triệu Việt Vương
- Successor: Dynasty collapsed
- Born: 518; Jiaozhou, Liang China
- Died: 602; Xi'an, Sui China
- Burial: Chang'an
- Issue: Lý Nhã Lang
Names
- Lý Phật Tử (李佛子)
- Dynasty: Early Lý dynasty
- Father: Lý Nam Đế (Uncle)

Hậu Lý Nam Đế (後李南帝, born Lý Phật Tử (李佛子), c. 518 – 602) was the last king of the Early Lý dynasty, founded by his cousin Lý Nam Đế. He reigned in Vạn Xuân (present-day north Vietnam) from 571 to 602.

== Clash with Triệu Việt Vương ==
Phật Tử was a cousin of Lý Nam Đế, whose ancestors were said to be of northern descent (Chinese) who fled south during Wang Mang's usurpation during the 1st century AD and had become localized after seven generations. However, Phật Tử was referred as a Lĭ (俚) barbarian (man) whereas Lý Bí was not. According to Michael Churchman, this may have been the result of a process in which purported Chinese lineages became localized over time and were attributed uncivilized foreigner status by Tang writers. It may also mean Lý Phật Tử was a leader of Tai-speakers, who historically inhabited the Red River Delta from 200 AD to 700 AD.

Lý Phật Tử and Triệu Việt Vương had a peace agreement in place; however, Lý Phật Tử had ambitions to claim to the entire territory of Việt people. Around 570 AD, Lý Phật Tử's army overran Long Biên, a region that belonged to Triệu Việt Vương, and seized it. Triệu Việt Vương was caught by surprise and defeated, he retreated to the river Đại Nha (now in Nam Định Province, northern Vietnam) where he killed himself. Lý Phật Tử then proclaimed himself the Later Lý Nam Đế and went on to rule Vạn Xuân (Vietnam) as an independent state for the next 32 years.

== Fall of Late Lý Nam Đế and the 3rd Chinese domination ==
In 589 AD, the new Sui dynasty emerged as the sole power in a unified China after having defeated the Chen dynasty. In 602 the new emperor Emperor Wen of Sui sent a 120,000-man army to invade Vạn Xuân and re-claim dominion over the Viet people. Lý Phật Tử realized his army would not be strong enough to engage in a major conflict with the Sui invading force. At the same time, he also received enormous pressure from his ruling administration to avoid any confrontation with the emerging Sui Dynasty. In the winter of 602, when the Sui force marched on Vạn Xuân, Lý Phật Tử decided to surrender in exchange for stability in the region.

== Aftermath of Early Lý dynasty ==
The Early Lý dynasty, although defeated, proved that it was capable of independence and self-rule. Through more than 60 years of rebellion and defiance, the national sentiment of the Viet people was awakened. When the northern imperial power began showing signs of weakness and disunity at the end of the Tang dynasty, the Việt people would seize the opportunity to slip from Chinese rule.

Preceded by Triệu Việt Vương	Ruler of Vietnam; 571–602	Succeeded by Third Chinese domination
