= Đạ Tẻh =

Đạ Tẻh Xã Đạ Tẻh
- Commune
- Đạ Tẻh commune
- Location within Vietnam
- Coordinates: 11°30′24″N 107°29′11″E
- Country: Vietnam
- Region: Central Highlands
- Province: Lâm Đồng
- Time zone: UTC+7 (UTC + 7)

Đạ Tẻh is a commune (xã) of Lâm Đồng Province, Vietnam.
