= Mộ Đức district =

Coordinates: 14°57′19″N 108°53′18″E

Mộ Đức district Huyện Mộ Đức
- District
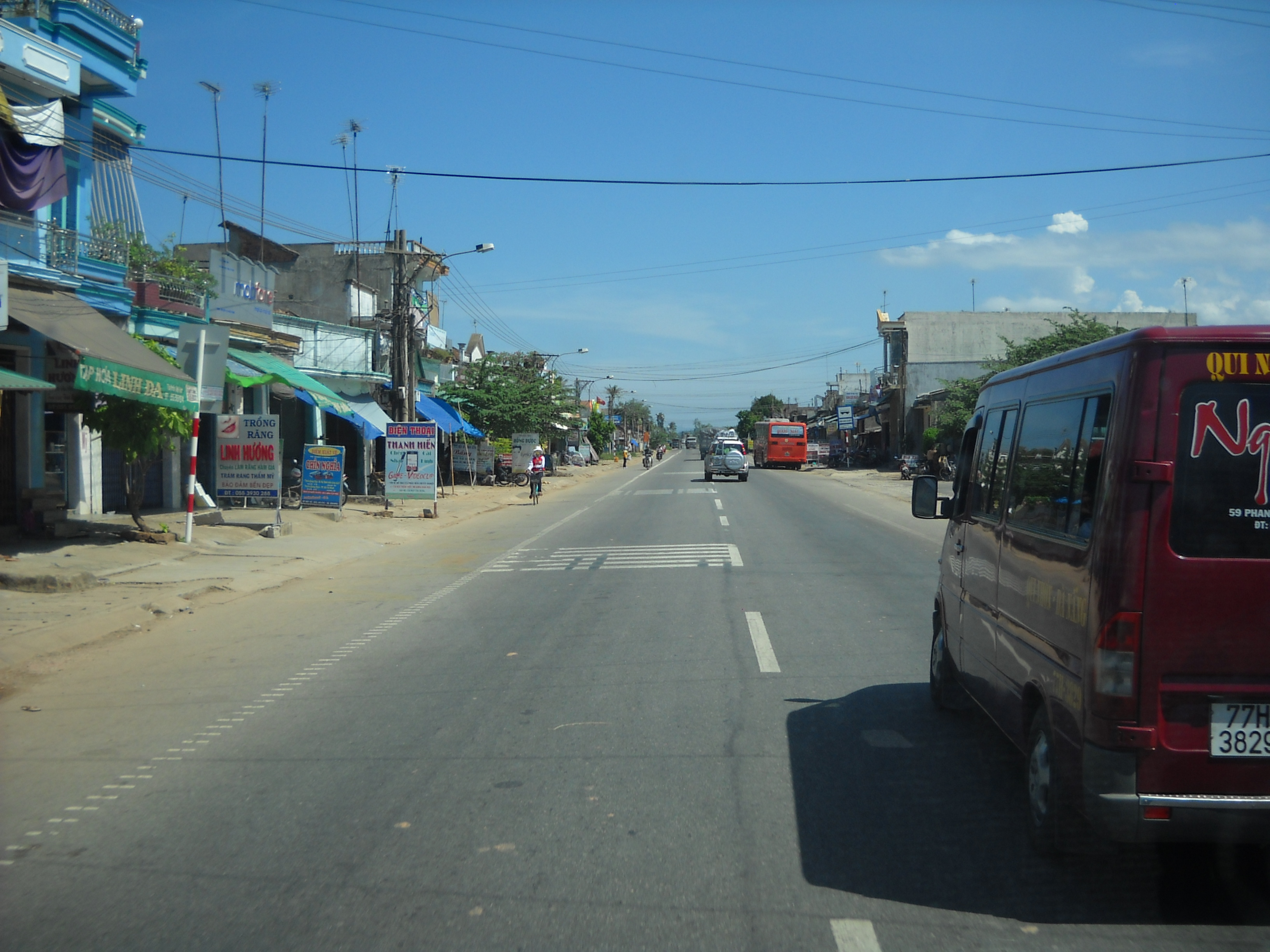
- Street view of Mộ Đức
- Interactive map of Mộ Đức district
- Country: Vietnam
- Region: South Central Coast
- Province: Quảng Ngãi
- Capital: Mộ Đức

Area
  - Total: 82 sq mi (212 km^{2})

Population (2003)
  - Total: 140,133
- Time zone: UTC+7 (UTC + 7)

Mộ Đức is a district (huyện) of Quảng Ngãi province in the South Central Coast region of Vietnam.

As of 2003 the district had a population of 140,133. The district covers an area of 212 km^{2} (82 sq mi). The district capital lies at Mộ Đức. It is served by Mo Duc High School.
