= Tư Nghĩa district =

Coordinates: 15.083°N 108.667°E

Tư Nghĩa district Huyện Tư Nghĩa
- District
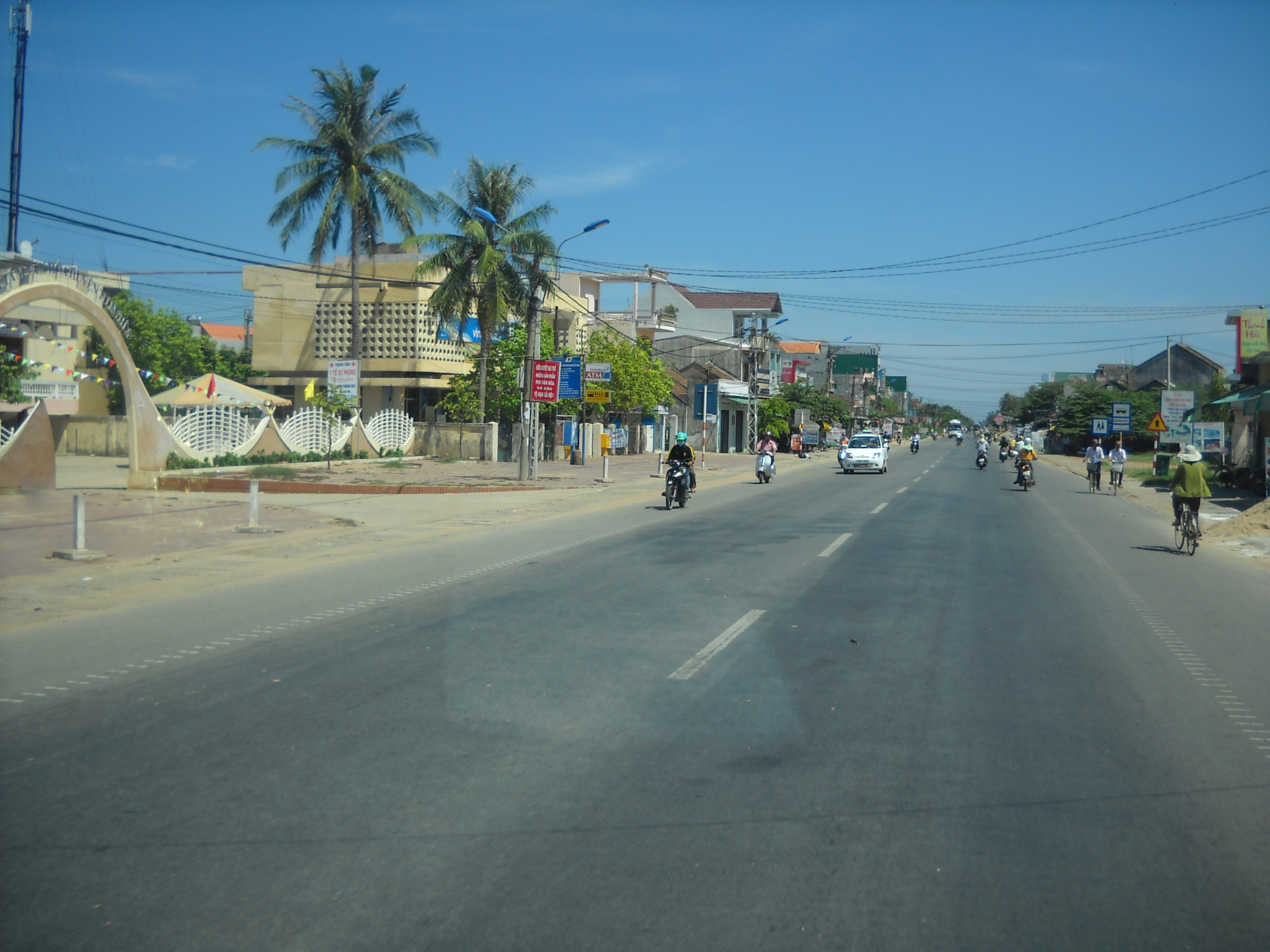
- Street view along La Hà road
- Interactive map of Tư Nghĩa district
- Country: Vietnam
- Region: South Central Coast
- Province: Quảng Ngãi province
- Capital: La Hà

Area
  - Total: 88 sq mi (227 km^{2})

Population (2003)
  - Total: 178,132
- Time zone: UTC+7 (UTC + 7)

Tư Nghĩa is a former rural district (huyện) of Quảng Ngãi province in the South Central Coast region of Vietnam. As of 2003 the district had a population of 178,132. The district covers an area of 227 km^{2}. The district capital lies at La Hà.
