= Nghĩa Trung =

- Commune
- ĐT759 at its junction with National Route 14 in the commune, near the boundary with Phú Trung
- Interactive map of Nghĩa Trung
- Coordinates: 11°38′31″N 107°6′44″E
- Country: Vietnam
- City: Đồng Nai
- Region: Southeast
- Established: 2007
- Seat: Thôn Sao Bọng

Area
  - Total: 222.0 km^{2} (85.7 sq mi)

Population (31 December 2025)
  - Total: 34,514
  - Density: 155/km^{2} (400/sq mi)
- Website: nghiatrung.dongnai.gov.vn

Nghĩa Trung is a commune in Đồng Nai, Vietnam.

On 12 June 2025, the National Assembly of Vietnam adopted Resolution No. 202/2025/QH15 on the reorganization of provincial-level administrative units, which took effect on the same day. Under the resolution, Bình Phước province was merged into Đồng Nai.

On 16 June 2025, the Standing Committee of the National Assembly of Vietnam adopted Resolution No. 1662/NQ-UBTVQH15 on the reorganization of commune-level administrative units in Đồng Nai. Under the resolution, the entire area and population of Đức Liễu, Nghĩa Bình and Nghĩa Trung communes, formerly in Bù Đăng district, Bình Phước province, were consolidated to form a new commune named Nghĩa Trung.
