= Quảng Tín =

- Commune
- Interactive map of Quảng Tín
- Coordinates: 11.935244°N 107.446644°E
- Country: Vietnam
- Region: South Central Coast and Central Highlands
- Province: Lâm Đồng

Area
  - Total: 310.17 km^{2} (119.76 sq mi)

Population (31 December 2024)
  - Total: 34,591
  - Density: 111/km^{2} (290/sq mi)

Quảng Tín is a commune in Lâm Đồng province, Vietnam.

On 16 June 2025, the Standing Committee of the National Assembly of Vietnam issued Resolution No. 1671/NQ-UBTVQH15 on the arrangement of commune-level administrative units in Lâm Đồng province in 2025. Under the resolution, the entire area and population of Đắk Sin, Hưng Bình, Đắk Ru, and Quảng Tín communes, formerly part of Đắk R'lấp district, were merged to form a new commune named Quảng Tín.
