= Lý Thiên Bảo =

Lý Thiên Bảo (traditional Chinese: 李天寶, pinyin: Lǐ Tiānbǎo) (499?-555) was the older brother of Lý Nam Đế, who tried unsuccessfully to resist the forces of China's Liang dynasty.

In 548 Lý Nam Đế had fallen ill while resisting the Liang dynasty forces led by Chen Baxian (founder of the Chen dynasty) in the Northwest Vietnam mountains. Lý Nam Đế decided to relinquish his imperial authority and transferred his power to his older brother Thiên Bảo and trusted lieutenant Triệu Quang Phục as co-rulers in his place with the intention of continuing the struggle against the Han.

In 555, Lý Thiên Bảo fell ill and died without leaving an heir, thus making Triệu Quang Phục as sole ruler. Triệu Quang Phục, better known as the emperor Triệu Việt Vương, was able to consolidate the armed forces under Lý Thiên Bảo and Lý Nam Đế against the Han invasion.

== Bibliography ==
- Phan, John D (2025), Lost Tongues of the Red River: Annamese Middle Chinese and the Origins of the Vietnamese Language, Harvard University Asia Centre
- Churchman, Michael (2010), "Before Chinese and Vietnamese in the Red River Plain", Chinese Southern Diaspora Studies, 4

| Preceded by Lý Nam Đế | Ruler of Vietnam; 548 | Succeeded by Triệu Việt Vương |
