= Bù Đăng, Đồng Nai =

Bù Đăng Xã Bù Đăng
- Commune
- Bù Đăng commune
- Location within Vietnam
- Coordinates: 11°48′46″N 107°14′40″E
- Country: Vietnam
- Region: Southeast
- Municipality: Đồng Nai
- Time zone: UTC+7 (UTC + 7)

Bù Đăng is a commune (xã) of Đồng Nai, Vietnam.
