= Lý Nam Đế =

Emperor of Vạn Xuân from 544 to 548

Lý Nam Đế 李南帝
- Emperor of Vạn Xuân; Emperor of Việt; Emperor of Nam Việt
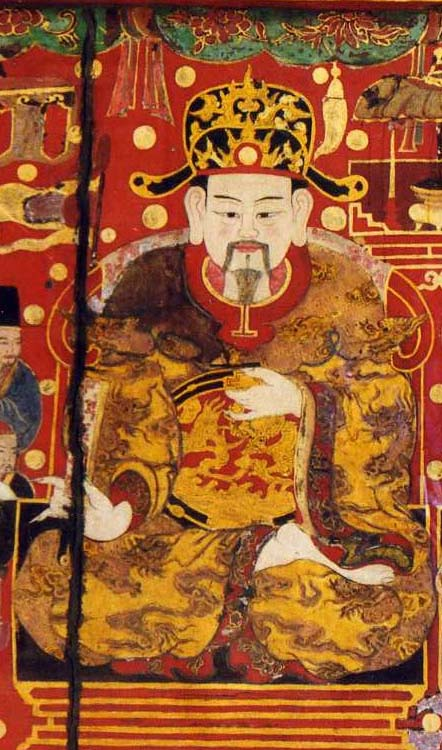
- Lý Nam Đế, Early Lý dynasty lacquerware painting

Emperor of Vạn Xuân
- Reign: 544–548
- Successor: Triệu Việt Vương
- Born: 17 October 503; Phổ Yên, Thái Nguyên, Liang China
- Died: 13 April 548; Tam Nông, Phú Thọ, Vạn Xuân
- Consort: Hứa Trinh Hòa
Names
- Lý Bôn (李賁) (also rendered as Lý Bí)
Era name and dates
- Thiên Đức (天德): 544–548
Posthumous name
- Emperor Nam Việt Hiếu Cao (南越孝高皇帝)
- House: Lý
- Dynasty: Early Lý
- Father: Lý Cạnh
- Mother: Lê Thị Oánh

Lý Nam Đế (chữ Hán: 李南帝, c. 503 – 13 April 548), personal name Lý Bôn or Lý Bí (李賁), was the founding emperor of the Early Lý dynasty of Vietnam, ruling from 544 to 548. He was originally a magistrate of the Chinese Liang dynasty in Jiaozhou.

== Overview ==
According to The Đại Việt sử ký toàn thư, Lý Bôn (李賁, sometimes rendered as Lý Bí) was a local aristocrat whose ancestors were "northerners" (Chinese) who fled Wang Mang's seizure of power during the interregnum between the Western Han and Eastern Han dynasties five centuries earlier. The Book of Qi and Book of Chen both describe Lý Bôn as a rebel leader spawning from the regional governing elite rather than a barbarian or a foreigner. However his relative Phật Tử was described as a Lĭ (俚) barbarian (man), which Michael Churchman attributes to a process of localization and attribution of foreign barbarian traits by Tang writers.

He was a regional magistrate of the Liang dynasty in Jiaozhou (in modern-day northern Vietnam). The Book of Qi and Book of Chen assert that Lý Bôn was part of the localized Sinitic-speaking ruling elite of the Red River Delta who wished to establish his own dynasty. His kinsmen Lý Phật Tử's identity appears to be more ambiguous and was sometimes referred to in Chinese texts as a "Lǐ barbarian of Jiaozhou" (Jiaozhou lǐ rén) and "great leader of Jiaozhou" (Jiaozhou jushuai). Catherine Churchman (2016) suggests that perhaps due to the substantial influences of indigenous preexisting non-Chinese Li Lao drum culture (c. 200–750 AD) that stretched from the Pearl River to the Red River in Southern China and Northern Vietnam, Sinitic immigrants from the north and people with Sinitic ancestry in the areas had gradually accustomed themselves with local culture.

During this time China was experiencing constant civil war. Lý Bí became increasingly frustrated with the corruption in the government and hostility toward the local population. His friend Phạm Tu, subsequently helped him train a small army. Subsequently, Lý Bí resigned his post and revolted in 541 against the Liang dynasty. He gathered the local nobility and tribes within the Red River Valley, gathered together an army and navy, and won a decisive battle in Hepu in summer 543, expelling the Liang from Northern Vietnam region. The following year in February 544, Lý Bí was declared emperor of Nam Việt (Nam Việt Đế, later Lý Nam Đế) by the people with the intention of demonstrating equality in status to China's own emperors. He named the new kingdom "Vạn Xuân" (萬春, literally "Eternal Spring"). His armies also repelled attacks from Champa in the south who had allied with the Liang at the time.

== Further in his life ==
Lý Nam Đế established his capital at Long Biên (modern-day Hanoi), surrounded himself with effective leadership in military and administrative scholars. Lý Nam Đế was also strongly supported by famous military commanders such as Phạm Tu, Triệu Túc, Tinh Thiều, and Triệu Quang Phục, (son of Triệu Tuc, later known as Triệu Việt Vương). The latter emerged as a hero in Vietnamese history and eventually succeeded Lý Nam Đế as ruler in 548. Lý Nam Đế built many fortresses at strategic locations throughout Vạn Xuân to fend off potential threats from Han in the north and from the Champa Kingdom in the south.

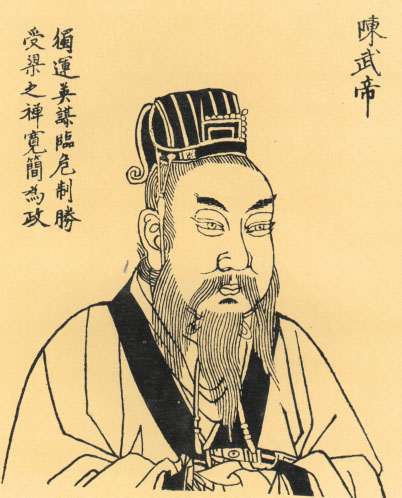
Chen Baxian

However, the new state was not long at peace. In October of 544 the Liang dynasty sent an army to reoccupy Jiaozhou and put down the rebellion, led by general Chen Baxian. By spring of 545, Chen had ravaged much of Jiaozhou. His initial invasion was stalled by Ly Bi's forces for months. However, in the winter of 545, Chen surprised the capital during the monsoon season. Lý Nam Đế's army were caught off guard, and his court was forced to abandon Long Biên and flee westward into the neighboring western highland. The Lý army became exhausted and Lý Bi himself grew increasingly ill due to months of being exposed in the wilderness. Lý Nam Đế realized that his illness would not enable him to rally the troops and accomplish a successful resistance against the imperial Chinese forces. In February 548, he relinquished imperial authority and transferred his power to his older brother Lý Thiên Bảo (co-ruler from 548 until his death in 555) and Triệu Quang Phục (r. 548–571), who was his best lieutenant and general.

By April 548, while suffering from serious disease for months, Lý Nam Đế died somewhere in Northwest Vietnam between the Red and the Black River when local Qiūlǎo (鳩獠) or the Qūlǎo (屈獠) tribesmen assassinated him in hope of warding off the invading Liang army. His immediate successor was Triệu Quang Phục (thereafter known as Triệu Việt Vương, which means Trieu Viet King). The new king continued the resistance and eventually drove the Chinese out from Vạn Xuân in 550. Although China had occupied and would continue to occupy Vietnam for approximately 1,000 years, Lý Nam Đế had successfully established a state that had given Northern Vietnam approximately 60 years of independence.

== Anterior Lý dynasty ==
- Lý Nam Đế I (r. 542–548)
- Lý Thiên Bảo (r. 548–555, co-reigned with Triệu Quang Phục)
- Triệu Việt Vương (r. 548–571, 555–571 as sole ruler)
- Lý Nam Đế II (r. 571–602)

== Bibliography ==
- Churchman, Michael (2010), "Before Chinese and Vietnamese in the Red River Plain", Chinese Southern Diaspora Studies, 4
- Churchman, Catherine (2016). The People Between the Rivers: The Rise and Fall of a Bronze Drum Culture, 200–750 CE. Rowman & Littlefield Publishers. ISBN 978-1-442-25861-7.
- Taylor, Keith Weller (1983). The Birth of the Vietnam. University of California Press. ISBN 978-0-520-07417-0.

Lý Nam Đế Early Lý dynasty Born: October 17, 503 Died: April 13, 548
Preceded by None	Emperor of Nam Việt; 544–548	Succeeded by Triệu Việt Vương
