= Emperor Wu of Chen =

Emperor of Chen from 557 to 559

Emperor Wu of Chen 陳武帝
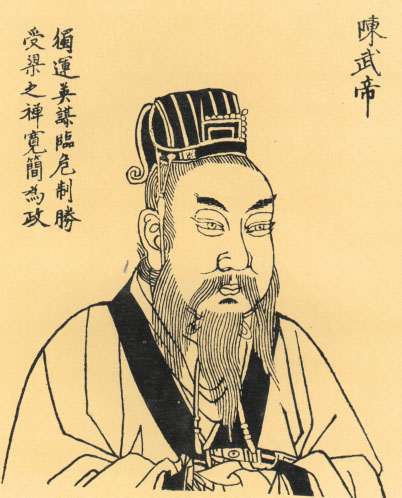

Emperor of the Chen dynasty
- Reign: 16 November 557 – 9 August 559
- Successor: Emperor Wen
- Born: Chen Fasheng (陳法生); 503
- Died: 9 August 559 (aged 55–56)
- Burial: Wan'an Mausoleum (萬安陵, in present-day Jiangning District, Nanjing)
- Consorts: Empress Zhao; Empress Xuan
- Issue: Chen Chang; Princess Yongshi; Princess Kuaijimu; Princess Yuhua
Names
- Family name: Chen (陳); Given name: Baxian (霸先); Courtesy name: Xingguo (興國); Childhood name: Fasheng (法生)
Era name and dates
- Yǒngdìng (永定): 557-559
Posthumous name
- Emperor Wu (武皇帝)
Temple name
- Gaozu (高祖)
- Dynasty: Chen dynasty
- Father: Chen Wenzan
- Mother: Lady Dong

Emperor Wu of Chen (Chinese: 陳武帝; 503– 9 August 559), personal name Chen Baxian (陳霸先), courtesy name Xingguo (興國), childhood name Fasheng (法生), was the founding emperor of the Chen dynasty of China. He first distinguished himself as a Liang dynasty general during the campaign against the rebel general Hou Jing, and he was progressively promoted. In 555, he seized power after a coup against his superior, the general Wang Sengbian, and in 557 he forced Emperor Jing of Liang to abdicate the throne to him, thereby establishing the Chen dynasty. He died in 559, and as his only surviving son Chen Chang was held by the Northern Zhou dynasty, he was succeeded by his nephew Chen Qian (Emperor Wen).

== Background and early career ==
Chen Baxian was born to Chen Wenzan (陳文讚) and Lady Dong in 503, the second year of the reign of Emperor Wu of Liang (the founding emperor of Liang dynasty). He was from Wuxing Commandery (吳興, roughly modern Huzhou, Zhejiang). His family traced its ancestry to Chen Shi (陳寔), a county magistrate and Confucian scholar during the Han dynasty, and Chen Shi's great-great-grandson Chen Zhun (陈准; died c.late 300), who was Grand Commandant during the reign of Emperor Hui of Jin. During the lineage that was traced, Chen's ancestors generally served as officials, although several were important figures in imperial governments of the Jin dynasty and the subsequent Southern dynasties, including Chen Baxian's grandfather Chen Daoju (陳道巨).

When Chen Baxian was young, he was considered ambitious, not caring about managing properties. As he grew older, he studied military strategies and learned various fighting techniques. Initially, he married a daughter of Qian Zhongfang (錢仲方), who was also from Wuxing Commandery, but she died early. After Lady Qian's death, he married Zhang Yao'er, likewise from Wuxing Commandery. They had at least one son, Chen Chang. It is known that he had five sons before Chen Chang, but all, including Chen Ke (陳克), the only one whose name is preserved in history, appeared to have died early; it is not known who their mothers were.

In the late 530s, when Xiao Ying (蕭映) the Marquess of Xinyu, a nephew of Emperor Wu, was the governor of Wuxing Commandery, he had the chance to see Chen Baxian and was impressed by him. When Xiao Ying was made the governor of Guang Province (廣州, modern Guangdong) around 540, he invited Chen to serve on his staff, and subsequently, Xiao Ying made him an acting commandery governor.

== War with Vạn Xuân ==
In 541, the people of Giao Châu Province (in modern northern Vietnam), dissatisfied with the cruel rule of Xiao Zi (蕭諮) the Marquess of Wulin (another nephew of Emperor Wu), rebelled under the leadership of Lý Bôn. Xiao Ying sent the generals Sun Jiong (孫冏) and Lu Zixiong (盧子雄) to attack Lý Bôn, with Xiao Ying overseeing the operations. In spring 542, Xiao Ying and Xiao Zi ordered Sun and Lu to attack, despite Sun and Lu's request to delay the attack to fall 542 due to fears that hot temperature could cause illnesses. When Lý Bôn crushed their forces with heavy casualties, Xiao Zi falsely accused Sun and Lu of working in concert with Lý Bôn, and Emperor Wu ordered Sun and Lu to commit suicide. Lu Zixiong's brothers Lu Zilüe (盧子略) and Lu Zilie (盧子烈) and subordinates, the brothers Du Tianhe (杜天合) and Du Sengming and Zhou Wenyu, attacked the capital of Guang Province, wanting to kill Xiao Zi and Xiao Ying to avenge Lu Zixiong. Xiao Ying ordered Chen to engage them, and he defeated them, killing Du Tianhe and capturing Du Sengming and Zhou. Believing that Du Sengming and Zhou were both good soldiers, he released them and retained them on his staff. For this accomplishment, Emperor Wu created Chen the Viscount of Xin'an, and while he did not summon Chen to the capital Jiankang, he had an artisan draw a portrait of Chen and deliver it to him.

In January 544, Lý Bôn proclaimed himself emperor and named the country Vạn Xuân, ending the Second Chinese domination of Vietnam. In winter 544, Xiao Ying died, and initially, Chen started escorting Xiao Ying's casket back to Jiankang for burial. On the way, while he was still at Dayu Mountain (大庾嶺, on the borders of modern Jiangxi and Guangdong), he was ordered to rendezvous with the new governor of Giao Châu Province, Yang Piao (楊瞟), and another nephew of Emperor Wu's, Xiao Bo (蕭勃), to attack Lý Bôn. Xiao Bao did not want to set out on the campaign, and therefore tried to persuade Yang not to advance. Chen persuaded Yang otherwise, and in spring 545, Yang, with Chen as his lieutenant, attacked Lý Bôn, defeating him and forcing him to flee into the mountains and conduct guerilla warfare instead. In 548, Lý Bôn's subordinates killed Lý Bôn, and when Lý Bôn's brother Lý Thiên Bảo succeeded him and attacked Ai Province (愛州, centered on modern Thanh Hóa Province, Vietnam), Chen defeated Lý Thiên Bảo. Emperor Wu made Chen the governor of Gaoyao Commandery (高要, roughly modern Zhaoqing, Guangdong) as well as the commander of the forces of the surrounding commanderies.

== During the Hou Jing Disturbance ==
In summer 548, Hou Jing, formerly a general of Eastern Wei (a branch successor state of Northern Wei) whose defection Emperor Wu had accepted, rebelled, and in 549 captured Jiankang, taking Emperor Wu and his son and crown prince Xiao Gang hostage. After Jiankang's fall, Hou, who had initially claimed that he wanted to restore Northern Wei's imperial clan to power, from the control of the regent Gao Cheng, enticed the governor of Guang Province, Yuan Jingzhong (元景仲), a member of Northern Wei's imperial Yuan clan, to join him, and when Chen received the news, he publicly announced Yuan's treachery and gathered the troops of the nearby generals to attack Yuan. Yuan committed suicide, and Chen welcomed Xiao Bo, then the governor of Ding Province (定州, roughly modern Guigang, Guangxi) to take over Guang Province. In winter 549, against Xiao Bo's request, Chen took his troops and embarked on a campaign to join the fight against Hou, sending messengers to Emperor Wu's son Xiao Yi the Prince of Xiangdong, the governor of Jing Province (荊州, modern central and western Hubei), pledging support and loyalty to Xiao Yi, then commonly viewed as the leader of the remaining Liang provinces not under Hou's control.

For the next year, Chen advanced north through modern Jiangxi, fighting the various local warlords and generals loyal to Hou, with his main struggle against Li Qianshi (李遷仕). In spring 551, he captured and killed Li. Xiao Yi made him the governor of Jiang Province (江州, roughly modern Jiangxi). By fall 551, he had rendezvoused with Xiao Yi's main general, Wang Sengbian, at Xunyang (尋陽, in modern Jiujiang, Jiangxi). In 552, after they had sworn a solemn oath to Liang, they advanced east toward Jiankang, where Hou had killed Xiao Gang (who had succeeded Emperor Wu as Emperor Jianwen) and taken the throne himself as Emperor of Han. Chen was instrumental in the subsequent siege of Jiankang, and they defeated Hou together, causing Hou to flee. Subsequently, Hou was killed by his own men. For Chen's contributions, Xiao Yi created Chen the Marquess of Changcheng—Chen's home county. Wang put Chen in charge of the important city Jingkou (京口, in modern Zhenjiang, Jiangsu). For the next two years, Chen was several times involved in border battles against Northern Qi (Eastern Wei's successor state). At times, when Xiao Yi (who had by now taken the throne as Emperor Yuan but set up his capital at his headquarters of Jiangling rather than at Jiankang) summoned Wang on campaigns, Wang would put Chen in charge of Jiankang.

== Seizure of power ==
In 554, Western Wei launched a major attack on Jiangling, and Emperor Yuan summoned Wang to come to his aid, putting Chen in charge of Jiankang. Before Wang could reach Jiangling, however, Western Wei had already captured Jiangling, killing Emperor Yuan and declaring his nephew Xiao Cha emperor instead (as Emperor Xuan). (Xiao Cha's state is known in history as the Western Liang.) Wang and Chen refused to recognize Emperor Xuan; instead, in spring 555, they welcomed Emperor Yuan's 11-year-old son Xiao Fangzhi the Prince of Jin'an—Emperor Yuan's only surviving son—to Jiankang, preparing to make him emperor and first having him take the title Prince of Liang. (When Jiankang fell, Chen's son Chen Chang and nephew Chen Xu, who had been serving in the imperial administration, were captured and taken to the Western Wei capital Chang'an as honored captives.)

At this time, however, Emperor Wenxuan of Northern Qi had other ideas, and he sent his brother Gao Huan (高渙) the Prince of Shangdang to command an army to escort Emperor Yuan's cousin Xiao Yuanming the Marquess of Zhenyang—whom Eastern Wei had taken captive in 547—back to Liang to be emperor. Wang initially rejected Xiao Yuanming, but after his forces lost a few battles to Northern Qi forces, changed his mind and decided to accept Xiao Yuanming as emperor after extracting a promise from Xiao Yuanming to make Xiao Fangzhi crown prince. In summer 555, Xiao Yuanming arrived at Jiankang to take the throne, and he created Xiao Fangzhi crown prince. Wang and Chen continued to be in charge of the military.

Chen, however, was unhappy about the situation, believing Xiao Yuanming to be unworthy of the throne. Despite Wang Sengbian's knowledge of Chen's displeasure, however, Wang did not suspect Chen of having any rebellious intentions, as they had been friendly, and Wang and Chen had agreed on having Wang Sengbian's son Wang Wei (王頠) marry Chen's daughter, although the marriage had not been established on account of the recent death of Wang Sengbian's mother. In fall 555, believing reports that Northern Qi was going to attack, Wang sent his secretary Jiang Gan (江旰) to Jingkou to alert Chen. Chen instead detained Jiang and started a surprise attack on Wang. With Wang not suspecting that an attack would occur, Chen quickly reached Wang's headquarters at Shitou (a fortress near Jiankang), capturing and killing Wang Sengbian and Wang Wei. He took over control of the imperial government, forcing Xiao Yuanming to abdicate and making Xiao Fangzhi emperor (as Emperor Jing).

Immediately, Chen faced resistance from the generals Xu Sihui (徐嗣徽), Ren Yue (任約), and Hou Tian, and Wang Sengbian's brother Wang Sengzhi (王僧智) and son-in-law Du Kan (杜龕). (Du was the governor of Chen's home commandery of Wuxing, and the historian Bo Yang had speculated that Du's disrespect for Chen and his curbing of special privileges that Chen's clan was exerting in Wuxing might have been an impetus for Chen's rebellion against Wang.) Chen initially sent his nephew Chen Qian and his general Zhou Wenyu against Du and Du's ally Wei Zai (韋載), but the campaign was inconclusive, and Chen subsequently went to attack himself. Meanwhile, Xu and Ren, aided by Northern Qi, made a surprise attack on Jiankang, nearly capturing it, but were repelled by Chen's general Hou Andu. Soon, Chen defeated Wei and Wei surrendered, and Chen returned to Jiankang, leaving Zhou to face Du.

Despite Northern Qi aid, Xu and Ren could not defeat Chen, and Chen put Shitou, which the Northern Qi general Liu Damo (柳達摩) had captured, under siege. Liu sought peace, but requested Chen to send his relatives as hostages to Northern Qi. Most officials advocated peace, and Chen, despite his skepticism about such a peace holding, agreed, and sent his nephew Chen Tanlang (陳曇朗), Emperor Yuan's grandson Xiao Zhuang the Prince of Yongjia, and Wang Min (王珉), the son of the key official Wang Chong (王沖), as hostages, permitting Northern Qi forces to withdraw, and Xu and Ren withdrew with them.

By spring 556, Du had either been captured or surrendered to Zhou and Chen Qian, and Chen Baxian executed Du. Wang Sengzhi fled to Northern Qi, and the capital region was largely under Chen Baxian's control. Meanwhile, Northern Qi forces were preparing another attack, but they invited Xiao Yuanming to their camp to discuss peace. Chen sent Xiao Yuanming to Northern Qi camp, but before talks could begin, Xiao Yuanming died from a severe infection on his back. By summer 556, Northern Qi forces were again descending on Jiankang, but once there, their forces stalemated with Chen's forces. Northern Qi forces' food supplies soon ran out, and Chen defeated them, killing Xu and capturing a number of Northern Qi generals, whom Chen executed. (In response, Northern Qi executed Chen Tanlang, although Chen Baxian never found out during his lifetime.) Meanwhile, Hou Tian, having been defeated by another general, Hou Ping (侯平), chose to submit to Chen.

During the next year, Chen began to receive greater and greater titles and offices, progressing from being the Marquess of Changcheng to Duke of Changcheng to Duke of Yixing to Duke of Chen to Prince of Chen. In 557, Xiao Bo declared a resistance against Chen from Guang Province. Soon, however, Zhou defeated Xiao Bo's general Ouyang Wei (歐陽頠), and Xiao Bo was killed by his own generals. At the same time, Wang Lin, who controlled modern Hunan and eastern Hubei, suspicious of Chen's intentions, refused his summon to Jiankang and prepared for battle instead. Chen sent Zhou and Hou Andu against Wang Lin. In winter 557, Chen had Emperor Jing yield the throne to him, establishing Chen dynasty as its Emperor Wu. He created Emperor Jing the Prince of Jiangyin. He posthumously honored his parents emperor and empress, his deceased wife Lady Qian empress, and his deceased son Chen Ke crown prince. He created his wife Zhang Yao'er empress.

== Reign ==
While it is not known when Emperor Wu became a Buddhist, once he became emperor he immediately took steps to officially sanction Buddhism, as he displayed a relic believed to be a Buddha's tooth and held a major Buddhist festival. He also, following the lead of Liang's Emperor Wu, offered himself to Buddha's service on one occasion. He made several requests to Western Wei's successor state Northern Zhou to return Chen Chang and Chen Xu, and while Northern Zhou promised to do so, they would actually not be returned in Emperor Wu's lifetime.

Meanwhile, news that Emperor Wu had accepted the throne had reached the front where Zhou Wenyu and Hou Andu were engaging Wang Lin, greatly depressing Zhou and Hou's forces, as this removed a major appeal that they had—that Wang was being a rebel for refusing to follow Emperor Jing's orders. Wang defeated Zhou and Hou and captured them. After doing so, however, both Chen forces and Wang Lin's forces were stalemated by the fact that the general Lu Xida (魯悉達), who controlled Northern Jiang Province (北江州, roughly modern Anqing, Anhui), was accepting overtures from both sides but refusing to actually obey either side. Not able to make progress in his campaign against the new Chen state, Wang sought help from Northern Qi and requested that it return Xiao Zhuang to be emperor. Soon, Northern Qi returned Xiao Zhuang, and Wang Lin declared Xiao Zhuang emperor at Ying Province (郢州, modern eastern Hubei).

In summer 558, Emperor Wu had the former Emperor Jing of Liang killed. He sent Hou Tian and Xu Du (徐度) to attack Wang Lin, but soon negotiated a peace with Wang Lin, after Wang's general Yu Xiaoqing (余孝頃) was defeated by the independent general Zhou Di (周迪), satrap of Linchuan (Jiangxi). (Meanwhile, Zhou Wenyu and Hou escaped from Wang's custody and returned to Chen, although Zhou was soon assassinated by the independent general Xiong Tanlang (熊曇朗), on 19 July 559.)

In summer 559, Emperor Wu suffered a major illness and died suddenly. At that time, the only close relative of his in Chen territory, his nephew Chen Qian the Prince of Linchuan, was away building a fort at Nanhuan (南皖, in modern Anqing, Anhui). Empress Zhang, after consulting the officials Du Leng (杜稜) and Cai Jingli (蔡景歷), chose not to announce Emperor Wu's death and summoned Chen Qian back from Nanhuan. The imperial officials decided to support Chen Qian as emperor, and while Empress Zhang was initially hesitant, hoping that Chen Chang would return, she eventually agreed, and Chen Qian took the throne as Emperor Wen.

== Family ==
- Empress Zhao, of the Qian clan (昭皇后 錢氏)
  - Chen Ke, Crown Prince Xiaohuai (孝懷皇太子 陳克)
- Empress Xuan, of the Zhang clan (宣皇后 章氏; 506–570), personal name Yao'er (要兒)
  - Chen Chang, Prince Xian Hengyang (衡陽獻王 陳昌; 537–560), sixth son
  - Princess Yuhua (玉華公主)
- Unknown
  - Chen Li, Prince Xian of Yuzhang (豫章獻王 陳立)
  - Chen Quan, Prince Si of Changsha (長沙思王 陳權)
  - Princess Yongshi (永世公主), first daughter
    - Married Qian Chan (錢蕆), and had issue (one son)
  - Princess Mu of Kuaiji (會稽穆公主)
    - Married Shen Junli of Wuxing, Marquis Wangcai (吳興 沈君理; 525–573), and had issue (Lady Shen Wuhua)

== Reading ==
- Book of Chen, vols. 1, 2.
- History of Southern Dynasties, vol. 9.
- Zizhi Tongjian, vols. 158, 159, 161, 162, 163, 164, 165, 166, 167.

Chinese royalty
New dynasty	Emperor of the Chen dynasty 557–559	Succeeded by Emperor Wen of Chen
Preceded by Emperor Jing of Liang	Emperor of China (Southeastern); 557–559	Succeeded by Emperor Wen of Chen
