= 562 =

Calendar year

562 in various calendars
- Gregorian calendar: 562; DLXII
- Ab urbe condita: 1315
- Armenian calendar: 11; ԹՎ ԺԱ
- Assyrian calendar: 5312
- Balinese saka calendar: 483–484
- Bengali calendar: −32 – −31
- Berber calendar: 1512
- Buddhist calendar: 1106
- Burmese calendar: −76
- Byzantine calendar: 6070–6071
- Chinese calendar: 辛巳年 (Metal Snake); 3259 or 3052 — to — 壬午年 (Water Horse); 3260 or 3053
- Coptic calendar: 278–279
- Discordian calendar: 1728
- Ethiopian calendar: 554–555
- Hebrew calendar: 4322–4323
- Hindu calendars
- Vikram Samvat: 618–619
- Shaka Samvat: 483–484
- Kali Yuga: 3662–3663
- Holocene calendar: 10562
- Iranian calendar: 60 BP – 59 BP
- Islamic calendar: 62 BH – 61 BH
- Javanese calendar: 450–451
- Julian calendar: 562; DLXII
- Korean calendar: 2895
- Minguo calendar: 1350 before ROC 民前1350年
- Nanakshahi calendar: −906
- Seleucid era: 873/874 AG
- Thai solar calendar: 1104–1105
- Tibetan calendar: ལྕགས་མོ་སྦྲུལ་ལོ་ (female Iron-Snake); 688 or 307 or −465 — to — ཆུ་ཕོ་རྟ་ལོ་ (male Water-Horse); 689 or 308 or −464

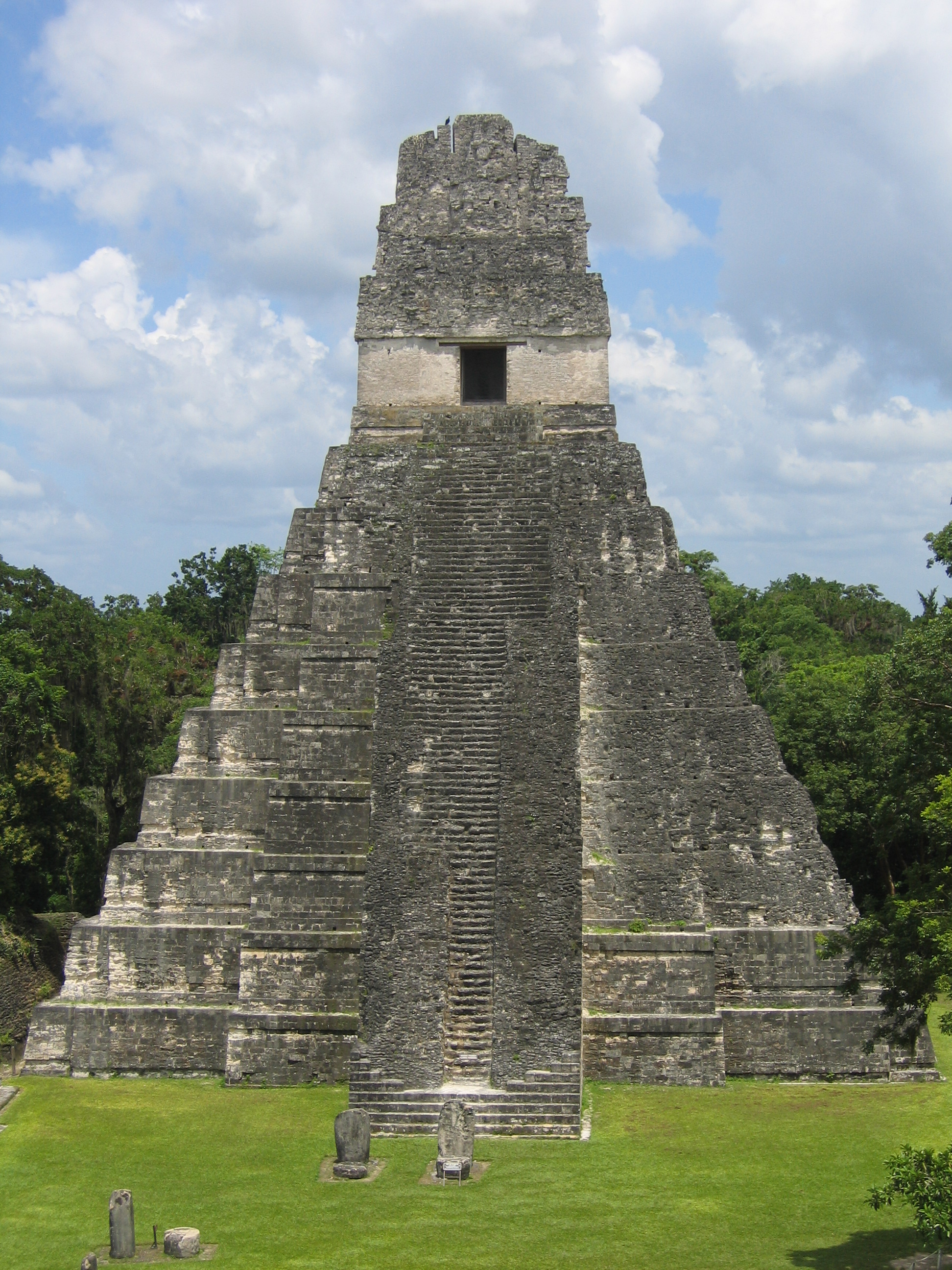
Tikal Temple from the main plaza (Guatemala)

Year 562 (DLXII) was a common year starting on Sunday of the Julian calendar. The denomination 562 for this year has been used since the early medieval period, when the Anno Domini calendar era became the prevalent method in Europe for naming years.

== Events ==
=== By place ===
==== Byzantine Empire ====
- Emperor Justinian I signs a peace treaty with the Sasanid Empire. The status quo ante is restored, with Lazica (modern Georgia) in Byzantine hands.
- Belisarius stands trial for corruption in Constantinople, possibly with Procopius acting as praefectus urbi. He is found guilty and sent to prison.
- End of the Lazic War: In the Fifty-Year Peace Treaty, King Khosrau I recognises Lazica as a Byzantine vassal state for an annual payment of 5,000 pounds of gold each year.
- December 23 – Justinian I re-consecrates Hagia Sophia after its dome is rebuilt. Paul the Silentiary, Byzantine poet, writes an epic poem (Ekphrasis).
- The last Ostrogothic strongholds at Verona and Brixia are taken by the Byzantine Empire, ending the Gothic War.

==== Europe ====
- King Sigebert I repels an attack on Austrasia by the Avars at Regensburg (Germany). He moves his capital from Reims to Metz (approximate date).

==== Asia ====
- Spring – Xiao Ming Di, age 20, succeeds his father Xuan Di as emperor of the Chinese Liang Dynasty.
- Silla, by order of king Jinheung, wages war upon Gaya (Three Kingdoms of Korea) and conquers it.
- The secondary capital Taiyuan in Northern Qi is rebuilt and becomes a center of Buddhism.

==== Mesoamerica ====
- First Tikal-Calakmul War: The Maya state of Caracol (Belize) defeats King Wak Chan K'awiil (Double Bird) of Tikal in battle, ending his dynasty.

== Deaths ==
- Dowager Cao, concubine of Xuan Di
- Dowager Gong, empress mother of Xuan Di
- Procopius, Byzantine historian (approximate date)
- Xuan Di, emperor of the Liang Dynasty (b. 519)
