= House of Xiao =

House of Xiao may refer to the ruling houses of these successive dynasties:

- Southern Qi (479–502)
- Liang dynasty (502–557)
- Western Liang (555–587)
