= Empress Dowager Wang =

Empress Dowager Wang (王太后) may refer to:

- Empress Wang Zhi (王娡) (died 126 BC), empress dowager of the Han dynasty, Emperor Wu's mother
- Empress Wang (Xuan) (died 16 BC), empress dowager of the Han dynasty, Emperor Yuan's stepmother
- Wang Zhengjun (王政君) (71 BC – AD 13), empress dowager of the Han dynasty, Emperor Cheng's mother
- Empress Wang (Ping) (8 BC – AD 23), empress dowager of the Han dynasty
- Wang Yuanji (王元姬) (217–268), empress dowager of the Jin dynasty
- Wang Xianyuan (王憲嫄) (427–464), empress dowager of the Liu Song dynasty, Emperor Qianfei's mother
- Wang Zhenfeng (王貞風) (436–479), empress dowager of the Liu Song dynasty, Emperor Houfei's stepmother
- Wang Baoming (王寶明) (455–512), empress dowager of Southern Qi
- Empress Dowager Wang (Xiao Dong) (fl. 551), empress dowager of the Liang dynasty, Xiao Dong's mother
- Empress Wang (Xiao Cha) (died 563), empress dowager of the Liang dynasty, Xiao Kui's stepmother
- Empress Dowager Wang (Xianzong) (763–816), empress dowager of the Tang dynasty, Emperor Xianzong's mother
- Empress Dowager Wang (Jingzong) (died 845), empress dowager of the Tang dynasty, Emperor Jingzong's mother
- Empress Dowager Wang (Rui) (died 928), empress dowager of the Wu state
- Empress Dowager Wang (Southern Ming) (c. 1594?–1651), empress dowager of the Southern Ming dynasty

== See also ==
- Empress Wang (disambiguation)
