= Empress Gong =

Empress Gong may refer to:

- Wang Zhenfeng (436–479), formally Empress Gong, empress of the Liu Song dynasty
- Empress Dowager Gong (died 562), empress dowager of the Western Liang dynasty
- Empress Gong (Northern Wei) (died 452), princess consort and posthumous empress of the Northern Wei dynasty
