= Empress Zhang (Liang dynasty) =

Empress of Liang in 551

Empress Zhang (張皇后, personal name unknown) was briefly an empress of the Chinese Liang Dynasty.

She was the wife of Xiao Dong the Prince of Yuzhang, a great-grandson of the founder of the dynasty Emperor Wu, and she therefore was known as the Princess of Yuzhang. In 551, the general Hou Jing, who controlled the imperial government at Jiankang, in order to show off his power, deposed Xiao Dong's granduncle Emperor Jianwen and made Xiao Dong emperor. By that time, Xiao Dong and Princess Zhang had long been under house arrest after Hou's capturing of Jiankang in 549, and when the imperial procession arrived to escort Xiao Dong, he and Princess Zhang were tending their garden to grow vegetables to supplement their diet (as the region had been suffering from a war-induced famine ever since Hou's rebellion and takeover of Jiankang). After Xiao Dong was made emperor, he created her empress. Two and a half months later, however, Hou forced him to yield the throne to Hou, who took the throne as Emperor of Han. Nothing further is known about Empress Zhang, including whether she survived her husband's killing by the general Zhu Maichen (朱買臣) in May 552.

Chinese royalty
Preceded by None (dynasty founded)	Empress of Liang Dynasty (Eastern/Southern); 551	Succeeded by Empress Wang (Jing)
Preceded by Empress Wang of Southern Qi	Empress of China (Southeastern); 551	Succeeded by Empress Wang (Jing)
Preceded by Empress Wang of Southern Qi	Empress of China (Southwestern); 551	Succeeded by Empress Yuwen of Western Wei
Preceded by Empress Wang of Southern Qi	Empress of China (Hubei/Hunan); 551	Succeeded by Empress Wang (Xuan)
Preceded by None (dynasty founded)	Empress of Liang Dynasty (Western); 551	Succeeded by Empress Wang (Xuan)
