= Consort Cao =

Consort Cao may refer to:

- Cao Jie (empress) (died 260), wife of Emperor Xian of Han
- Consort Dowager Cao (died 562), concubine of Xiao Cha (Emperor Xuan of Western Liang)
- Empress Cao (Dou Jiande's wife) (fl. 621)
- Empress Cao (Huang Chao's wife) (died 884)
- Empress Dowager Cao (Li Cunxu's mother) (died 925), concubine of Li Keyong
- Empress Cao (Li Siyuan's wife) (died 937), empress of Later Tang
- Empress Cao (Song dynasty) (1016–1079), wife of Emperor Renzong of Song
- Consort Duan (died 1542), concubine of the Jiajing Emperor
