= Consort Wan =

Consort Wan may refer to:

== Imperial consorts with the surname Wan ==
- Wan Zhen'er (1428–1487), concubine of the Chenghua Emperor
- Consort Chen (Yingzong) (1431–1467), concubine of Emperor Yingzong of Ming

== Imperial consorts with the title Consort Wan ==
- Dowager Noble Consort Wan (1717–1807), concubine of the Qianlong Emperor
- Noble Consort Wan (Xianfeng) (1835–1894), concubine of the Xianfeng Emperor

== See also ==
- Consort Wang (disambiguation)
