= Empress Wang =

Empress Wang may refer to:

- Wang Zhi (empress) (王娡) (died 126 BC), empress of the Han dynasty, married to Emperor Jing
- Empress Wang (Xuan) (王皇后, given name unknown) (died 16 BC), empress of the Han dynasty, married to Emperor Xuan
- Wang Zhengjun (王政君) (71 BC–AD 13), empress of the Han dynasty, married to Emperor Yuan
- Empress Wang (Ping) (王皇后, given name unknown) (8 BC–AD 23), empress of the Han dynasty, married to Emperor Ping
- Empress Wang (Xin dynasty) (王皇后, given name unknown) (died 21), empress of the Xin dynasty
- Empress Wang (Cao Fang) (王皇后, given name unknown) (fl. 254), empress of the Cao Wei state
- Wang Muzhi (王穆之) (died 365), empress of the Jin dynasty, married to Emperor Ai
- Wang Fahui (王法慧) (360–380), empress of the Jin dynasty, married to Emperor Xiaowu
- Wang Shen'ai (王神愛) (384–412), empress of the Jin dynasty, married to Emperor An
- Wang Xianyuan (王憲嫄) (427–464), empress of the Liu Song dynasty, married to Emperor Xiaowu
- Wang Zhenfeng (王貞風) (436–479), empress of the Liu Song dynasty, married to Emperor Ming
- Wang Shaoming (王韶明) (fl. 490–494), empress of Southern Qi, married to Xiao Zhaowen
- Wang Shunhua (王蕣華) (fl. 499–502), empress of Southern Qi, married to Xiao Baorong
- Empress Wang (Jing) (王皇后, given name unknown) (fl. 552–557), empress of the Liang dynasty, married to Xiao Fangzhi
- Empress Wang (Xiao Cha) (王皇后, given name unknown) (died 563), empress of the Liang dynasty, married to Xiao Cha
- Wang Shaoji (王少姬) (fl. 560–583), empress of the Chen dynasty
- Empress Wang (Gaozong) (王皇后, given name unknown) (died 655), empress of the Tang dynasty, married to Emperor Gaozong
- Empress Wang (Xuanzong) (王皇后, given name unknown) (died 724), empress of the Tang dynasty, married to Emperor Xuanzong
- Empress Wang (Dezong) (王皇后, given name unknown) (died 786), empress of the Tang dynasty, married to Emperor Dezong
- Empress Wang (Yang Pu) (王皇后, given name unknown) (fl. 933–937), empress of the Wu state
- Empress Wang (Taizu) (王皇后, given name unknown) (942–963), empress of the Song dynasty, married to Emperor Taizu
- Empress Wang (Huizong) (王皇后, given name unknown) (1084–1108), empress of the Song dynasty, married to Emperor Huizong
- Empress Wang (Western Xia) (罔皇后, given name unknown) (died 1167/1168), empress of the Western Xia dynasty
- Empress Rensheng (仁聖皇后, given name unknown) (fl. 1213–1233), empress of the Jurchen Jin dynasty
- Empress Wang (Jingtai) (汪皇后, given name unknown) (died 1505), empress of the Ming dynasty, married to Jingtai Emperor
- Empress Wang (Chenghua) (王皇后, given name unknown) (died 1518), empress of the Ming dynasty, married to Chenghua Emperor
- Empress Wang (Southern Ming) (王皇后, given name unknown) (died 1662), empress of Southern Ming

== See also ==
- Empress Dowager Wang (disambiguation)
