= Empress Dowager Wang (Xiao Dong) =

Empress Dowager Wang (王太后, personal name unknown) was briefly an empress dowager of the Chinese dynasty Liang Dynasty. She was the wife of Xiao Huan (蕭歡), Prince An of Yuzhang, a grandson of the dynasty's founder Emperor Wu through his first crown prince, Xiao Tong. Her son Xiao Dong the Prince of Yuzhang was made the emperor in 551 by the general Hou Jing, who had taken over the imperial government, to replace his granduncle Emperor Jianwen. Xiao Dong honored her as empress dowager. Two and a half months later, Hou forced him to yield the throne to Hou, who declared himself the Emperor of Han.
