= Houzhu =

Houzhu may refer to:

- Emperor Houzhu of Han (207–271), Liu Shan, last emperor of the Chinese state of Shu Han
- Emperor Houzhu of Northern Qi (557–577), Gao Wei, emperor of the Chinese dynasty Northern Qi
- Emperor Houzhu of Western Liang, Xiao Cong, emperor of the Chinese Liang dynasty from 585 to 587
- Houzhu of Later Shu (919–965), Meng Chang, Emperor of Chinese state Later Shu
- Li Houzhu (937–978), Li Yu, last ruler of the Chinese state Southern Tang
- Emperor Houzhu of Southern Han (942–980), Liu Chang, last King of the Chinese kingdom Southern Han
