= Xiao Zhuang =

Chinese Liang dynasty Prince of Yongjia

Yongjia Wang (永嘉王)
Family name:	Xiao (蕭, xiāo)
Given name:	Zhuang (莊, zhuāng)
Posthumous name:	None

Xiao Zhuang (蕭莊; 548–577?), often known by his princely title of Prince of Yongjia (永嘉王), was a grandson of Emperor Yuan of Liang, who was declared by the general Wang Lin to be the legitimate emperor of the Liang dynasty in 558, under military assistance by Northern Qi. He thus was one of the three claimants to the Southern dynasties throne, competing with Emperor Xuan of Western Liang, who was supported by Northern Zhou, and the Chen dynasty's founder Emperor Wu of Chen and later his nephew Emperor Wen of Chen. In 560, with Wang Lin defeated by Chen troops, both Wang and Xiao Zhuang fled to Northern Qi, ending their rivalry with Chen and the Western Liang. While Northern Qi emperors made promises to return Xiao Zhuang to the Liang throne, Northern Qi was never able to accomplish that promise, and Xiao Zhuang died shortly after Northern Qi's own destruction in 577.

== Early life ==
Xiao Zhuang was born in 548, as the son of Xiao Fangdeng (蕭方等), the oldest son and heir apparent of Xiao Yi the Prince of Xiangdong, and Lady Xu Zhaopei. The name of his mother is not known to history. At the time of Xiao Zhuang's birth, his great-grandfather Emperor Wu was under siege by the rebel general Hou Jing inside the capital Jiankang, and Xiao Yi had sent Xiao Fangdeng to Jiankang as part of the confluence of provincial troops trying to lift the siege on Jiankang. Xiao Fangdeng distinguished himself during the campaign, but eventually Hou captured Jiankang in 549, taking Emperor Wu and Xiao Yi's older brother Xiao Gang the Crown Prince hostage. After Jiankang's fall, the provincial troops disbanded, and Xiao Fangdeng took his troops back to Xiao Yi's headquarters at Jiangling. Later that year, Xiao Fangdeng died while battling his cousin Xiao Yu (蕭譽) the Prince of Hedong.

In 552, Xiao Yi, after defeating Hou, declared himself emperor (as Emperor Yuan). He created Xiao Zhuang the Prince of Yongjia.

In late 554, Western Wei forces attacked and captured Jiangling, which Emperor Yuan had made capital. Around the new year 555, Western Wei forces put Emperor Yuan to death and declared his nephew Xiao Cha emperor (as Emperor Xuan). All but one of Emperor Yuan's sons, Xiao Fangzhi the Prince of Jin'an (who was not at Jiangling), were put to death as well. Most Liang provinces refused to recognize Emperor Xuan as emperor, and the chief of Emperor Yuan's generals, Wang Sengbian, welcomed Xiao Fangzhi to Jiankang, which he controlled, and declared him the Prince of Liang, preparing to make him emperor. Meanwhile, when Jiangling fell, Xiao Zhuang was hidden by the Buddhist nun Famu (法慕) and therefore was spared from his grandfather's and his uncles' fate. Eventually, he was delivered to one of Emperor Yuan's generals, Wang Lin, and Wang Lin delivered him to Jiankang.

Despite Wang Sengbian's intent to make Xiao Zhuang's uncle Xiao Fangzhi emperor, he soon changed his mind when he became fearful of Northern Qi after Northern Qi forces scored several victories against his. He accepted the proposal of Emperor Wenxuan of Northern Qi to make Emperor Yuan's cousin Xiao Yuanming emperor, and he declared Xiao Yuanming emperor in summer 555. Wang Sengbian's lieutenant Chen Baxian was displeased by Wang Sengbian's decision, and in fall 555, he made a surprise attack on Jiankang, killing Wang Sengbian and deposing Xiao Yuanming. He declared Xiao Fangzhi emperor (as Emperor Jing). Northern Qi forces almost immediately attacked, and while Chen was able to repel them, in order to try to make peace with Northern Qi, he sent Xiao Zhuang, as well as his nephew Chen Tanlang (陳曇朗), and Wang Min (王珉) the son of the key official Wang Chong (王沖) as hostages to Northern Qi.

== Reign ==
In 557, Chen Baxian had Emperor Jing yield the throne to him, establishing the Chen dynasty as its Emperor Wu. In spring 558, Wang Lin, who had been resisting Chen and had wanted to try to continue the Liang dynasty, requested assistance from Northern Qi and asked that Xiao Zhuang be returned so that he could be declared emperor. Northern Qi did so, and Wang declared Xiao Zhuang emperor at his headquarters of Jiangxia (江夏, in modern Wuhan, Hubei). Wang served as prime minister, and it appeared that Xiao Zhuang did not actually exercise much imperial power due to his young age. Ten provinces pledged allegiance to him as emperor, making up roughly modern Hunan and central and eastern Hubei.

In 559, after the death of Chen Baxian and succession by Chen Baxian's nephew Emperor Wen of Chen, Wang launched a major attack on Chen, leaving Xiao Zhuang at Jiangxia under the protection of his lieutenant Sun Yang (孫暘). In spring 560, when Western Wei's successor state Northern Zhou heard of Wang's campaign, it launched an attack on Jiangxia and put it under siege. Meanwhile, Wang, engaging Chen general Hou Tian, was defeated and forced to flee to Northern Qi. Xiao Zhuang soon fled to Northern Qi as well, and his territory was divided between Chen and Northern Zhou's vassal Emperor Xuan.

== After reign ==
Northern Qi kept Xiao Zhuang as an honored guest, and in 570, the emperor Gao Wei created Xiao Zhuang the Prince of Liang and made a promise to try to return him to the Liang throne. However, faced with internal issues with corruption and infighting, Northern Qi itself was weakening, and on 22 November 573, Wang Lin, a major proponent of Xiao Zhuang's cause, was captured and killed by the Chen general Wu Mingche during a major Chen attack on Northern Qi. In 577, Northern Qi fell to Northern Zhou. Xiao Zhuang was said to be so upset that he died shortly after at the Northern Qi capital Yecheng.

== Era name ==
- Tianqi (天啟 tiān qǐ) 558–560

Regnal titles
Preceded by Emperor Jing of Liang	Emperor of the Liang dynasty (Eastern); 558–560	Succeeded by None (dynastic claim ended)^{1}
Preceded by Emperor Jing of Liang	Emperor of China (Eastern Hubei/Northern Jiangxi); 558–560	Succeeded by Emperor Wen of Chen
Preceded by Emperor Jing of Liang	Emperor of China (Hunan); 558–560	Succeeded by Emperor Xuan of Western Liang
Notes and references
1. From this point on, Emperor Xuan of Western Liang became the only claimant to the Liang throne.
