= Emperor Xiaoming =

Emperor Xiaoming may refer to:

- Emperor Ming of Han (28–75)
- Emperor Xiaoming of Northern Wei (510–528)
- Xiao Kui (542–585), emperor of Western Liang

== See also ==
- Emperor Xiaomin of Northern Zhou
