= Emperor Jing =

Emperor Jing may refer to:

- Emperor Jing of Han (188-141 BC)
- Emperor Jing of Jin (208-255)
- Emperor Jing of Wu (235-264)
- Emperor Jing of Liang (543-558)
- Emperor Jing of Northern Zhou (573-581)
- Emperor Jing of Western Liang (fl. 607)
