= Empress Dowager Gong =

Chinese empress dowager (died 562)

Empress Dowager Gong (龔太后, personal name unknown) (died June or July 562), formally Empress Dowager Yuan (元太后, literally "the discerning empress dowager") was an empress dowager of the Chinese dynasty Western Liang dynasty. She was the mother of Xiao Cha who founded the Western Liang with the support of Western Wei.

Lady Gong was a concubine of Xiao Tong, the first crown prince of Liang dynasty's founder Emperor Wu. Her rank was the second rank for a concubine of the crown prince, Baolin (保林). She gave birth to Xiao Cha in 519. (It is not known whether any of Xiao Tong's other four known sons were her sons as well, although his oldest son Xiao Huan (蕭歡) was not, as he was the son of Xiao Tong's wife Crown Princess Cai.) Little is known about her background, including her birth family, and Xiao Cha himself appeared to be closer to Crown Princess Cai's nephew Cai Dabao (蔡大寶) than he was with any maternal cousins he might have had.

Historical references to Lady Gong were not numerous. In 549, while Liang was in a state of disarray after the fall of the capital Jiankang to the rebel general Hou Jing and the imperial princes were battling each other, Xiao Cha, then the Prince of Yueyang, was leading an army against his uncle Xiao Yi the Prince of Xiangdong to try to save his brother Xiao Yu (蕭譽) the Prince of Hedong (whom Xiao Yi's forces were besieging), when he left his headquarters Xiangyang in the hands of Cai Dabao and Lady Gong (who was at that time still referred to as Baolin, not as princess dowager), and they defended the city against a surprise attack by the general Du An (杜岸), who served under Xiao Cha but had defected to Xiao Yi. When Xiao Cha retreated at night, Lady Gong, unaware of his military failure, mistook him for the enemy; only until the next morning did she realize that it was him and let him in. Subsequently, in order to fend off Xiao Yi's attacks, Xiao Cha became a Western Wei vassal and was created the Prince of Liang.

In 555, after Western Wei forces had defeated and killed Xiao Yi, Western Wei created Xiao Cha the emperor of (Western) Liang (as Emperor Xuan). While Emperor Xuan posthumously honored Xiao Tong as an emperor and Xiao Tong's wife Crown Princess Cai as an empress, he honored his mother as an empress dowager. After he died in 562 and was succeeded by his son Xiao Kui (as Emperor Ming), Emperor Ming honored her as grand empress dowager. She died about three months after her son.
