= Xiao Xiu =

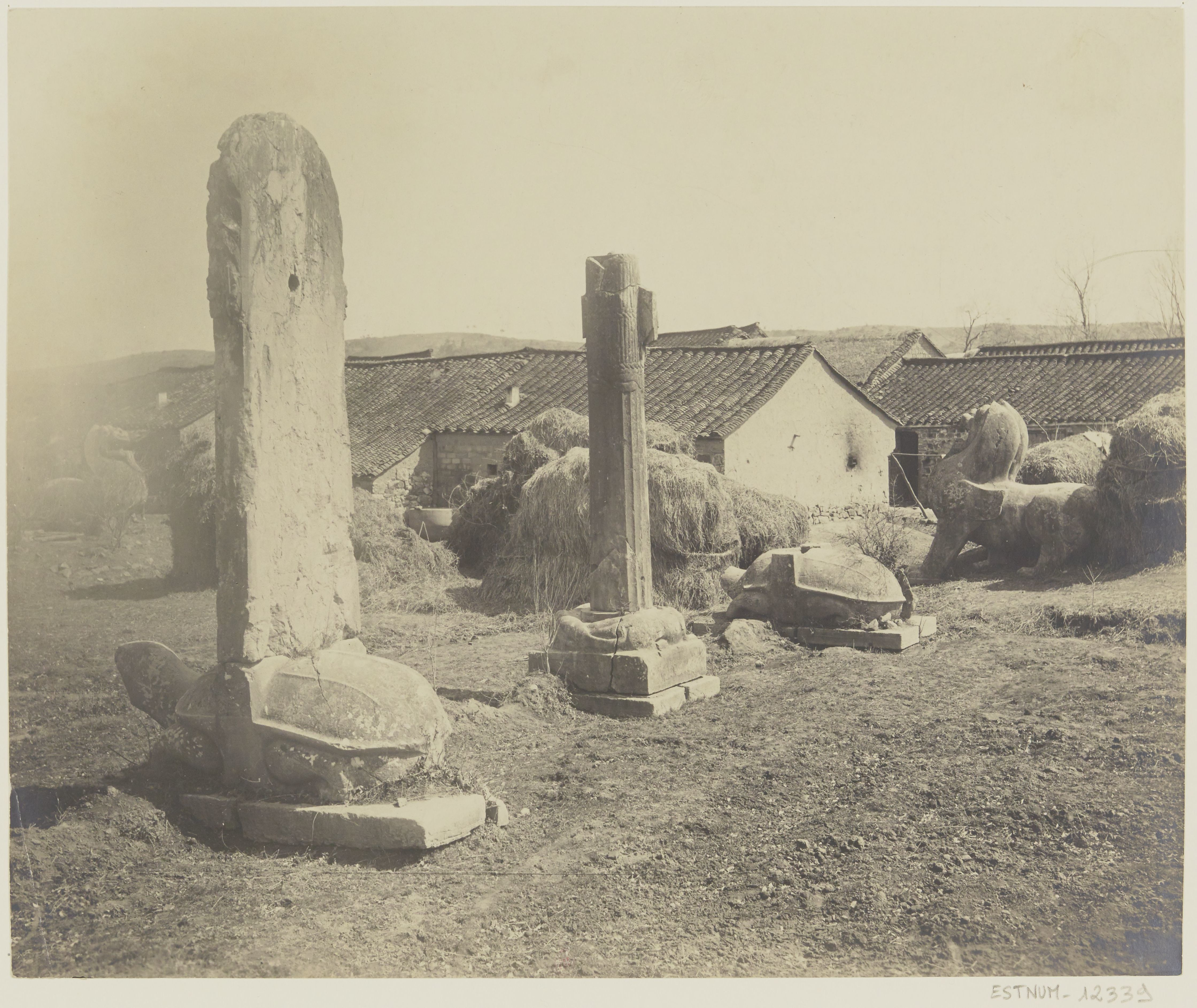
Statuary at Xiao Xiu's tomb. Photo by Victor Segalen, 1917

Xiao Xiu (Chinese: 蕭秀; pinyin: Xiāo Xiù), formally Prince Kang of Ancheng (Chinese: 安成康王; pinyin: Ānchéng Kāng Wáng (475–518), was a younger half-brother of Xiao Yan (Emperor Wu), the founder of the Liang dynasty of China. According to the Book of Liang, he was the 7th son of Xiao Yan's father Xiao Shunzhi.

Xiao Xiu is said to have been a disciple of the Buddhist monk Daodu (道度, 462–527).

== Xiao Xiu's Mausoleum ==
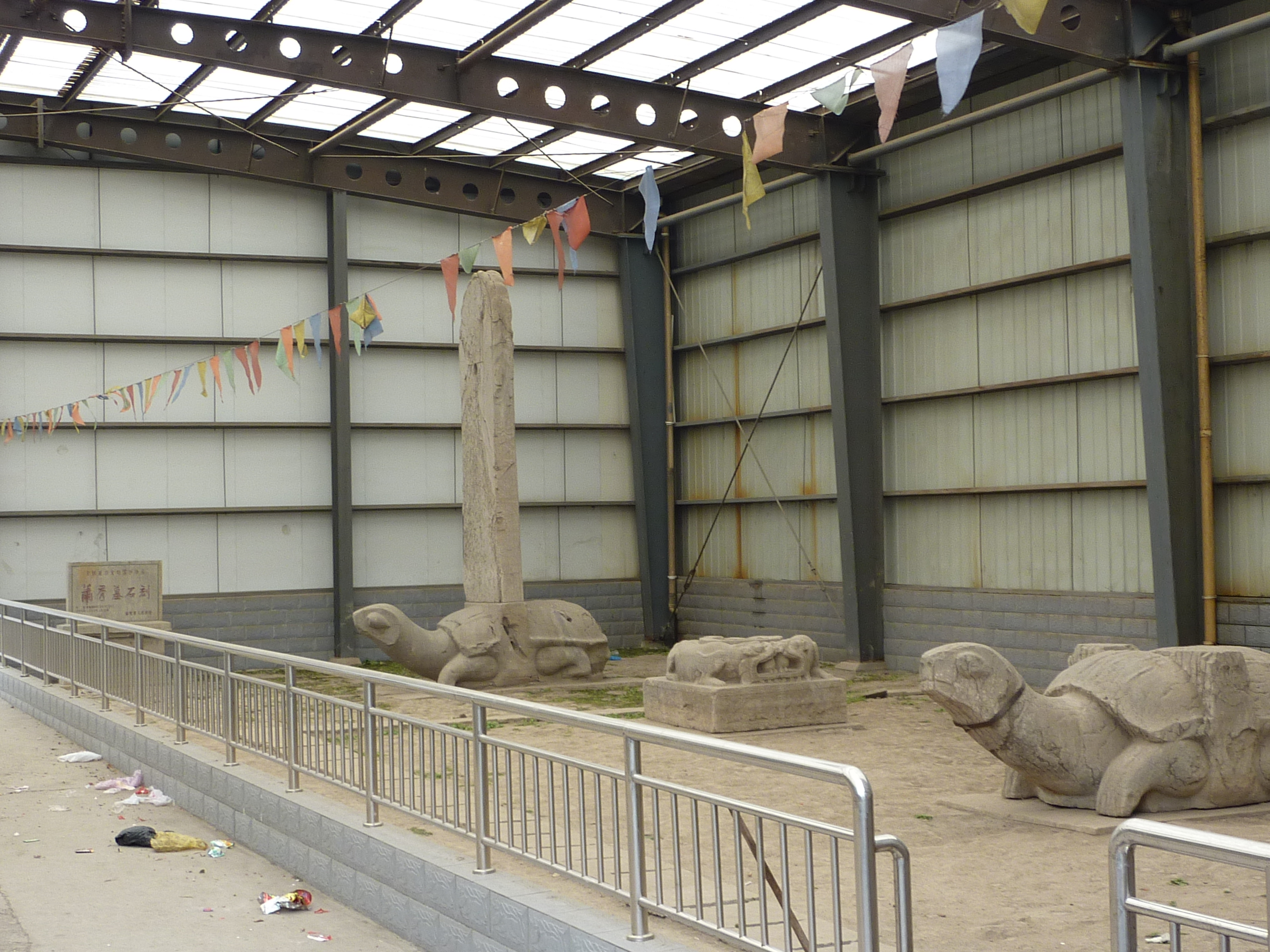
The site in 2011

Xiao Xiu is better remembered not for what he did while alive, but for his tomb, whose assortment of animal sculptures is the most complete set of such statuary surviving from that period.

Xiao Xiu's tomb is located in the Ganjia Lane (Chinese: 甘家巷; pinyin: Gānjiā xiàng) neighborhood in today's Qixia District north-east of Nanjing (32°08′38″N 118°55′02″E). It is thought that the sculptural ensemble of the tomb included a pair of winged lion-like animals (bixie), four steles supported by stone tortoises, and a pair of fluted columns. Visited and photographed by Victor Segalen in 1917, the ensemble of the Tomb of Xiao Xiu (with his name better known under its French transcription, Siao Sieou) soon became well known to Europe's and the world's students of ancient Chinese sculpture. Presently, the site is on the grounds of Gan Jia Xiang Elementary School.
