= Empress Wang (Xiao Cha) =

Empress Wang (Chinese: 王皇后; personal name unknown) (died 563), formally Empress Jing (Chinese: 靜皇后, literally "the meek empress"), was an empress consort of the Chinese Western Liang dynasty. Her husband Xiao Cha (Emperor Xuan) founded the Western Liang with the support of the Western Wei dynasty.

It is not known when she married Xiao Cha, but it is known that she was his wife, not his concubine, and that while he carried the title Prince of Yueyang, she was the Princess of Yueyang. She was the mother of Xiao Cha's first heir Xiao Liao (蕭嶚), although she was not the mother of his eventual heir Xiao Kui (Emperor Ming), whose mother was Xiao Cha's concubine Consort Cao. In 549, when the Liang dynasty was in a state of disarray after the capital Jiankang had fallen to the rebel general Hou Jing, Xiao Cha, then with his headquarters at Xiangyang (襄陽, in modern Xiangfan, Hubei), feared an attack from his uncle Xiao Yi (the future Emperor Yuan) the Prince of Xiangdong, and therefore became a Western Wei vassal. In order to show his loyalty, he sent Princess Wang and his heir apparent Xiao Liao to Western Wei as hostages. At some point, Western Wei allowed her to return to Xiao Cha.

In 555, after Western Wei forces had defeated and killed Xiao Yi, Western Wei made Xiao Cha the emperor. He created Princess Wang empress. In 562, after Emperor Xuan died and was succeeded by Xiao Kui (who had been created crown prince because Xiao Liao died before Emperor Xuan's ascension), Emperor Ming honored her as empress dowager. She died in 563.

== Footnotes ==
^1 Neither Emperor Xuan's son Emperor Ming nor grandson Emperor Jing was recorded in history as having created an empress, although it was possible that either or both did.

Chinese royalty
Preceded by Empress Zhang	Empress of Western Liang; 555–562	Dynasty ended ^{1}
Preceded by Empress Zhang	Empress of China (Western/Central Hubei); 555–562	Succeeded by Empress Dugu of the Sui dynasty
Preceded by Empress Wang (Jing)	Empress of China (Hunan); 560–561	Succeeded by Empress Shen Miaorong of the Chen dynasty
