= Empress Wang (Jing) =

Empress of Liang Dynasty from 555 to 557

Empress Wang (王皇后, personal name unknown) was an empress of the Chinese Liang Dynasty. Her husband was Emperor Jing (Xiao Fangzhi).

It is not known when she was born. Her father Wang Qian (王僉) came from a long line of officials of Southern Dynasties, and he served as a mid-level official under Xiao Yi the Prince of Xiangdong, the de facto leader of Liang following the fall of the capital Jiankang to the rebel general Hou Jing in 549. In 552, after Xiao Yi took the throne as Emperor Yuan after defeating Hou, he created his sons princes, and he took Wang Qian's daughter as the wife for his son Xiao Fangzhi, whom he created the Prince of Jin'an. She therefore carried the title the Princess of Jin'an. Emperor Yuan was captured and killed by Western Wei forces in 554, and in 555, the general Chen Baxian declared Xiao Fangzhi emperor. Emperor Jing created Princess Wang empress. In 557, Chen, who controlled actual power, forced Emperor Jing to yield the throne to him, establishing Chen Dynasty. He created Xiao Fangzhi the Prince of Jiangyin, and Empress Wang thus became the Princess of Jiangyin. Chen had Xiao Fangzhi killed in 558, and nothing further was recorded in history about the former empress.

Chinese royalty
| Preceded by Empress Zhang | Empress of Liang Dynasty (Eastern); 555–557 | Succeeded by None (dynastic claim ended) |
| Preceded by Empress Zhang | Empress of China (Southern); 555–557 | Succeeded by Empress Wang (Xuan) |
| Preceded by Empress Zhang | Emperor of China (Southeastern); 555–557 | Succeeded by Empress Zhang Yao'er of Chen Dynasty |
