= Consort Wang =

Consort Wang may refer to:

- Consort Wang (Wuzong) (819–846), Emperor Wuzong's consort during the Tang dynasty
- Consort Dowager Wang (died 947), Li Siyuan's consort during the Later Tang dynasty

== See also ==
- Empress Wang (disambiguation)
