= Consort Dowager Cao =

Consort Dowager Cao (Chinese: 曹太妃; personal name unknown) (died October or November 562) was an imperial consort of the Chinese Western Liang dynasty. She was a concubine of Emperor Xuan, and she was the mother of his son and crown prince Xiao Kui (Emperor Ming).

Xiao Kui was not initially considered Emperor Xuan's heir, as Emperor Xuan had an older son Xiao Liao (蕭嶚), who was initially his heir apparent. However, by the time that Emperor Xuan took the throne with Western Wei support in 555, Xiao Liao had already died, and so Xiao Kui, as the next son, was created crown prince. When Emperor Xuan died in 562, Xiao Kui succeeded to the throne. He honored Emperor Xuan's wife Empress Wang as empress dowager and honored Consort Cao as consort dowager. Consort Dowager Cao died in the fall of that year.
