= Xiao Dong =

Emperor of the Liang Dynasty from 551 to 552

Xiao Dong 蕭棟

Emperor of the Liang Dynasty
- Reign: 6 October 551 – 1 January 552
- Predecessor: Emperor Jianwen
- Successor: Xiao Ji (in the west); Emperor Yuan (in the central and south); Hou Jing (in the south-east)
- Died: 3 May 552
- Consorts: Lady Zhang
Names
- Family name: Xiāo (蕭); Given name: Dòng (棟)
Era name and dates
- Tiān zhèng (天正): 551
- House: Lanling Xiao
- Father: Xiao Huan
- Mother: Lady Wang

Xiao Dong (Chinese: 蕭棟; died 3 May 552), courtesy name Yuanji (元吉), sometimes known by his pre-ascension title of Prince of Yuzhang (豫章王), was briefly an emperor of the Chinese Liang Dynasty. In 551, with the general Hou Jing in control of the imperial government at the capital Jiankang, Hou, wanting to show off his strength, deposed Xiao Dong's granduncle Emperor Jianwen and replaced him with Xiao Dong, the grandson of Emperor Jianwen's older brother Xiao Tong, who was originally the founder Emperor Wu's crown prince.

During his brief reign, Xiao Dong was entirely under Hou's control. Just two and a half months after Xiao Dong became emperor, Hou forced him to yield the throne to himself, who took the throne as the Emperor of Han. In May 552, troops under Wang Sengbian, a general loyal to Xiao Dong's granduncle Xiao Yi retook Jiankang, and the general Zhu Maichen (朱買臣), under Xiao Yi's instructions, threw Xiao Dong and his two brothers into the Yangtze River to drown.

== Background ==
Not much is known about Xiao Dong's early life, including when he was born. What is known is that he was the oldest son of Xiao Huan (蕭歡) the Prince of Yuzhang, the oldest son of Emperor Wu's oldest son and first crown prince Xiao Tong. When Xiao Tong died in May 531, Emperor Wu had considered, pursuant to Confucian principles of succession, creating Xiao Huan crown prince, but ultimately decided against it and created him only the Prince of Yuzhang. Emperor Wu created Xiao Tong's younger brother Xiao Gang crown prince instead. Xiao Dong's mother was Xiao Huan's wife Princess Wang. He had two younger brothers known to history—Xiao Qiao (蕭橋) and Xiao Jiu (蕭樛). After Xiao Huan's death on 21 January 541, Xiao Dong inherited the title of Prince of Yuzhang.

In 548, the general Hou Jing rebelled and, in 549, captured the capital Jiankang. Hou put the surviving princes of the Xiao imperial clan, including Xiao Dong, under effective house arrest. Emperor Wu died later that year, and Xiao Gang succeeded him as Emperor Jianwen, albeit under Hou's control.

In 551, Hou, after attempting to defeat Emperor Jianwen's brother Xiao Yi the Prince of Xiangdong but being defeated by Xiao Yi's general Wang Sengbian, retreated to Jiankang, and he, believing that his days may be numbered, wanted to take the throne. In order to show off his power, he deposed Emperor Jianwen and replaced him with Xiao Dong. When the imperial procession went to Xiao Dong's residence to escort him to the palace, Xiao Dong and his wife Princess Zhang were tending their garden, growing vegetables to supplement their diet in light of the war-induced famine in the capital region. He was shocked when the imperial procession arrived, and, not sure how to respond, got onto the imperial carriage while crying. Hou declared him emperor.

== Brief reign ==
Xiao Dong had no actual power, as power was in the hands of Hou Jing. Xiao Dong posthumously honored his grandfather Xiao Tong and father Xiao Huan as emperors, and honored his mother Princess Dowager Wang as empress dowager. He created his wife Princess Zhang empress.

Two and a half months after Xiao Dong became emperor, Hou forced Xiao Dong to yield the throne to him. Hou, who became the emperor of a newly declared Han state, created Xiao Dong the Prince of Huaiyin, but imprisoned him and his brothers Xiao Qiao and Xiao Jiu in a secret prison.

== Death ==
In spring 552, Wang Sengbian captured Jiankang, forcing Hou Jing to flee. Xiao Yi had initially ordered Wang to have Xiao Dong killed, but Wang declined—stating that while he was willing to fight Hou, the responsibility of killing an emperor should be entrusted to someone else. Xiao Yi therefore gave the order instead to another general, Zhu Maichen.

Meanwhile, when Hou fled, Xiao Dong and his brothers broke out of their prison, but they were still in chains. They encountered the general Du Shi (杜崱), and Du removed their chains. Xiao Qiao and Xiao Jiu happily stated, "Finally today we have avoided an unnatural death." Xiao Dong responded, "It is difficult to know whether we are facing good fortune or ill fortune. I am still fearful." Soon thereafter, they encounter Zhu, who invited them to drink on his ship. Before they finished, Zhu's guards grabbed them and threw them into the Yangtze River to drown.

== Consorts ==
- Princess consort, of the Zhang clan (王妃 張氏)

Regnal titles
Preceded by Emperor Jianwen of Liang	Emperor of Liang Dynasty (Western); 551	Succeeded by Xiao Ji (Prince of Wuling)
Preceded by Emperor Jianwen of Liang	Emperor of Liang Dynasty (Central/Southern); 551	Succeeded by Emperor Yuan of Liang
Preceded by Emperor Jianwen of Liang	Emperor of China (Southeastern); 551	Succeeded by Hou Jing of Han
