= Xiao Tong =

Crown Prince of Liang Dynasty (501–531)

- Crown Prince of Liang Dynasty
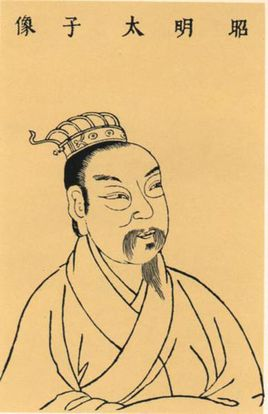
- Portrait of Xiao Tong from Sancai Tuhui
- Born: c.October 501
- Died: 7 May 531 (aged 29)
- Spouse: Crown Princess Cai (fl.508 - 531 (Note: Lady Cai was recorded to have outlived her husband as after his death, she moved to Jinhua Palace (金华宫) with Lu Xiang (陆襄) as the official in charge of the palace. Lu Xiang's biography in Book of Liang indicated that he received his next appointment in 535 (7th year of the Zhong Da'tong era, although the era name was changed to Da'tong on 18 Feb 535 (1st day of the lunar year)). Thus, it is possible (but not certain) that Lady Cai died in late 534/early 535.)); Empress Dowager Gong
- Issue: Xiao Huan, Prince An of Yuzhang; Xiao Yu, Prince Wuhuan of Hedong; Xiao Cha, Emperor Xuan of Western Liang; Xiao Pi, Prince of Wuchang; Xiao Jian, Prince of Yiyang
Posthumous name
- Emperor Zhaoming 昭明皇帝
Temple name
- Gaozong 高宗
- Father: Emperor Wu of Liang
- Mother: Ding Lingguang

Xiao Tong (traditional Chinese: 蕭統; simplified Chinese: 萧统; pinyin: Xiāo Tǒng; Wade–Giles: Hsiao T'ung, c.October 501 – 7 May 531), courtesy name Deshi (德施), formally Zhaoming Taizi (昭明太子, literally "Accomplished and Understanding Crown Prince"), was a crown prince of the Chinese Liang dynasty, posthumously honored as Emperor Zhaoming (昭明皇帝). He was the oldest son and heir apparent of Emperor Wu of Liang, whom he predeceased. Xiao Tong's enduring legacy is the literary compendium Wen Xuan (Selections of Refined Literature).

== Birth and childhood ==
Xiao Tong was born to Xiao Yan, then a Southern Qi general nearing final victory in a civil war against the cruel and violent emperor Xiao Baojuan, in winter 501. He was born at Xiao Yan's power base of Xiangyang, to Xiao Yan's concubine Ding Lingguang (丁令光). (Note: Xiao Yan's wife Chi Hui (郗徽) had died in 499, and from that point on he had only concubines and never made any of them his wife.) After Xiao Yan's victory later in 501, he forced Emperor He of Southern Qi, whom he had supported as a rival claimant to the Southern Qi throne, to yield the throne to him in 502, ending Southern Qi and starting Liang Dynasty (as its Emperor Wu). The officials requested that he make Xiao Tong, then an infant, the crown prince. While Emperor Wu initially declined on account that the empire had not been pacified, he did so on 24 December 502, when Xiao Tong was only one year old. After Xiao Tong was created crown prince, his mother Consort Ding, while not made empress, was given a special status co-equal with her son.

Xiao Tong was said to be intelligent, kind, and obedient to his parents from his childhood. As per customs of the time, in 506, he was housed in the Yongfu Mansion (永福省), the residence for the crown prince, in his childhood, but he missed his parents, and so every few days or so Emperor Wu would spend several days at Yongfu Mansion. (Note: Whether Consort Ding did the same is not recorded in history.)

On 17 May 508, he was wedded to his main wife Lady Cai. (Note: Lady Cai being the Crown Princess Consort was found in her great-grandfather Cai Kuo's (蔡廓) biography in History of the Southern Dynasties, under the entry for her father Cai Zun (蔡撙). The entry in Emperor Wu's biography in Book of Liang merely mentioned that the Crown Prince was wedded on that day.)

On 31 January 515, he went through his rite of passage and was declared an adult, and Emperor Wu bestowed him a crown.

== As adult ==
As Emperor Wu was an avid Buddhist, Xiao Tong also became one, and he studied sutras intently, often inviting Buddhist monks to his palace to preach and to discuss Buddhist doctrines. After his rite of passage, Emperor Wu also began to gradually have him handle more and more matters of state, becoming less involved in the day-to-day operations of the empire.

On 9 December 522, Xiao Tong's uncle Xiao Dan (蕭憺) the Prince of Shixing died. By custom, a crown prince would not hold a mourning period for an uncle, but Xiao Tong believed this custom to be unfilial, and therefore requested the officials to further discuss the matter. After the official Liu Xiaochuo (劉孝綽) suggested that he hold a one-month mourning period, he agreed, and in fact made this a precedent for the Liang Dynasty.

During this period, Xiao Tong and others compiled a compendium of ancient poetry and texts, which he referred to as Wenxuan (文選, "Selections of Refined Literature"), which was later known after his death as the Zhaoming Wenxuan (昭明文選, "Zhaoming" being his posthumous name). It is a work of historical importance, as it preserved many ancient texts which otherwise might have been lost.

In late 526, Consort Ding grew ill, and Xiao Tong spent his days attending to her without rest. She died on 3 January 527, and Xiao Tong was so saddened that he ate nothing. It was after Emperor Wu tried to console him by pointing out that he should not harm his body and that he still had his father that Xiao Tong began to take porridge, but he ate nothing further. He was described to be fairly obese until that point, but he lost a lot of weight during the mourning period for Consort Ding.

== Death ==
The death of Consort Ding brought about a disastrous effect in Xiao Tong's relationship with his father, however. Xiao Tong sought out an appropriate place to bury Consort Ding, but while he was doing so, a landowner bribed the eunuch Yu Sanfu (俞三副) into convincing Emperor Wu that that piece of land would bring good fortune for the emperor, and so Emperor Wu bought the land and buried Consort Ding there. However, once Consort Ding was buried, a Taoist monk informed Xiao Tong that he believed that the land would bring ill fortune for Consort Ding's oldest son—Xiao Tong. Xiao Tong therefore allowed the monk to bury a few items intended to dissolve and defuse the ill fortune, such as wax geese, at the position reserved for the oldest son. Later on, when one of Xiao Tong's attendants, Bao Miaozhi (鮑邈之), was squeezed out of Xiao Tong's inner circles by another attendant, Wei Ya (魏雅), he, in resentment, reported to Emperor Wu that Wei had carried out sorcery on Xiao Tong's behalf. When Emperor Wu investigated, waxed geese were found, and Emperor Wu became surprised and angry, and wanted to investigate further. He only stopped the investigation when he was advised to do so by the prime minister Xu Mian, executing only the Taoist monk who had suggested the burial of wax gooses. Xiao Tong was humiliated in the affair, and was never able to clear himself completely in his father's eyes.

Xiao Tong died in May 531. Even when he was very ill, because he was afraid that Emperor Wu's own health would be affected if he showed his eldest son and heir concern, (Note: By 531, Emperor Wu was about 67 years old.) Xiao Tong still personally wrote submissions to his father. After his death, Emperor Wu personally attended his wake and buried him at a tomb appropriate for an emperor. He also summoned Xiao Tong's oldest son, Xiao Huan (蕭歡) the Duke of Huarong back to the capital Jiankang, preparing to create Xiao Huan crown prince to replace his father. However, still resentful over the wax geese affair, he hesitated for days without carrying out the creation, and finally did not do so. Instead, against popular opinion, he created Xiao Tong's younger brother, also by Consort Ding, Xiao Gang crown prince. In 551, when Xiao Gang, then emperor (as Emperor Jianwen) but under control and virtual house arrest by the revolting general Hou Jing, Hou, to try to show off his power, deposed Emperor Jianwen and made Xiao Tong's grandson Xiao Dong the Prince of Yuzhang emperor. It was then that Xiao Tong was posthumously honored an emperor.

== Literary legacy ==
Xiao Tong is survived by his great literary compendium, the Wenxuan, an anthology of literature divided into 60 chapters. Chapter 29 preserves the Nineteen Old Poems, a major source for early Classical Chinese poetry. Xiao appears to consider these to be anonymous works, a view supported by modern scholarship, despite the claims of Xu Ling in his New Songs from the Jade Terrace.

== Family ==
Consorts and Issue:

- Empress Zhaode, of the Cai clan (昭德皇后 蔡氏)
  - Xiao Huan, Prince An of Yuzhang (豫章安王 蕭歡, d. 21 January 541), first son
- Empress Dowager Yuan, of the Gong clan (元太后龔氏, d.562)
  - Xiao Cha, Emperor Xuan (宣帝 蕭詧; 519–562), third son
- Unknown
  - Xiao Yu, Prince Wuhuan of Hedong (河东武桓王 蕭譽, 519? – 22 June 550), second son
  - Xiao Pi, Prince of Wuchang (武昌郡王 蕭譬, d. 17 September 546), fourth son
  - Xiao Jian, Prince of Yiyang (義陽郡王 蕭鑒, d. 7 August 537), fifth son
  - Princess Luling (庐陵公主), first daughter
    - married Wang Kuan (王㳬)
