= Xiao Kui =

Emperor of Western Liang from 562 to 585

Emperor Ming of Western Liang 西梁明帝

Emperor of the Western Liang dynasty
- Reign: 562–585
- Predecessor: Xiao Cha, Emperor Xuan of Western Liang
- Successor: Xiao Cong, Emperor Jing of Western Liang
- Born: 542
- Died: 585
- Spouse: Lady Zhang
- Issue: Xiao Cong, Emperor Jing; Xiao Huan, Prince of Yixing; Xiao Zhuan, Prince of Jinlin; Xiao Jing, Prince of Linhai; Xiao Xun, Prince of Nanhai; Xiao Yang, Prince of Yi'an/Marquess of Taoqiu; Xiao Yu, Prince of Xin'an/Duke of Song; Lady Xiao, Empress Min of Sui
Names
- Xiao Kui (蕭巋)
Era dates
- Tianbao (天保 tiān bǎo)
Posthumous name
- Emperor Xiaoming (孝明皇帝) literary meaning: "filial and understanding"
Temple name
- Shizong (世宗)
- House: Western Liang dynasty
- Father: Xiao Cha
- Mother: Consort Cao

Emperor Ming of Western Liang ((西)梁明帝; 542 – 1 July 585), personal name Xiao Kui (蕭巋), courtesy name Renyuan (仁遠), was an emperor of the Chinese Western Liang dynasty. He, like his father Emperor Xuan and his son Emperor Jing, controlled little territory and relied heavily on military support from the Northern Zhou dynasty and its successor state, the Sui dynasty.

== Background ==
Xiao Kui was born in 542, during the reign of his great-grandfather Emperor Wu of Liang. His father was Emperor Wu's grandson Xiao Cha the Prince of Yueyang, and his mother was Xiao Cha's concubine Lady Cao. Xiao Kui's grandfather Xiao Tong had been Emperor Wu's first crown prince, but the succession was diverted away from Xiao Tong's line after Xiao Tong's death in May 531—to Xiao Tong's younger brother Xiao Gang. Xiao Kui's father Xiao Cha was displeased about this development, and so prepared to contend for the throne eventually. After Liang was thrown into a state of confusion after the rebel general Hou Jing captured the capital Jiankang in 549, holding Emperor Wu and later Xiao Gang (Emperor Jianwen) as hostages, Xiao Cha feared that his uncle Xiao Yi, who appeared intent on eliminating actual or potential competitors for the throne, and so surrendered his realm of Yong Province (雍州, modern northwestern Hubei) to Western Wei, seeking Western Wei's protection. Xiao Yi claimed the imperial throne in 552 after defeating Hou, but was himself defeated by Western Wei forces in 554 and executed in January 555.

Western Wei declared Xiao Cha the Emperor of Western Liang (as Emperor Xuan), as a vassal of Western Wei. As Xiao Kui's older brother and Emperor Xuan's original heir apparent Xiao Liao (蕭嶚) had died earlier, Emperor Xuan created Xiao Kui crown prince. Emperor Xuan was, however, never able to gain much support among Liang's provinces and was only able to hold a small amount of territory around his capital Jiangling (江陵, in modern Jingzhou, Hubei). He relied on the support of Western Wei and its successor state Northern Zhou, and in turn had his authorities severely curtailed by the commandant of Jiangling that Western Wei/Northern Zhou stationed at Jiangling to defend him as well as to watch over him. He was said to die from his depression in 562, and Xiao Kui inherited the throne (as Emperor Ming), continuing to be a vassal of Northern Zhou.

== Reign ==
=== During Northern Zhou ===
Emperor Ming honored his grandmother Empress Dowager Gong as grand empress dowager, his father Emperor Xuan's wife Empress Wang as empress dowager, and his mother Consort Cao as consort dowager. (Grand Empress Dowager Gong and Consort Dowager Cao both died in 562, and Empress Dowager Wang died in 563.) For reasons unclear in historical records, Emperor Ming was not recorded as having created an empress, and while at some point during his reign he created his son Xiao Cong crown prince, it is not known when that occurred. He was said to be a learned ruler, writing some 14 different works on filial piety as well as on fortunetelling, but as his fortunetelling works suggested, he was also said to be highly superstitious. He was said to be filially pious and kind, and was also a capable administrator, being able to allow his war-weary subjects to rest and recover.

After Emperor Wen of Chen died in 566 and was succeeded by his young son Emperor Fei of Chen, the Chen dynasty high level officials became locked in a power struggle, and in 567 Emperor Fei's uncle Chen Xu the Prince of Ancheng killed Liu Shizhi (劉師之) and Dao Zhongju (到仲舉) and took over power. The general Hua Jiao (華皎), the governor of Xiang Province (湘州, roughly modern Changsha, Hunan), apprehensive about Chen Xu's intentions toward him, secretly submitted to Western Liang and Northern Zhou, seeking aid from both. Emperor Wu of Northern Zhou and his regent Yuwen Hu commissioned Emperor Wu's brother Yuwen Zhi (宇文直) the Prince of Wei with an army, and Emperor Ming also gathered his own troops, commanded by his general Wang Cao (王操), to aid Hua. However, when their forces, along with Hua's, encountered the Chen forces, commanded by the generals Chunyu Liang (淳于量) and Wu Mingche at Dunkou (沌口, in modern Wuhan, Hubei), they were defeated by Chen forces, and both Hua and Yuwen Zhi were forced to flee to Jiangling. The Northern Zhou general Yuan Ding (元定) and the Western Liang general Li Guang (李廣) were captured. Wu took this opportunity to seize Western Liang's Hedong Commandery (河東, in modern Jingzhou) as well. Yuwen Zhi blamed the defeat on the Western Liang general Yin Liang (殷亮), and Emperor Ming, while knowing that Yin was not at fault, was unwilling to oppose Yuwen Zhi, and so executed Yin.

In spring 568, Wu put Jiangling under siege and redirected the waters to try to flood it. Emperor Ming, escorted by the Northern Zhou commandant Tian Hong (田弘), fled to the nearby fort of Ji'nan (紀南). The vice commandant Gao Lin (高琳) and Wang remained at Jiangling and defended it for over 100 days, until the Western Liang generals Ma Wu (馬武) and Ji Che (吉徹) counterattacked and defeated Wu, forcing him to withdraw and allowing Emperor Ming to return to Jiangling.

In fall 570, Chen general Zhang Zhaoda put Jiangling under siege, while capturing the Northern Zhou-built fort of Anshu (安蜀, near the Three Gorges). Jiangling nearly fell, and only after Yuwen Zhi sent aid via forces commanded by Li Qianzhe (李遷哲) to relieve the city did Zhang withdraw.

In 571, Hua, who had served as an official under Emperor Ming since his defeat in 567, went instead to the Northern Zhou capital Chang'an. On the way, he met Yuwen Zhi at Yuwen Zhi's defense post of Xiangyang (襄陽, in modern Xiangfan, Hubei). He pointed out to Yuwen Zhi that Western Liang had lost so much territory that it was poor and unable to fend for itself, advocating that it would be sound policy for Northern Zhou to loan several provinces or prefectures to Western Liang. Yuwen Zhi agreed and submitted the proposal to Emperor Wu; in response, Emperor Wu gave three provinces—Ji (基州), Ping (平州), and Ruo (鄀州) (together making up about modern Jingmen and Yichang, Hubei) to Western Liang.

In 577, after Northern Zhou's Emperor Wu conquered Northern Qi and seized its territory, Emperor Ming went to greet Emperor Wu at Northern Qi's former capital Yecheng. Initially, while Emperor Wu treated Emperor Ming with ceremonial respect, he did not consider Emperor Ming as an important vassal. Emperor Ming sensed this, and, at a feast, discussed how Emperor Ming's father Emperor Xuan owed much to Emperor Wu's father, Western Wei's paramount general and regent Yuwen Tai, and in doing so was so emotional that he wept bitterly. Emperor Wu was impressed, and treated him with greater respect. Emperor Ming also spent much effort to flatter Emperor Wu—including comparing him to the mythical emperors Emperor Yao and Shun. Emperor Wu was flattered, and rewarded Emperor Ming with much treasure, as well as some of the Northern Qi emperor Gao Wei's concubines.

In 578, Northern Zhou's Emperor Wu died and was succeeded by his erratic and cruel son Emperor Xuan. In 580, Emperor Xuan died as well, and Emperor Xuan's father-in-law Yang Jian seized power as regent over Emperor Xuan's young son Emperor Jing of Northern Zhou. The Northern Zhou general Yuchi Jiong, suspicious of Yang's intentions, rose at Yecheng against Yang. Most Western Liang generals advised Emperor Ming to align himself with Yuchi—reasoning that if Yuchi were successful, he would be rewarded with being loyal to the imperial Yuwen clan, while if Yuchi were not successful, he could nevertheless take this opportunity to seize some territory. However, when Emperor Ming sent the official Liu Zhuang (柳莊) to Chang'an to observe the situation, Yang, citing that he had previously been a guest of Emperor Ming while he was stationed as a general at Jiangling (although historical records do not indicate when he was there), begged Western Liang's loyalty. Liu, believing that Yuchi would not succeed, returned to Jiangling and advised Emperor Ming to side with Yang. Emperor Ming agreed, and subsequently, when Yang defeated Yuchi, commented to Liu, "If I had listened to the others, the empire would have been destroyed."

=== During the Sui dynasty ===
In spring 581, Yang Jian had Emperor Jing yield the throne to him, ending Northern Zhou and establishing the Sui dynasty as its Emperor Wen. Soon thereafter, Emperor Ming sent his brother Xiao Yan (蕭巖) the Prince of Anping to Chang'an to congratulate Emperor Wen and to pledge loyalty.

In 582, Emperor Wen, to further honor Emperor Ming, offered to take one of his daughters as the wife to Emperor Wen's favored son Yang Guang the Prince of Jin. Emperor Ming, after trying to divine the fortunes, determined that all of his daughters were inappropriate choices—but then remembered that he had a daughter, who was born in the second month of the year and thus, by superstitions of the time, considered ill fortune and therefore was raised by her maternal uncle Zhang Ke (張軻). He summoned her back to the palace, and the diviners indicated that she would be a fit, and therefore she was married to Yang Guang. (Emperor Wen also wanted to give his own daughter Princess Lanling to Emperor Ming's son Xiao Yang (蕭瑒) the Prince of Yi'an, but for reasons unclear ultimately did not do so.) Because of this marital relationship, Emperor Wen decided to withdraw the Commandant of Jiangling from Jiangling. Thereafter, for a brief duration, Emperor Ming was able to rule his state with decreased interference from Sui. In 583, when Sui moved its capital from the old city of Chang'an to a nearby, newly constructed capital Daxing (大興), Emperor Ming sent his crown prince Xiao Cong to congratulate Emperor Wen. In spring 584, Emperor Ming himself went to the new capital to pay homage to Emperor Wen, and both of them dressed in imperial garbs, although Emperor Ming dressed slightly less impressively to show his status as a vassal.

In summer 585, Emperor Ming died. Xiao Cong succeeded him (as Emperor Jing).

== Era name ==
- Tianbao (天保 tiān bǎo) 562-585

== Family ==
=== Consorts and issue ===
- Empress Zhang, of the Zhang clan (張皇后)
  - Xiao Jing, Prince of Linhai (临海王萧璟, d. 639), 4th son
  - Princess Xiao (蕭公主, 566 – 17 April 648), 3rd daughter
    - married Yang Guang (楊廣), a son of Yang Jian, and had issue. ( two sons and a daughter)
  - Xiao Yu, Prince of Xin'an (新安王萧瑀, 574–647), 8th son
- Unknown
  - Xiao Cong, Emperor Jing (靖帝蕭琮, 558 – 607), 1st son
  - Second son
  - Xiao Huan, Prince of Yixing (义兴王萧瓛, 569 – 588), 3rd son
  - Xiao Zhuan, Prince of Jinlin (晋陵王蕭瑑), 4th son
  - Xiao Xun, Prince of Nanhai (南海王萧珣), 6th son
  - Xiao Yang, Prince of Yi'an (义安王萧玚, 573 – 25 January 612), 7th son
  - Princess Jin'an (晋安郡长公主, 588 – 614), 1st daughter
    - married Wang Gun (王衮), a son of Wang Song (王诵)
  - Lady Xiao (萧氏), 2nd daughter
    - marries Dou Wei (竇威), a son of Dou Chi (窦炽)
  - Four daughters
  - Lady Xiao (萧氏), 7th daughter

Regnal titles
Preceded by Emperor Xuan of Western Liang	Emperor of Western Liang dynasty 562–585	Succeeded by Emperor Jing of Western Liang
