= Xiao Cha =

Emperor of Western Liang from 555 to 562

Emperor Xuan of Western Liang 西梁宣帝

Emperor of the Western Liang dynasty
- Reign: 7 February 555 – 562
- Predecessor: Emperor Yuan of Liang (Liang dynasty)
- Successor: Xiao Kui
- Liang Emperor(s): Emperor Min; Emperor Jing
- Born: 519
- Died: 562 (aged 42–43)
- Spouse: Empress Wang; Consort Cao
Names
- Xiao Cha (蕭詧) Courtesy name Lisun (理孫)
Posthumous name
- Emperor Xuan (宣皇帝)
Temple name
- Zhongzong (中宗)
- Father: Xiao Tong
- Mother: Empress Dowager Gong

Emperor Xuan of Western Liang ((西)梁宣帝; 519 – March or April 562), personal name Xiao Cha (蕭詧), courtesy name Lisun (理孫), was the founding emperor of the Western Liang dynasty of China. He took the throne of the Liang dynasty with support from the Western Wei dynasty after Western Wei forces had defeated and killed his uncle Emperor Yuan in January 555. However, scholars consider his regime, known as the Western Liang or Later Liang in historiography, to be separate from the Liang dynasty proper.

== Early life ==
Xiao Cha was born in 519, as the third son of Xiao Tong, then the crown prince to Liang Dynasty's founder Emperor Wu. His mother was Xiao Tong's concubine Consort Gong. He was considered studious, concentrating particularly on Buddhist sutras, and as Emperor Wu was a devout Buddhist, he was happy that his grandson studied sutras in this manner. When Emperor Wu created Xiao Tong's sons dukes sometime between 520 and 527, Xiao Cha was created the Duke of Qujiang (曲江县公) in 525.

In May 531, Xiao Tong died, but instead of creating Xiao Tong's oldest son Xiao Huan (蕭歡) the Duke of Huarong crown prince to succeed him (as was expected under Confucian principles of succession), Emperor Wu created Xiao Tong's younger brother Xiao Gang crown prince instead. However, he felt that he did not treat Xiao Tong's sons fairly, and therefore he created them princes—in Xiao Cha's case, the Prince of Yueyang—and gave them honors only slightly subordinate to their uncles. Because the capital commandery of Eastern Yang Province (東揚州, modern central and eastern Zhejiang), Kuaiji Commandery (the southern shore of Hangzhou Bay), was the richest commandery of the entire empire, he rotated them as the governor of Eastern Yang Province, and Xiao Cha was thus rotated there on 12 August 538. However, despite these special treatments, Xiao Cha was still angry that he and his brothers were passed over by Emperor Wu. He saw that Emperor Wu, late in his long reign (since 502), was ruling over an imperial regime that was becoming inefficient and beset by factionalism between Emperor Wu's sons. Therefore, when he was made the governor of Yong Province (雍州, modern northwestern Hubei) on 14 November 546, he thought that this would be a good chance for him to establish a power base of his own, and therefore he cultivated the loyalty of the people to him by governing carefully.

== Struggles against Xiao Yi (Emperor Yuan) ==
In 548, the general Hou Jing rebelled and attacked the capital Jiankang, capturing it in 549 and taking Emperor Wu and Crown Prince Gang hostage. (Emperor Wu died later that year and was succeeded by Crown Prince Gang (as Emperor Jianwen), albeit under Hou's control.) Meanwhile, also in 548, Emperor Wu had made Xiao Cha's older brother Xiao Yu (蕭譽) the Prince of Hedong the governor of Xiang Province (湘州, modern central Hunan), rotating the previous governor of Xiang Province, Zhang Zuan (張纘) to Yong Province. Zhang was a close friend of Emperor Wu's powerful son Xiao Yi the Prince of Xiangdong, who was then the governor of the key Jing Province (荊州, modern western and central Hubei), and he did not take Xiao Yu seriously, making Xiao Yu felt disrespected. Xiao Yu therefore detained Zhang and did not permit him to leave. Further, when Xiao Yi called for the provincial governors in his command region (which, inter alia, included both Xiang and Yong Provinces) to send troops to help lift the siege on Jiankang, Xiao Yu refused, and while Xiao Cha sent a detachment, he refused to command the detachment personally. When Zhang fled from Xiao Yu's custody late in 548, then, he went to Xiao Yi, and, bearing grudges against Xiao Yu, falsely accused Xiao Yu, Xiao Cha, and their cousin Xiao Cao (蕭慥) the Prince of Guiyang and governor of Xin Province (信州, modern eastern Chongqing) of conspiring against Xiao Yi. Xiao Yi therefore killed Xiao Cao and prepared an army to attack Xiao Yu.

Xiao Yu was initially able to repel Xiao Yi's attack and cause Xiao Yi's heir apparent Xiao Fangdeng (蕭方等) to die in battle in summer 549, but by fall 549, he had been defeated by Xiao Yi's general Bao Quan (鮑泉), who put Xiao Yu's headquarters at Changsha (長沙, in modern Changsha, Hunan) under siege. Xiao Yu requested aid from Xiao Cha, and Xiao Cha commanded an army to attack Xiao Yi's headquarters at Jiangling. He put Jiangling under siege, but his attack was affected by heavy rains and repelled by Xiao Yi's general Wang Sengbian, and when his own general Du Ze (杜崱) surrendered to Xiao Yi, and Du Ze's brother Du An (杜岸) further launched a surprise attack on Xiao Cha's headquarters at Xiangyang (襄陽, in modern Xiangfan, Hubei), Xiao Cha was forced to withdraw back to Xiangyang. Unable to help his brother and fearing that he would become Xiao Yi's next target—indeed, Xiao Yi then sent the general Liu Zhongli (柳仲禮) to attack Xiao Cha—Xiao Cha submitted to Western Wei, offering to become a vassal, and sought aid, sending his wife Princess Wang and his heir apparent Xiao Liao (蕭嶚) to Western Wei as hostages. Yuwen Tai, the paramount general of Western Wei, accepted Xiao Cha's submission and sent the general Yang Zhong (楊忠) to aid Xiao Cha, and Yang defeated and captured Liu in spring 550. Yang subsequently entered into a treaty with Xiao Yi, putting Xiao Cha under Western Wei's protection. Xiao Yi sacked Changsha and executed Xiao Yu in 550.

In the summer of 550, Western Wei offered to declare Xiao Cha the Emperor of Liang to inherit Emperor Wu's throne. Xiao Cha declined, but accepted the lesser title of Prince of Liang and also assumed acting imperial authority. Later that year, made a trip to the Western Wei capital Chang'an to pay homage to Emperor Wen of Western Wei and Yuwen. In spring 551, when his uncle Xiao Guan (蕭綸) the Prince of Shaoling was captured and killed by Western Wei troops commanded by Yang, Xiao Cha, who respected Xiao Guan, took his body and buried it with honors. In summer 551, when he heard that Hou was launching an attack on Xiao Yi's domain, he sent his general Cai Dabao (蔡大寶) with an army heading toward Jiangling, claiming to be ready to render assistance, but after Xiao Yi sent a rebuking letter, he ordered Cai to withdraw.

In 552, after defeating Hou, Xiao Yi declared himself emperor (as Emperor Yuan) and set his capital at Jiangling. Believing himself to be strong, he was arrogant in his dealings with Western Wei, drawing attention from Yuwen, who began to consider invading Liang. When Xiao Cha became aware of this, he paid additional tribute to Western Wei to try to fan the flame. Subsequently, in spring 553, when Emperor Yuan not only made the Western Wei envoy Yuwen Renshu (宇文仁恕) felt insulted by not treating him with as much respect as the envoy from Northern Qi, but further made demands to Yuwen Tai to return former Liang territory taken by Western Wei, Yuwen Tai decided to invade the Liang. In winter 553, Northern Zhou troops, commanded by Yu Jin, arrived at Xiangyang, and Xiao Cha's forces joined them and continued to advance south toward Jiangling. Emperor Yuan was caught unprepared, and while he summoned his generals Wang Sengbian and Wang Lin to come to his aid, Emperor Yuan surrendered before they could arrive. Xiao Cha took the custody of Emperor Yuan, interrogating and insulting him heavily. Around the new year 555, with approval from Western Wei authorities, Xiao Cha put Emperor Yuan to death by suffocating him with a large bag full of dirt. He also executed Emperor Yuan's sons who were captured when Jiangling fell.

== Reign ==
Western Wei created Xiao Cha Emperor of (Western) Liang, and he declared himself as such in spring 555 (as Emperor Xuan). Western Wei forces transferred Jiangling and the surrounding area to Emperor Xuan, but required him to transfer control of the Xiangyang region in exchange, and further left a military garrison at Jiangling, both to protect Emperor Xuan and to make sure that he would not rebel. Further, Western Wei troops pillaged Jiangling and took most of the inhabitants and the Liang imperial treasures back to Chang'an. While Western Wei troops under Yu were still at Jiangling, Emperor Xuan's subordinate Yin Deyi (尹德毅) suggested that he make a surprise attack on Yu and slaughter the Western Wei troops, then reassert Liang's independence. Emperor Xuan declined, reasoning that Western Wei had protected him greatly and that to turn against Western Wei would be unjust. He later regretted the decision, but the decision was probably a correct one as the other Liang generals showed no inclination of recognizing him as emperor. (As whether Emperor Xuan was a "legitimate" emperor of Liang was thereafter historically debated, his state is usually referred to by historians as either Western Liang or Later Liang.)

Emperor Xuan posthumously honored his father Xiao Tong and Xiao Tong's wife Crown Princess Cai as emperor and empress, and honored his mother Consort Gong as empress dowager. He created his wife Princess Wang empress, and as his heir apparent Xiao Liao had died by this point, he created Xiao Liao's younger brother Xiao Kui as crown prince. He entrusted much of the governmental matters to Cai Dabao and Wang Cao (王操), both of whom served him faithfully. He appeared to have full expectation that he would be able to put additional Liang provinces under his control, but immediately, the Liang generals, including Wang Sengbian and Wang Lin, refused to recognize him. Wang Lin, who controlled modern Hunan and later parts of modern Hubei, indeed, sent his general Hou Ping (侯平) to attack Emperor Xuan, and while the attack was unsuccessful, Emperor Xuan was unable to expand his holdings.

Later in 555, Wang Sengbian declared Emperor Yuan's cousin Xiao Yuanming emperor. In fall 555, after Wang Sengbian was killed by his lieutenant Chen Baxian, Chen deposed Xiao Yuanming and declared Emperor Yuan's son Xiao Fangzhi emperor (as Emperor Jing). After Chen had Emperor Jing yield the throne to him in 558, establishing Chen Dynasty as its Emperor Wu, Wang Lin declared Emperor Yuan's grandson Xiao Zhuang emperor, thus maintaining a competing claim for the Liang throne.

In late 558, with Wang Lin having advanced east to try to attack Chen, Emperor Xuan sent Wang Cao to try to seize the commanderies forming modern Hunan from Xiao Zhuang's domain, although the scope of success for this action was unclear. In any case, however, when Hou Tian, a general of Chen Baxian's nephew Emperor Wen of Chen defeated Wang Lin in spring 560, a combination of Emperor Xuan's and Northern Zhou troops were able to take the western half of Xiao Zhuang's territory, and Emperor Xuan assumed control over that territory, albeit requiring Northern Zhou military support.

In fall 560, Hou Tian continued his advance, intending to take Xiang Province from Emperor Xuan. Northern Zhou generals Heruo Dun (賀若敦) and Dugu Sheng (獨孤盛) led their troops against Hou, and Chen and Northern Zhou troops soon stalemated, and while initially, Hou was unable to make much progress against Heruo and Dugu, soon, problems with food supplies and illnesses caused Northern Zhou troops to be worn down. Around the new year 561, Dugu was forced to withdraw, putting Heruo under even greater pressure. By spring 561, Yin Liang (殷亮), who was defending Changsha, surrendered to Chen. Hou Tian then proposed to Heruo to let him withdraw peacefully. Heruo agreed and withdrew, and all of the territory previously taken from Xiao Zhuang were now in Chen hands, limiting Emperor Xuan's domain to the Jiangling region again.

Emperor Xuan, depressed that his territory was small and heavily damaged by warfare, soon began to suffer from a serious skin lesion on his back. He died in spring 562. Xiao Kui succeeded him (as Emperor Ming).

The historian Li Yanshou (李延寿), in his History of Northern Dynasties, had this to say about Emperor Xuan, both praising him and noting some of his idiosyncrasies:

Xiao Cha had great ambitions from his youth, and he was not bogged down with details. Although he often suspected others, he was gracious to his soldiers and received their loyalty. He did not drink and was content with frugal living. He served his mother with great filial piety, and did not preoccupy himself with feasting. He particularly disliked women, and even when they were several steps away from him, he would state that he could smell them. Any clothes he wore while having sexual contact with women would be discarded thereafter. After having sexual intercourse with a consort, he would have to take a day to recuperate. He also disliked seeing human hair, and his servants had to either wear turbans or hats so that their hairs would not be exposed.

Emperor Xuan wrote 15 scrolls' worth of literary works and 36 scrolls of commentary on Buddhist sutras.

== Era name ==
- Dading (大定 dà dìng) 555-562

== Family ==
=== Consorts and issue ===
- Empress Jing, of the Wang clan (靜皇后王氏, d. 563)
  - Xiao Liao, Crown Prince Xiaohui (孝惠太子 蕭嶚, d. 550), first son
- Consort Dowager Xiao, of the Cao clan (孝皇太妃曹氏, d. 562)
  - Xiao Kui, Emperor Ming (明帝蕭巋, 542 – 585), second son
- Unknown
  - Xiao Yan, Prince of Anping (安平王蕭巖, d. 588), third son
  - Xiao Ji, Prince Xiao of Dongping (东平孝王蕭岌, d. 566), fourth son
  - Xiao Cen, Prince of Wu Commandery (吴郡王蕭岑), fifth son
  - Princess Xuancheng (宣成公主), first daughter
    - married Cai Yanshou (蔡延寿), second son of Cai Dabao (蔡大宝)

Regnal titles
Preceded by Emperor Yuan of Liang	Emperor of Liang Dynasty (Western); 555–562	Succeeded by Emperor Ming of Western Liang
Preceded by Emperor Yuan of Liang	Emperor of Western Liang; 555–562	Succeeded by Emperor Ming of Western Liang
Preceded by Xiao Zhuang (Prince of Yongjia)	Emperor of China (Hunan); 560–561	Succeeded by Emperor Wen of Chen
