= Xiao Cong =

Emperor of Western Liang from 585 to 587

Emperor Jing of Western Liang 西梁靖帝
- Duke of Liang 梁公; Duke of Ju 莒國公
- Reign: 585–587
- Predecessor: Xiao Kui
- Born: 558
- Died: 607 (aged 48–49)
Posthumous name
- Emperor Xiaojing 孝靖皇帝
- Father: Xiao Kui

Emperor Jing of Western Liang ((西)梁靖帝, as later honored by Xiao Xi in 617), personal name Xiao Cong (蕭琮), courtesy name Wenwen (溫文), known during the Sui dynasty as the Duke of Ju (莒公), then Duke of Liang (梁公), was the final emperor of the Western Liang dynasty of China. He died c.September 607, by which time he was at least into middle age. Both he and his father Emperor Ming heavily relied on the military support of the Sui. In 587, after Emperor Jing's uncle Xiao Yan (蕭巖) and brother Xiao Huan (蕭瓛), surrendered to the Chen dynasty after suspecting Sui intentions, Emperor Wen of Sui abolished the Western Liang throne, seized Western Liang territories, and made Emperor Jing one of his officials, thus ending the Western Liang dynasty.

== Background ==
(Xi) Western Liang Mingdi ((西)梁靖帝) or Western Liang Gong (梁公)
Family name:	Xiao (蕭)
Given name:	Cong (琮, cóng)
Posthumous name: (full)	Xiaojing (孝靖, Xiàojìng) literary meaning: "filial and meek"
Posthumous name: (short)	Jing (靖, Jìng) "meek"

It is not known when Xiao Cong was born, and his mother's name is also lost in history. All that is known about his birth is that he was either the oldest or the second son of his father Xiao Kui—although the fact that he was initially created the Prince of Dongyang, rather than crown prince, by his father suggests that he was the second son, not the oldest. (If that were the case, his older brother's name is lost to history.) In his youth, he was considered knowledgeable and free-spirited.

It is not known when Xiao Cong was created crown prince, but it must be before 583, when Emperor Ming sent him, as Western Liang's crown prince, to congratulate his suzerain Emperor Wen of Sui on moving his capital from the old city Chang'an to the nearby new capital of Daxing (大興). In 585, Emperor Ming died, and Xiao Cong succeeded to the throne (as Emperor Jing).

== Reign ==
In 585, Emperor Jing sent his general Qi Xin (戚昕) to attack the Chen dynasty's city of Gong'an (公安, in modern Jingzhou, Hubei), but Qi was unable to capture Gong'an and forced to withdraw.

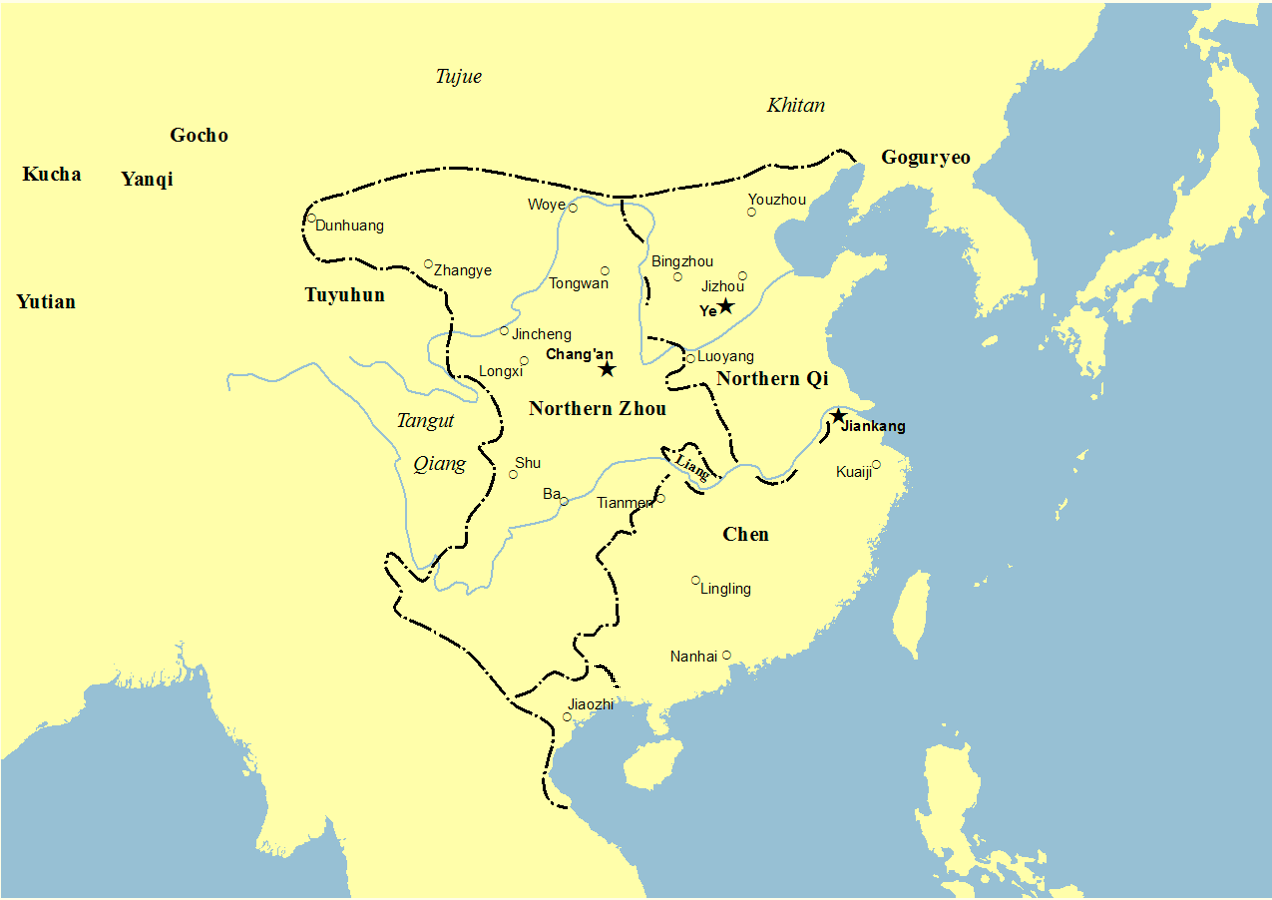
Map showing the location of Western Liang in 570

Also in 585, Sui's Emperor Wen, upon hearing that Emperor Jing's uncle Xiao Cen (蕭岑) the Prince of Wu Commandery was relying on his honored position and difficult to control, summoned Xiao Cen to Daxing and detained him there, although creating him the Duke of Huaiyi. Thereafter, Emperor Wen also reestablished the post of the Commandant of Jiangling (Western Liang's capital) and posted troops at Jiangling, effectively reasserting control over Western Liang. (Sui had withdrawn troops from Jiangling in 582, giving Emperor Ming more autonomy than before.) Perhaps because of this, Emperor Jing's general Xu Shiwu (許世武) secretly offered to submit to the Chen general Chen Huiji (陳慧紀) the Marquess of Yihuang (the cousin to Chen's emperor Chen Shubao), but Emperor Jing discovered Xu's plot and executed him.

In 587, Emperor Wen summoned Emperor Jing to Daxing to visit him. Emperor Jing led a train of some 200 officials, but as he was departing Jiangling, the people of Jiangling, believing that he would be detained and not be able to return, wept bitterly. Emperor Wen, claiming that he feared for Jiangling's safety in Emperor Jing's absence, sent his general Cui Hongdu (崔弘度) the Duke of Wuxiang to Jiangling. When Cui arrived in the nearby Ruo Province (鄀州, roughly modern Yichang, Hubei), Emperor Jing's uncle Xiao Yan and brother Xiao Huan, suspicious that Cui was instead planning to attack, sent the official Shen Jungong (沈君公, uncle of Chen Shubao's Empress Shen Wuhua) to Chen Huiji, offering to surrender. Chen Huiji quickly arrived at Jiangling, and Xiao Yan and Xiao Huan led the people of Jiangling in leaving the city and fleeing into Chen territory.

When Emperor Wen heard of this, he issued an edict abolishing Western Liang. He sent his official Gao Jiong to Jiangling to pacify the people who remained and to post guards to tend to the tombs of Emperor Ming and Emperor Ming's father Emperor Xuan. The former Emperor Jing was created the Duke of Ju.

== Under Sui dynasty ==
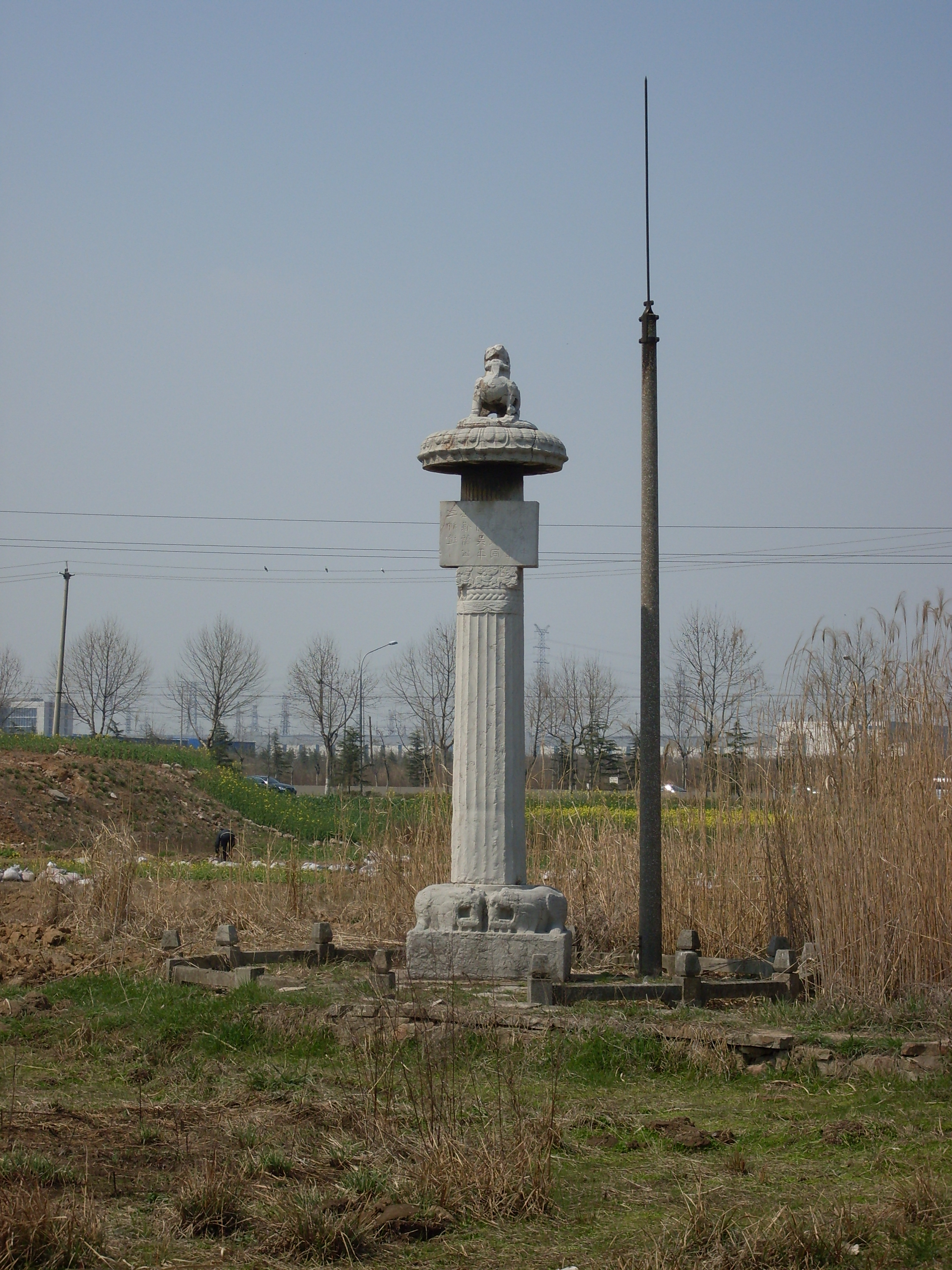
Tomb of Emperor Xiao Jing of the Western Liang may have been inspired by the Pillars of Ashoka.

Just two years later, in 589, Sui successfully conquered Chen, unifying China. In 594, Emperor Wen, citing the fact that the emperors of Northern Qi, Western Liang, and Chen were not being sacrificed, ordered that the former Northern Qi prince Gao Renying (高仁英), Chen Shubao, and Xiao Cong be given regular supplies so that they could make periodic sacrifices to their ancestors.

In 604, Emperor Wen died, and his son Yang Guang succeeded him (as Emperor Yang). As Emperor Yang's wife Empress Xiao was Xiao Cong's younger sister, Emperor Yang afforded Xiao Cong greater respect and changed his title from Duke of Ju to Duke of Liang. He also commissioned a number of Xiao Cong's relatives as officials. Xiao Cong himself was made a high-level official, but rarely carried out the duties of his office. When Emperor Yang sent the official Yang Yue (楊約), brother of the chancellor Yang Su, to try to encourage Xiao Cong to change his ways, Xiao Cong explained to Yang Yue, in veiled terms, that he did not want to draw attention to himself. Xiao Cong was also known for maintaining his own self-respect, and while he was living away from his ancestral lands, he refused to yield to the great clans of the north, and therefore offended a good number of northern nobles.

On 27 August 607, Emperor Yang killed a number of high-level officials—Gao Jiong, Heruo Bi (賀若弼), and Yuwen Bi (宇文弼), for criticizing his large rewards to the submissive Qimin Khan of Tujue. Xiao Cong had a deep friendship with Heruo, and therefore drew Emperor Yang's suspicions, and at the time, there was a popular song which included, in its lyrics, the line, "Xiao Xiao will rise again!" (The lyrics might have meant, "the recession will end.") This caused the superstitious Emperor Yang to suspect Xiao Cong further, and Xiao Cong was removed from his post. Eventually, he died at home without any offices. His year of death is not known. He might have been sonless, as his nephew Xiao Ju (蕭鉅) inherited the title of Duke of Liang. While it would be customary for dukes to receive posthumous names, Xiao Cong, if he received one from Sui, did not have one recorded in history. In 617, when Xiao Yan's grandson Xiao Xian rebelled against Sui rule and briefly reestablished Liang, he honored Xiao Cong as Emperor Jing.

== Era name ==
- Guangyun (廣運 guǎng yùn) 586–587

== Footnotes ==
Chinese royalty
Preceded by Emperor Ming of Western Liang	Emperor of Western Liang dynasty 585–587	Dynasty ended
Preceded by Emperor Ming of Western Liang	Emperor of China (Jiangling region); 585–587	Succeeded by Emperor Wen of Sui
