= Western Liang (555–587) =

Chinese imperial dynasty

Liang 梁
- 555–587 AD
- Western Liang and neighbors
- Status: Puppet state of Western Wei, Northern Zhou, and Sui dynasty Rump state of Liang dynasty (after 557)
- Capital: Jiangling
- Government: Monarchy
- Emperor
  - 555–562: Xiao Cha
  - 562–585: Xiao Kui
  - 585–587: Xiao Cong
- History
  - Established: 555
  - Disestablished: 587 AD
Preceded by	Succeeded by
Liang dynasty	Sui dynasty
- Today part of: China

Liang, (Note: Some historians consider Western Liang as a continuation of the Liang dynasty since it was founded by Xiao Cha (Emperor Xuan), a grandson of Xiao Yan (Emperor Wu), the founder of the Liang dynasty.) known in historiography as the Western Liang (Chinese: 西梁) or the Later Liang (Chinese: 後梁), was an imperial dynasty of China during the Northern and Southern dynasties era of Chinese history. Throughout its existence, it remained a puppet state of the Western Wei, Northern Zhou and Sui dynasties. The Western Liang dynasty was ruled by members of the same imperial house, the Xiao clan of Lanling, as the Liang dynasty. It was located in the middle Yangtze region in today's central Hubei province.

The Western Liang's founding emperor, Xiao Cha (Emperor Xuan), was a grandson of the Liang dynasty founder Emperor Wu of Liang. As a result, Western Liang is usually considered a rump state of the Liang dynasty after 557 AD. Between 555 AD and 557 AD the two states claiming the political orthodoxy of the Liang dynasty existed simultaneously: Xiao Cha ruled from Jiangling, while Xiao Yuanming and Xiao Fangzhi ruled from Jiankang. Before 555 AD, Emperor Yuan of Liang also ruled from Jiangling before he was captured and executed by Xiao Cha and his Western Wei backers. However, he is considered a Liang dynasty emperor rather than a Western Liang emperor because, among other things, he controlled a much larger territory, at least nominally.

The Western Liang had three emperors: Xiao Cha (Emperor Xuan), Xiao Kui (Emperor Ming), and Xiao Cong (Emperor Jing). From 617 to 621 AD, when the Sui dynasty collapsed, Xiao Cha's great-grandson Xiao Xian occupied the former Western Liang territory as well as others and proclaimed himself King of Liang, but his short-lived state is usually considered separate.

== Emperors ==
Personal name	Temple name	Posthumous name	Era name	Period of reign
Convention: Xi Liang + posthumous name
Xiao Cha (蕭詧; Xiāo Chá)	Zhongzong (中宗; Zhōngzōng)	Emperor Xuan (宣皇帝)	Dading (大定; Dàdìng)	555-562
Xiao Kui (蕭巋; Xiāo Kuī)	Shizong (世宗; Shìzōng)	Emperor Xiaoming (孝明皇帝)	Tianbao (天保; Tiānbǎo)	562-585
Xiao Cong (蕭琮; Xiāo Cóng)	None	Emperor Xiaojing (孝靖皇帝)	Guangyun (廣運; Guǎngyùn)	585-587
