= Liang dynasty =

China's Southern Dynasties (502–557)

Liang 梁
- 502–557 AD
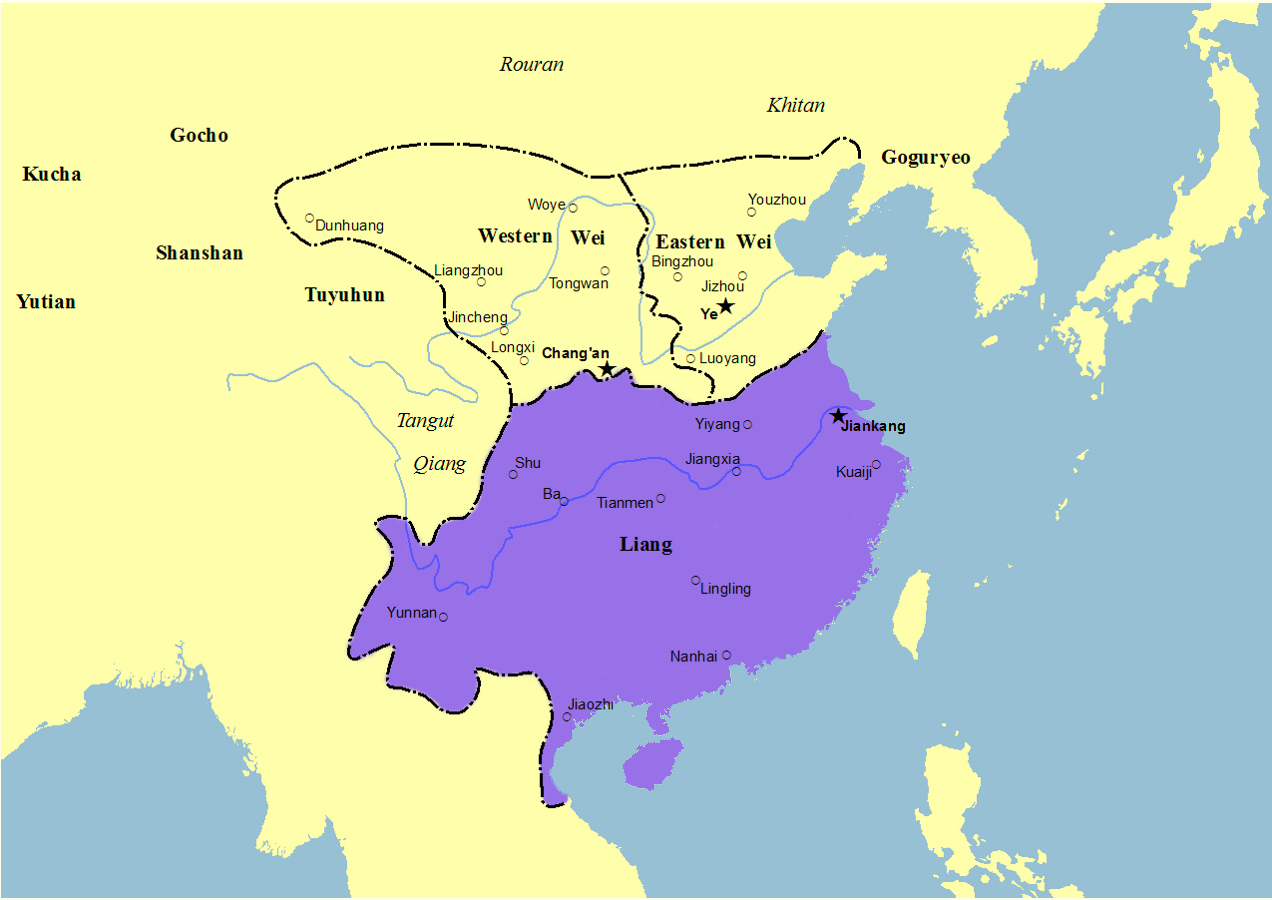
- Liang alongside Western Wei and Eastern Wei after 534.
- Capital: Jiankang (502–552, 555–557); Jiangling (552–555)
- Government: Monarchy
- Emperor
  - 502–549: Emperor Wu of Liang
  - 549–551: Emperor Jianwen of Liang
  - 552–555: Emperor Yuan of Liang
  - 555–557: Emperor Jing of Liang
- History
  - Established: 30 April 502
  - Jiankang's fall to Hou Jing: 24 April 549
  - Jiangling's fall to Western Wei: 7 January 555
  - Emperor Jing's yielding the throne to Chen Baxian: 16 November 557
  - Disestablished: 16 November 557 AD
- Currency: Chinese cash coins (Taiqing Fengle cash coins)
Preceded by
Southern Qi
Succeeded by
Chen dynasty
Northern Qi
Western Wei
Western Liang (555–587)
- Today part of: China; Vietnam

The Liang dynasty (Chinese: 梁朝; pinyin: Liáng Cháo), alternatively known as the Southern Liang (Chinese: 南梁; pinyin: Nán Liáng) or Xiao Liang (Chinese: 蕭梁; pinyin: Xiāo Liáng) in historiography, was an imperial dynasty of China and the third of the four Southern dynasties during the Northern and Southern dynasties period. It was preceded by the Southern Qi dynasty and succeeded by the Chen dynasty. The rump state of Western Liang existed until it was conquered in 587 AD by the Sui dynasty.

== Rule ==
Southern Liang in 509 AD with Northern Wei pictured in grey

The Liang dynasty began when Xiao Yan, a Southern Qi royal and general usurped the throne of Emperor He in 502. During the Liang dynasty, in 547 a Persian embassy paid tribute to the Liang, amber was recorded as originating from Persia by the Book of Liang.

In 548, the Prince of Henan Hou Jing started a rebellion with Xiao Zhengde, the Prince of Linhe, nephew and a former heir of the Emperor Wu of Liang, and installed Xiao Zhengde as emperor. In 549, Hou sacked Jiankang, deposed and killed Xiao Zhengde, seized power and put Emperor Wu effectively under house arrest. He dismissed the armies opposed to him in the name of Emperor Wu. In 549, Emperor Wu died; Emperor Wu's third son Crown Prince Gang (the later Emperor Jianwen) then ascended the throne under Hou's shadow; Emperor Jianwen was also effectively under house arrest. Hou also attempted to suppress those who would not submit to him.

At the same time the Liang princes fought with each other rather than try to eliminate Hou: Emperor Wu's seventh son Xiao Yi Prince of Xiangdong killed his nephew Xiao Yu the Prince of Hedong, forcing Xiao Yu's younger brother Xiao Cha Prince of Yueyang to surrender to the Western Wei; Xiao Yi also attacked his sixth brother Xiao Guan Prince of Shaoling, forcing him to surrender to Northern Qi. Both Xiao Cha and Xiao Guan were created Prince of Liang. However, as Xiao Yi also allied with Northern Qi, Northern Qi gave up their support of Xiao Guan; Xiao Guan was defeated by Hou and finally killed by Western Wei. Xiao Ji the Prince of Wuling the youngest son of Emperor Wu claimed imperial title.

In 551, Hou forced Emperor Jianwen to abdicate to his grandnephew Xiao Dong the Prince of Yuzhang, then killed Emperor Jianwen and forced Xiao Dong to abdicate to him. Hou established a new dynasty named Han. In 552, Xiao Yi destroyed Han and claimed the imperial title as Emperor Yuan of Liang. He also ordered his subordinates to kill Xiao Dong and Xiao Dong's younger brothers. He created his headquarter Jiangling capital instead of returning to Jiankang. He also managed to eliminate Xiao Ji, but in order to do this he allied with Western Wei, who in turn conquered Yi Province (Sichuan).

In 553, Northern Qi attacked Liang, aiming to install a nephew of Emperor Wu, Xiao Tui the Marquess of Xiangyin, as emperor, but was defeated.

As the relationship between Emperor Yuan and Western Wei was deteriorating, in 555, Western Wei army sacked Jiangling, forcing Emperor Yuan to surrender, and killed Emperor Yuan as well as his sons before installing Xiao Cha as emperor of (Western) Liang at Jiangling.

Liang generals led by Wang Sengbian declared Xiao Fangzhi Prince of Jin'an, the only living son of Emperor Yuan, as Prince of Liang at Jiankang, aiming to crown him the new emperor, but the Northern Qi army defeated them, forcing them into an agreement to recognise a nephew of Emperor Wu, Xiao Yuanming the Marquess of Zhenyang, as emperor instead. Wang requested that Xiao Fangzhi be created Crown Prince and Xiao Yuanming agreed. General Chen Baxian launched a raid that killed Wang in favor of Xiao Fangzhi while denouncing Wang for surrendering to Northern Qi. Xiao Yuanming was forced to abdicate to Xiao Fangzhi, who was known as Emperor Jing of Liang, and Chen seized power. He initially claimed Liang a subject of Northern Qi but later defeated the army of Northern Qi.

In 557, Chen Baxian established the new powerful Chen dynasty. Liang general Wang Lin also claimed Xiao Zhuang Prince of Yongjia grandson of Emperor Yuan emperor. In 560, the Chen dynasty defeated Xiao Zhuang who fled to the Northern Qi and was created Prince of Liang in 570. The small and weak Western Liang state existed until 587 when the Sui dynasty destroyed it.

In 617, Xiao Xian from Western Liang imperial clan claimed himself Liang Emperor in light of the disturbance in the end of Sui dynasty. His realm was destroyed by Tang dynasty in 621.

== Portraits of Periodical Offering of Liang ==
The Portraits of Periodical Offering of Liang by the Emperor Yuan of Liang, Xiao Yi, dated to the 6th century, is the earliest surviving of these specially significant paintings. They reflect foreign embassies that took place, particularly regarding the three Hephthalite (Hua) ambassadors, in 516–520 CE. The original of the work was lost, and the only surviving edition of this work was a copy from the Song dynasty in the 11th century, and is currently preserved at the National Museum of China. The original work consisted of at least twenty five portraits of ambassadors from their respectively country. The copy from the Song dynasty has twelve portraits and descriptions of thirteen envoys, with the envoy from Dangchang missing a portrait.

The envoys from right to left were: the Hephthalites (滑/嚈哒), Persia (波斯), Korea (百濟), Kucha (龜茲), Japan (倭), Malaysia (狼牙脩), Qiang (鄧至), Yarkand (周古柯), Kabadiyan (呵跋檀), Kumedh (胡蜜丹), Balkh (白題), and Mohe (末).

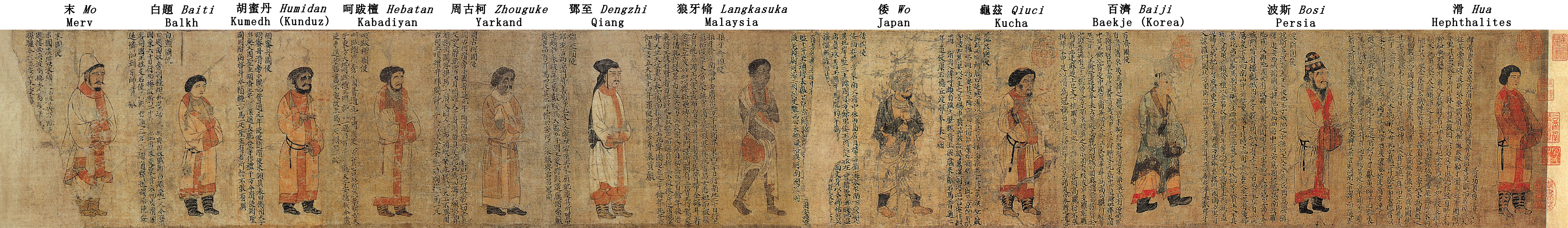
The Portraits of Periodical Offering of Liang with descriptions on the back of each ambassador. Song dynasty copy of Liang dynasty original from 526-539 CE, in the National Museum of China.

== Literature ==
The Liang is the best represented of the Northern and Southern Dynasties in terms of surviving written material. It was a period of brilliant literary accomplishments and produced important texts like the official histories of the Liu Song and Southern Qi dynasties, the literary anthology Wenxuan, the poetry anthology Yutai xinyong, the literary criticism works Wenxin diaolong and Shi pin, and Huang Kan's commentary on the Lunyu.

== Artistic heritage ==
Tombs of a number of members of the ruling Xiao family, with their sculptural ensembles, in various states of preservation, are located near Nanjing. The best surviving example of the Liang dynasty's monumental statuary is perhaps the ensemble of the Tomb of Xiao Xiu (475–518), a brother of Emperor Wu, located in Qixia District east of Nanjing.

Tombs of the Liang Dynasty

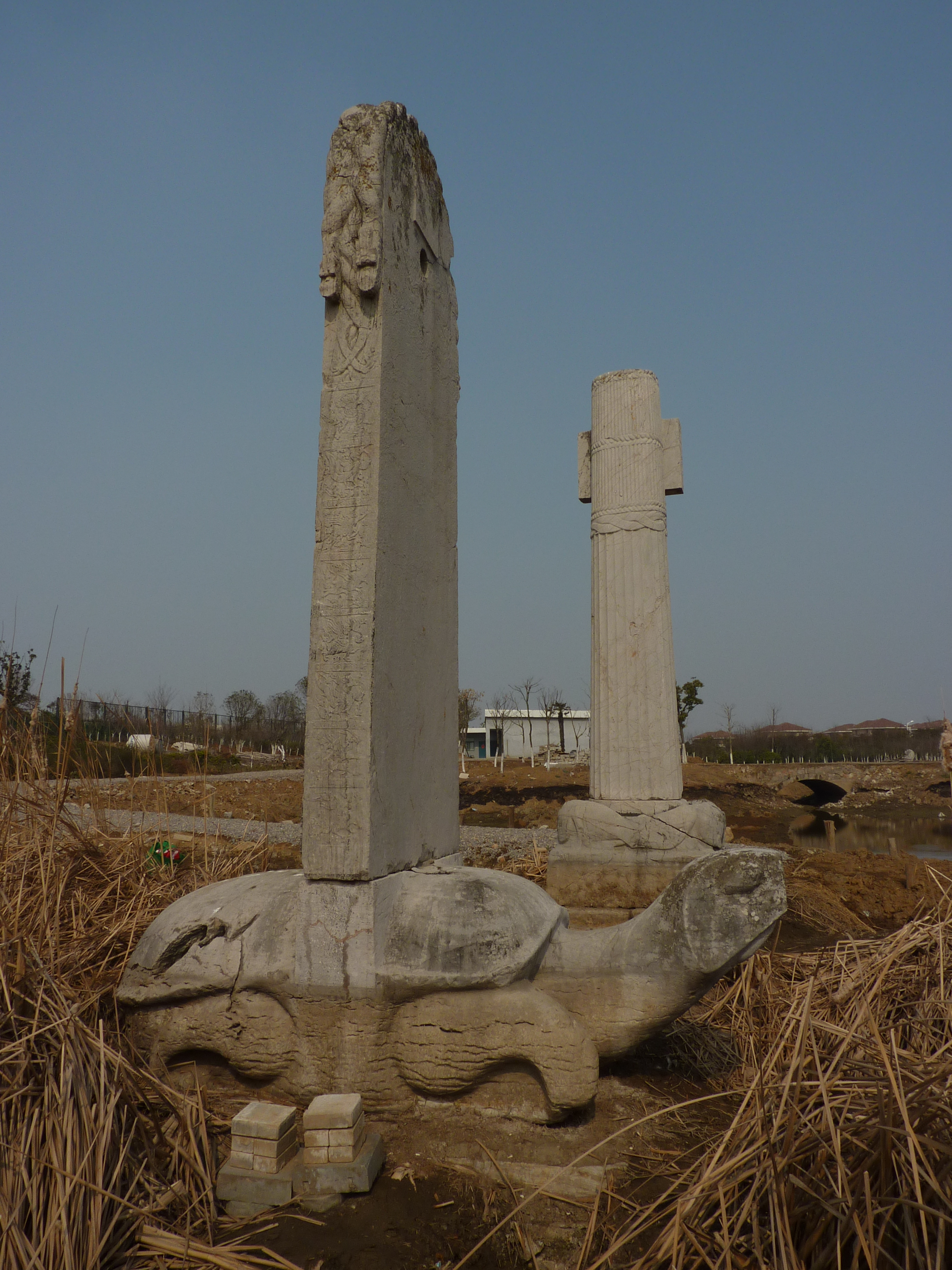
A turtle-borne stele and a pillar; tomb of Xiao Hong

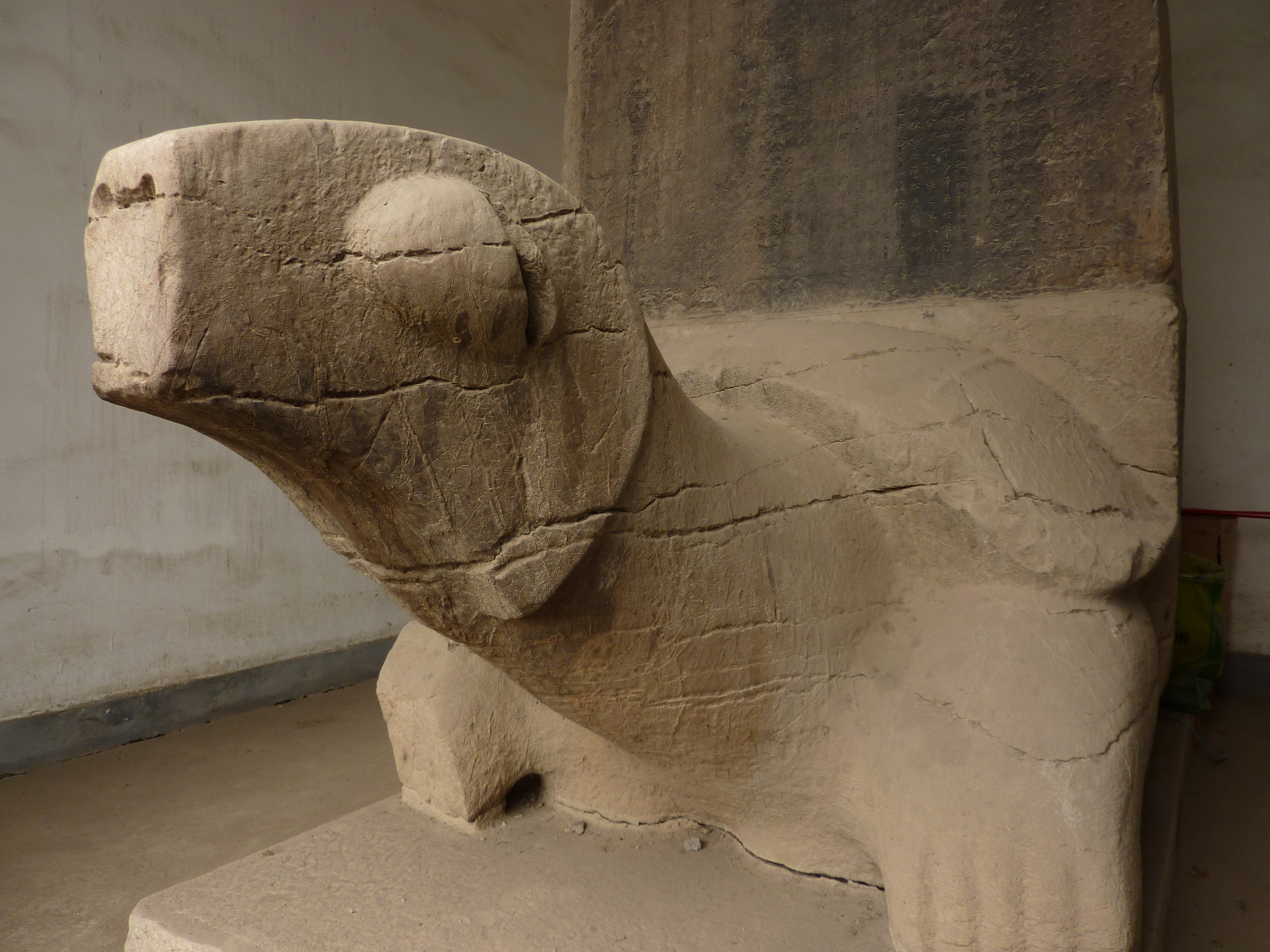
A turtle-borne stele; tomb of Xiao Dan

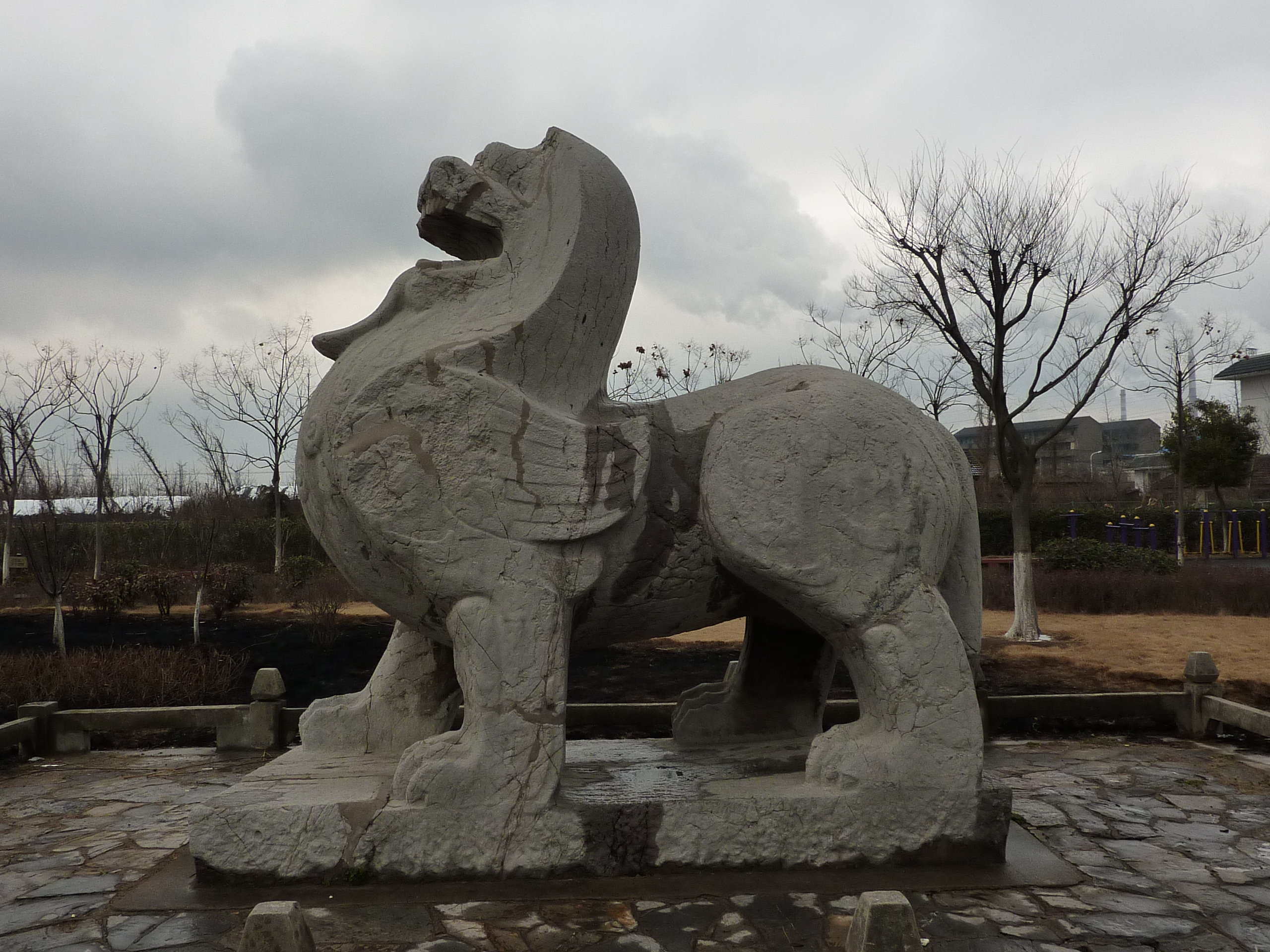
A bixie (winged lion); tomb of Xiao Hui

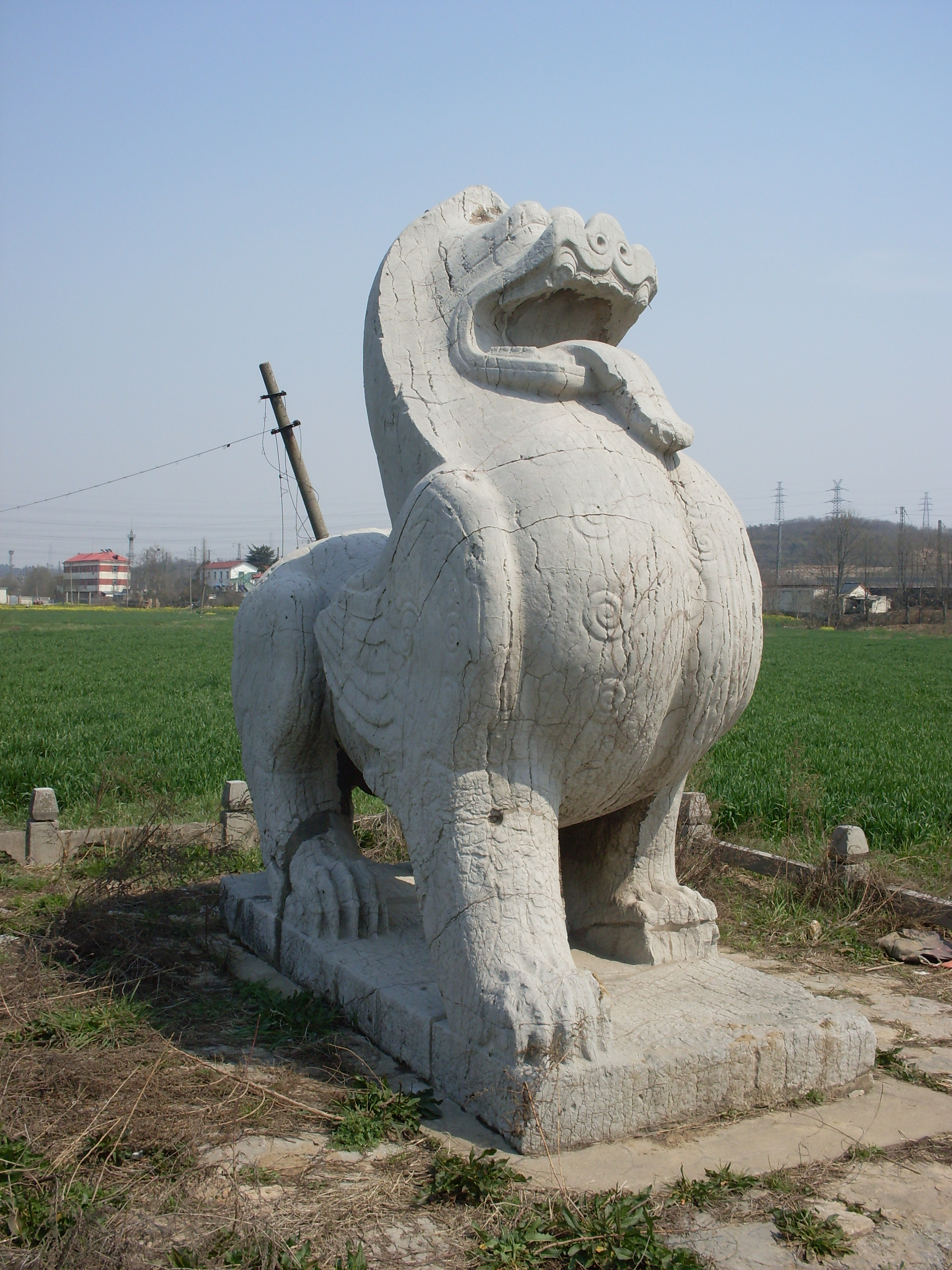
A bixie near the tomb of Xiao Jing, widely regarded as Nanjing's icon

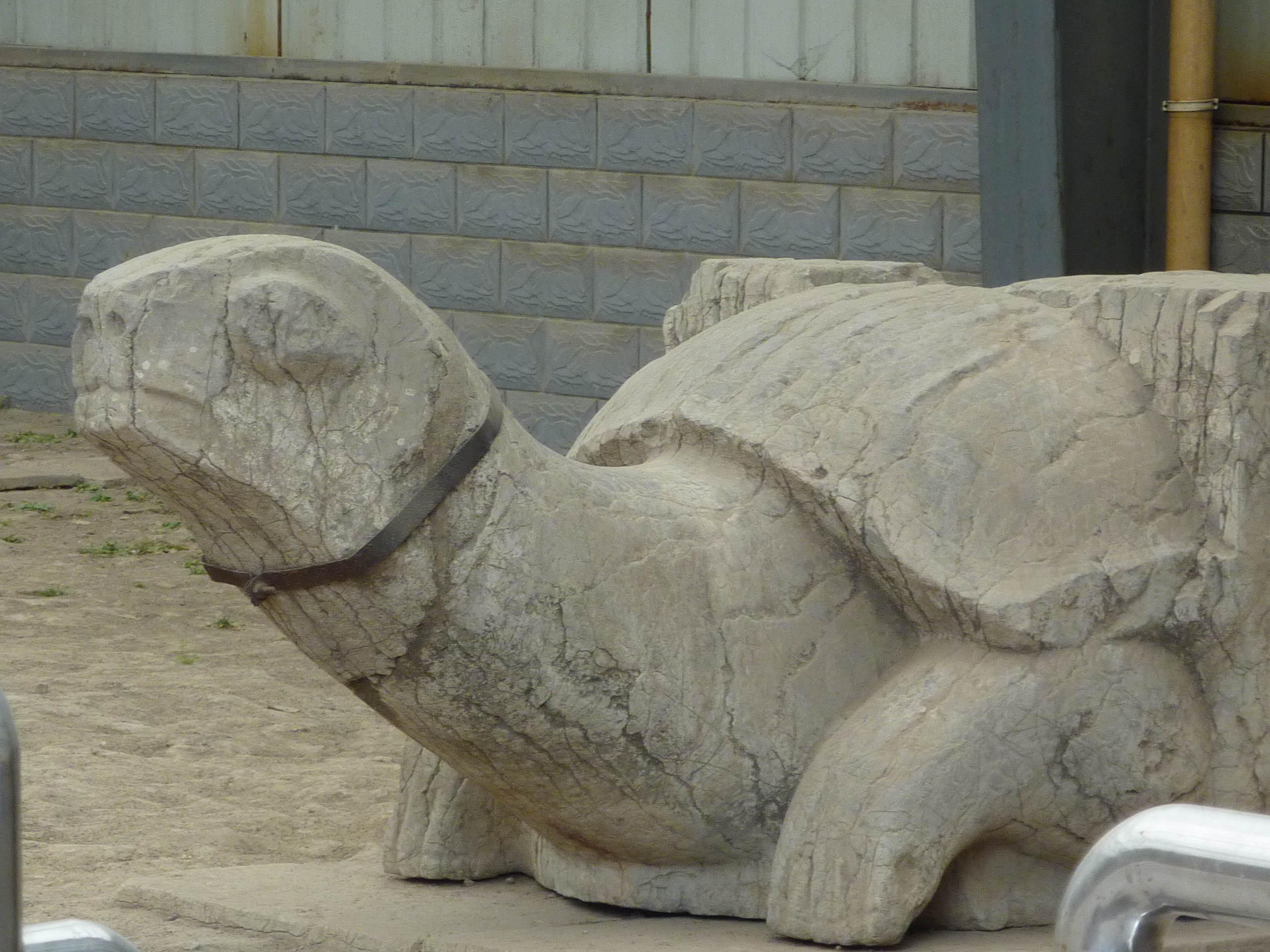
A stele-bearing turtle; tomb of Xiao Xiu

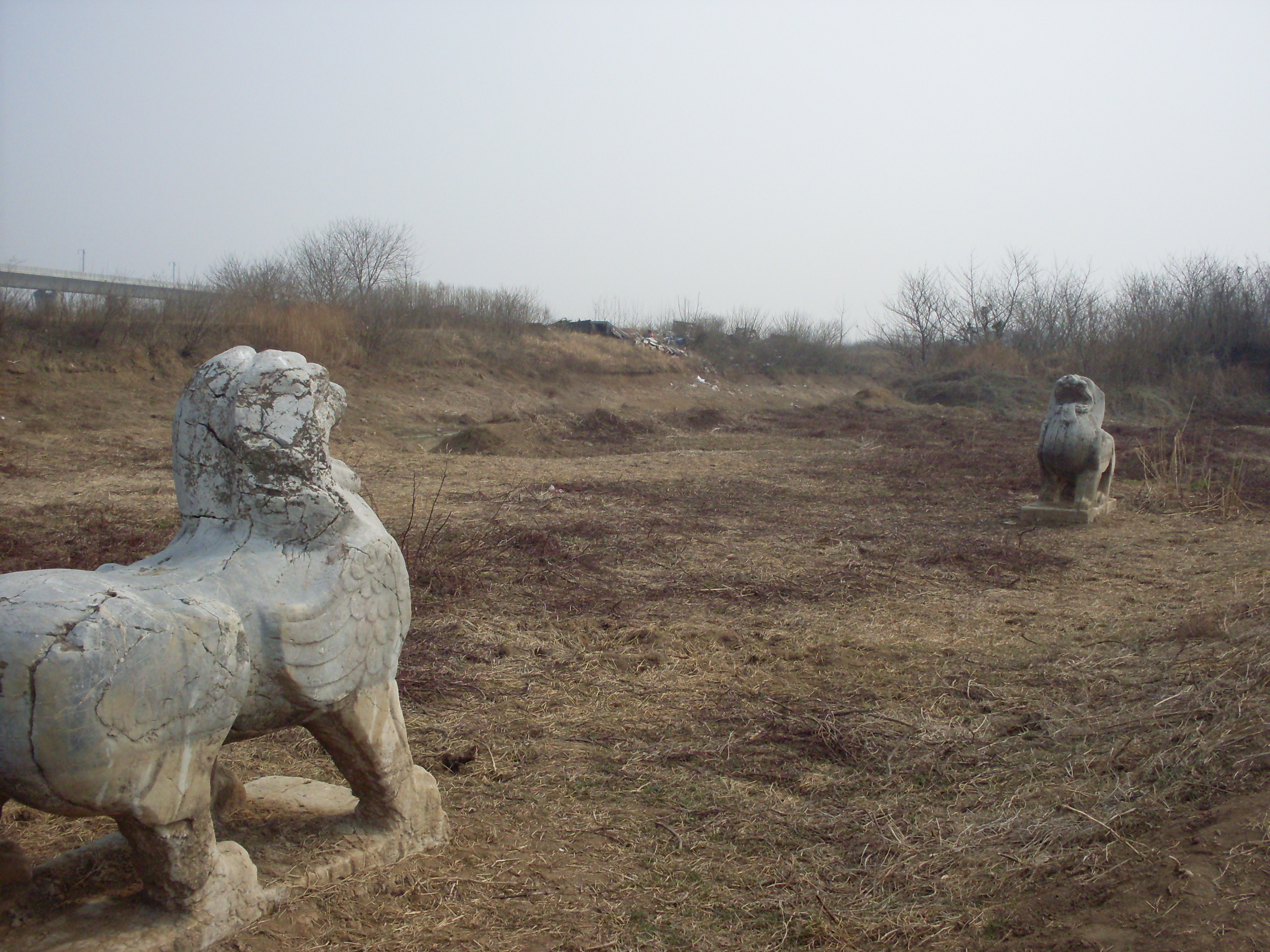
Two bixies near the tomb of Xiao Zhengli

== Emperors ==
Posthumous Name	Personal Name	Period of Reigns	Era names
Emperor Wu of Liang	Xiao Yan	502–549 (Note: Emperor Wu's nephew Xiao Zhengde the Prince of Linhe, who joined Hou Jing's rebellion, was declared emperor by Hou in 548, but after Hou's victory over Emperor Wu in 549 was deposed and killed by Hou, and is not usually considered a true emperor.)	Tianjian (天監) 502–519; Putong (普通) 520–527; Datong (大通) 527–529; Zhongdatong (中大通) 529–534; Datong (大同) 535–546; Zhongdatong (中大同) 546–547; Taiqing (太清) 547–549
Emperor Jianwen of Liang	Xiao Gang	549–551	Dabao (大寶) 550–551
–	Xiao Dong	551–552	Tianzheng (天正) 551-552
Emperor Yuan of Liang	Xiao Yi	552–555 (Note: Emperor Yuan's brother Xiao Ji the Prince of Wuling also declared himself emperor in 552, but was defeated and killed by Emperor Yuan in 553, and is usually not considered a true emperor.)	Chengsheng (承聖) 552–555
–	Xiao Yuanming	555	Tiancheng (天成) 555
Emperor Jing of Liang	Xiao Fangzhi	555–557 (Note: In 558, a year after Emperor Jing had yielded the throne to Chen Baxian (and had been killed by Chen), his nephew Xiao Zhuang the Prince of Yongjia, with support from Northern Qi, was proclaimed the emperor of Liang by the general Wang Lin. In 560, Wang Lin defeated the Chen troops, and both he and Xiao Zhuang were forced to flee to Northern Qi. It is a matter of controversy whether Xiao Zhuang should be considered an emperor of Liang.)	Shaotai (紹泰) 555–556; Taiping (太平) 556–557

=== Rulers' family tree ===
Liang dynasty and Western Liang

- Liang emperors

- Western Liang emperors

- Liang throne pretenders

Xiao Shunzhi 萧顺之
Xiao Yi 萧懿 (d. 500)	Xiao Yan 蕭衍; Wu (464–502-549)	Xiao Xiu 蕭秀; 475-518	Xiao Hong 蕭宏; 473-526
Xiao Yuanming 蕭淵明 d.556; r.555	Xiao Tong 萧统 (501-531)	Xiao Gang 蕭綱; Jianwen; 503-549-551	Xiao Yi 蕭繹; Yuan; 508–552-554-555	Xiao Ji 蕭紀; 508–552-553	Xiao Zhengde 蕭正德 d.549; r.548-549
Xiao Huan 萧欢	Xiao Cha 蕭詧; Xuan; 519-555-562	Xiao Daqi 蕭大器; 524–551	Xiao Fangdeng 蕭方等 (528-549)	Xiao Fangzhi 蕭方智; Jing; 543-555-557
Xiao Dong 萧栋 d.552; r.551	Xiao Kui 蕭巋; Ming; 542–562-585	Xiao Yan 蕭巖	Xiao Zhuang 蕭莊; 548-557-560-577?
Empress Xiao 蕭皇后 566?–648	Xiao Yu 蕭瑀; 574–647	Xiao Cong 蕭琮; Jing r.585-587	Xiao Xuan 萧璿
Xiao Xian 萧铣; 583-621; r.617–621

== See also ==
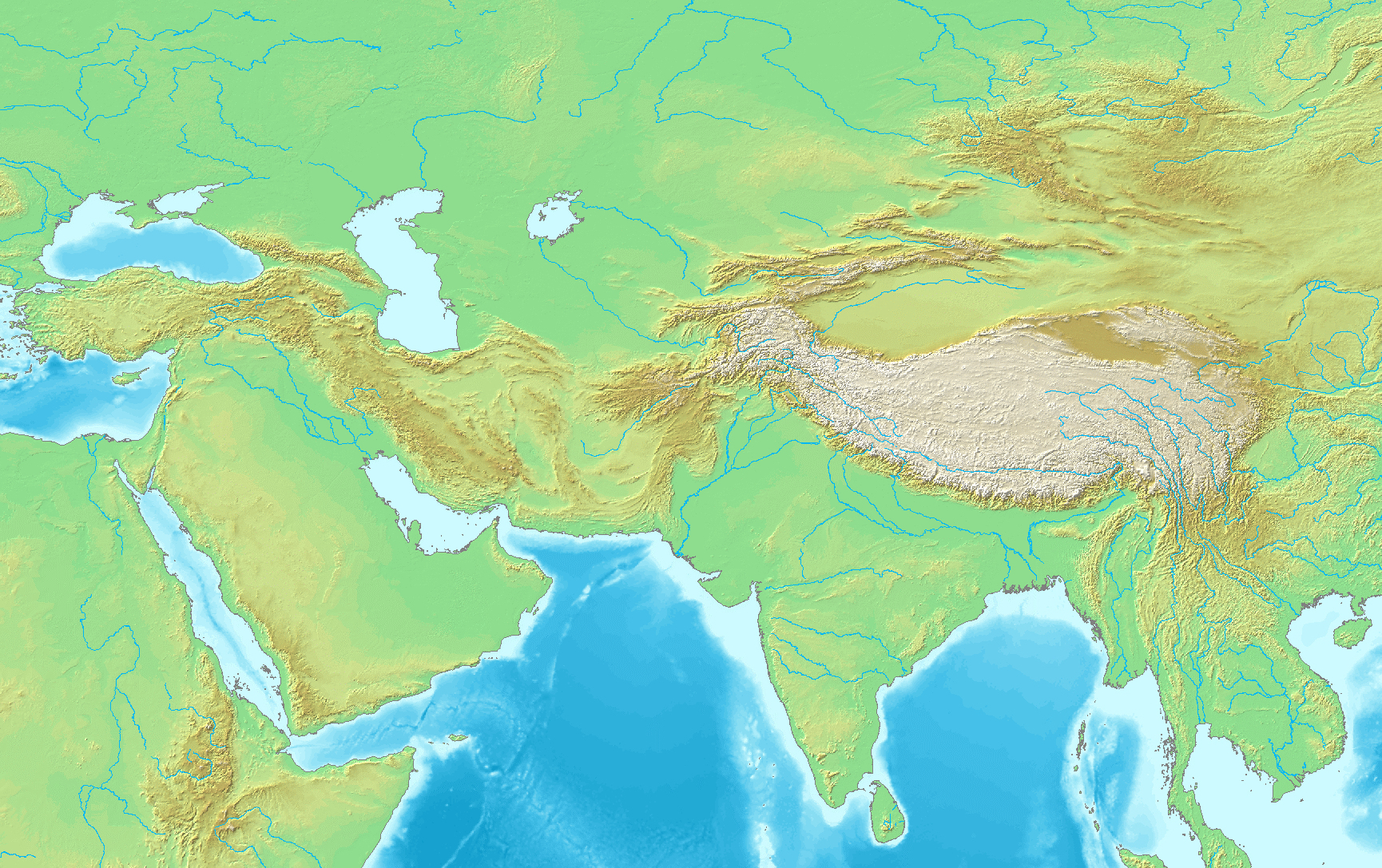
The Liang dynasty and contemporary Central, South and West Asian polities c. 500 CE.
- King of Liang
- Chen dynasty
- Book of Liang
- History of Northern Dynasties
- History of Southern Dynasties
- Zizhi Tongjian
