= Northern and Southern dynasties =

Period in Chinese history from 420 to 589

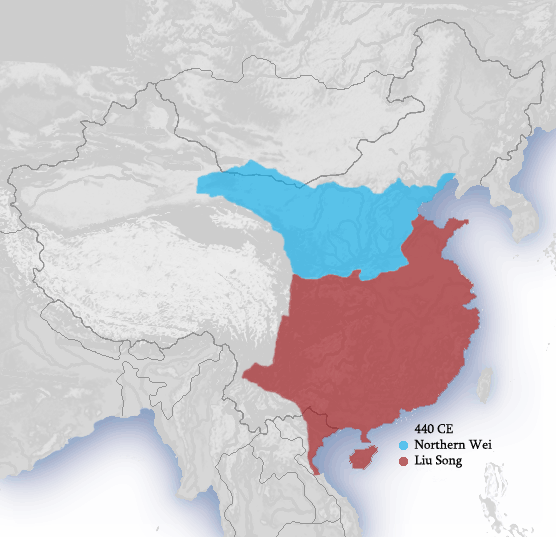
- Approximate territories of the Northern Wei dynasty (blue) and Liu Song dynasty (red) in 440

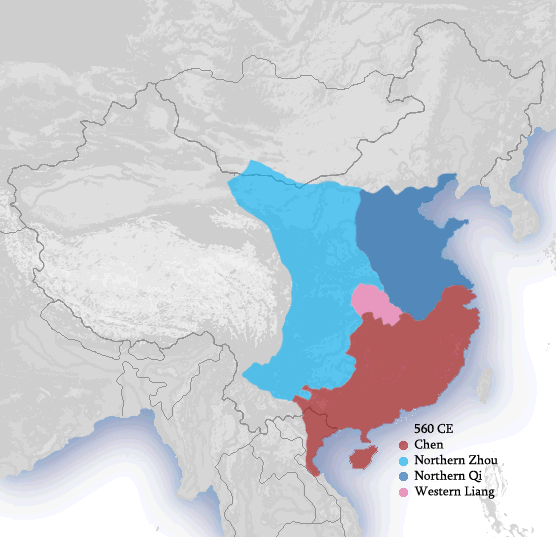
- Approximate territories of the Northern Qi dynasty (dark blue), Northern Zhou dynasty (light blue), Chen dynasty (red), and Western Liang dynasty (pink) in 560
- Chinese: 南北朝
Transcriptions
Standard Mandarin
- Hanyu Pinyin: Nán běi cháo
- Bopomofo: ㄋㄢˊ ㄅㄟˇ ㄔㄠˊ
- Wade–Giles: Nan^{2} pei^{3} ch'ao^{2}
- Tongyong Pinyin: Nán běi cháo
- IPA: [nǎn pèɪ ʈʂʰǎʊ]
Yue: Cantonese
- Yale Romanization: Naàhm Bāk Chìuh
- Jyutping: naam4 bak1 ciu4
- IPA: [nam˩ pɐk̚˥ tsʰiw˩]
Southern Min
- Tâi-lô: Lâm-pak-tiâu

Northern and Southern dynasties (420–589)
Northern dynasties		Southern dynasties	
Northern Wei 386–535		Liu Song 420–479	
Northern Wei 386–535		Southern Qi 479–502	
Northern Wei 386–535		Liang 502–557	
Western Wei; 535–557	Eastern Wei; 534–550	Liang 502–557	
Northern Zhou; 557–581	Northern Qi; 550–577	Chen; 557–589	Western Liang; 555–587

The Northern and Southern dynasties (Chinese: 南北朝; pinyin: Nán běi cháo) was a period of political division in the history of China that lasted from 420 to 589 AD, following the tumultuous era of the Sixteen Kingdoms and the Eastern Jin dynasty. It is sometimes considered to be the latter part of a longer period known as the Six Dynasties (220–589 AD). The period featured civil war and political chaos. However, it was also a time of flourishing arts and culture, advancement in technology, and the spread of Mahayana Buddhism and Taoism. The period saw large-scale migration of Han Chinese people to lands south of the Yangtze. It came to an end with the unification of China proper by Emperor Wen of the Sui dynasty in 589 AD.

During this period, the process of sinicization accelerated among the non-Han ethnicities in the north and the indigenous peoples in the south. This process was also accompanied by the increasing popularity of Buddhism in both northern and southern China. Daoism gained influence as well, with two essential Daoist canons written during this period. Additionally, many notable technological advances occurred during this period. The invention of the stirrup during the earlier Jin dynasty (266–420 AD) helped spur the development of heavy cavalry and their use in warfare. Historians also note advances in medicine, astronomy, mathematics, and cartography. Intellectuals of the period include the mathematician and astronomer Zu Chongzhi (429–500 AD), and astronomer Tao Hongjing (456–536 AD).

== Background ==
After the collapse of a unified China proper under the Eastern Han dynasty in 220, China moved into the Three Kingdoms period. Of these, the kingdom of Cao Wei was the strongest, followed by Eastern Wu and Shu Han. Initially, they were in a relatively stable formation. After a 249 coup by Sima Yi, the Sima family essentially controlled Cao Wei and the conquest of Shu Han by Cao Wei followed in late 263.

Following a failed coup by the ruling Cao family against the Sima family in June 260, the final Cao ruler abdicated in February 266. Sima Yan (Emperor Wu of Jin) then founded the Western Jin dynasty. The conquest of Eastern Wu by Western Jin occurred in 280, ending the Three Kingdoms period and reuniting China proper.

However, the Western Jin reunification was short-lived; the ascension of the developmentally disabled Emperor Hui of Jin gave rise to the War of the Eight Princes (291–306), a period when corruption was rampant and the ruling princes pitched their armies against one another for paramountcy over the empire. In the previous centuries, numerous nomadic tribal groups, collectively known in recent historiography as the Five Barbarians, were forcibly resettled in northern and northwestern China, either to serve as frontier auxiliaries or as farmhands. The civil wars of the Jin princes severely weakened the imperial military while famines and uprisings spread throughout the north, allowing the Five Barbarians to exploit the chaos and seize power. In 311, the Han-Zhao dynasty, founded by descendants of the Xiongnu people, sacked Luoyang and captured the Jin emperor in the Disaster of Yongjia. A similar fate met Chang'an in 316, and the last emperor of the Western Jin was soon put to death.

Amidst the calamity, a scion of the imperial house, Sima Rui (Emperor Yuan of Jin) was stationed south of the Huai River, where the situation was relatively stable and peaceful compared to the north. Many northern officials fled and found refuge in his domain. In 318, after the death of the last emperor, Sima Rui reestablished the dynasty at Jiankang, known in historiography as the Eastern Jin dynasty. As the Eastern Jin cemented their power in the south, the north remained tumultuous and gave way to numerous short-lived dynasties known as the Sixteen Kingdoms. Many of the Sixteen Kingdoms were founded by the Five Barbarians, though some were also established by the Han Chinese.

Very few of the Sixteen Kingdoms came close to unifying the north, and even the Former Qin dynasty that managed to do so in 376 swiftly disintegrated less than a decade after their defeat at the Battle of Feishui in 383. The Eastern Jin launched several expeditions to reclaim their loss territory, but fell short due to internal strife and conflicting interests among the ruling elites. Eventually, the commander, Liu Yu (Emperor Wu of Liu Song) ended the Eastern Jin after he seized the throne from Emperor Gong of Jin and founded the Liu Song dynasty in 420, officially beginning the Northern and Southern dynasties period. The Sixteen Kingdoms era also came to an end in 439, after the Northern Wei dynasty, founded by the Tuoba tribe of Xianbei ethnicity, conquered the last of the Sixteen Kingdoms and ruled over a unified northern China for roughly a century.

== Northern dynasties ==
The Northern dynasties began in 439 when the Northern Wei conquered the Northern Liang and united the north. It ended in 589 when the Sui dynasty conquered the Chen dynasty. It can be divided into three time periods — the Northern Wei, the Eastern and Western Weis, and the Northern Qi and Northern Zhou. The Northern, Eastern, and Western Weis as well as the Northern Zhou were established by the Xianbei people, while the Northern Qi was established by a Xianbei-influenced ethnic Han.

In the north, local ethnic Han gentry clans responded to the chaos by constructing fortified villages. These clans would then carve de facto fiefs out of these highly cohesive family-based self-defense communities. Lesser peasant families would work for the dominant clan as tenants or serfs. The chaos also allowed these Han gentry families to avoid government service before the Northern Wei court launched the sinicization movement. Northern gentry were therefore highly militarized as compared to their refined southern counterparts, and this distinction persisted well into the Sui and Tang dynasties centuries later.

=== Northern Wei (386–535) ===
==== Rise to power ====
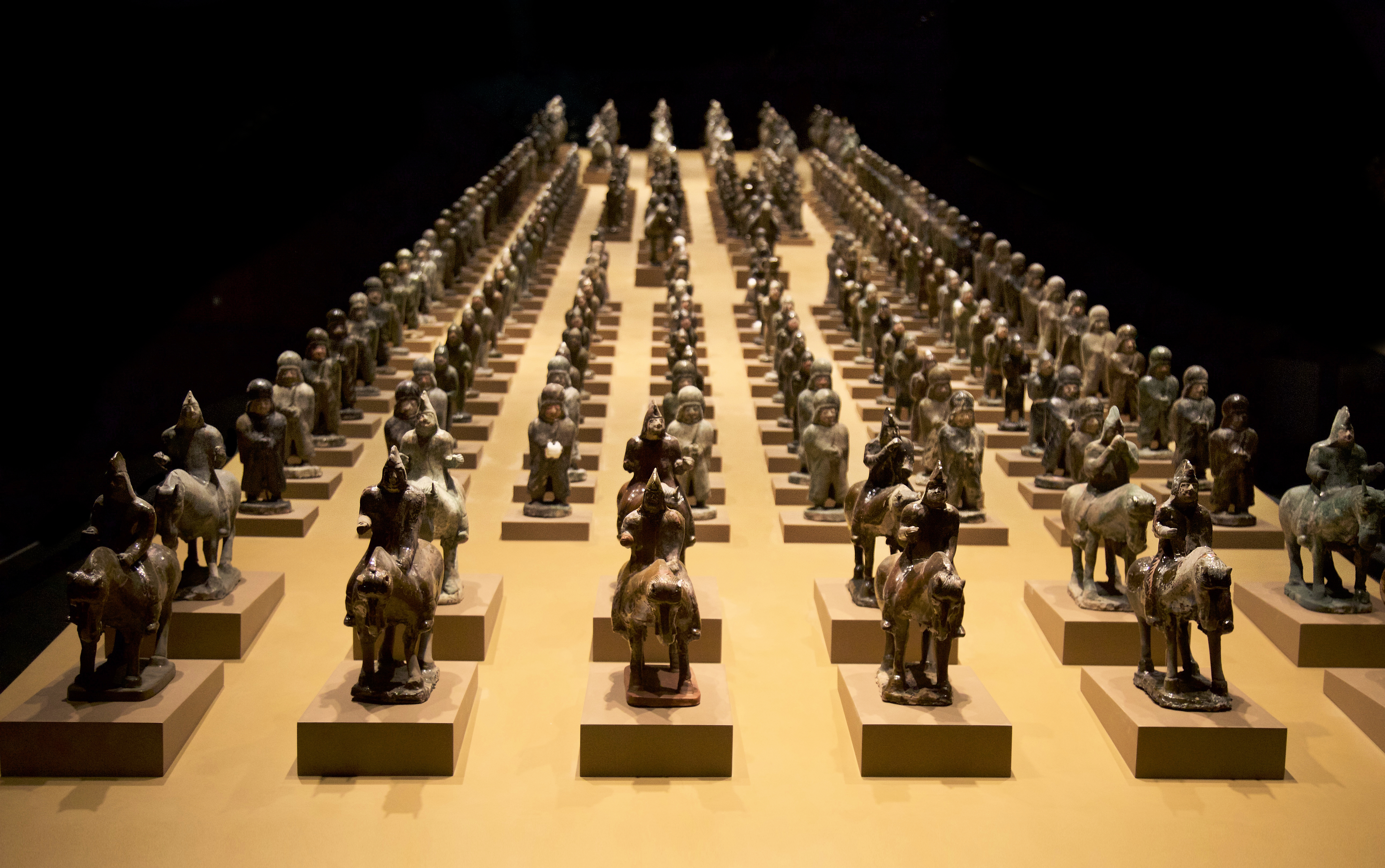
Army of Northern Wei terracotta soldiers in Xianbei uniform, tomb of Sima Jinlong, 484 CE.

During the Sixteen Kingdoms period, the Tuoba family of the Xianbei were the rulers of the kingdom of Dai. In their ambition to unify China, the Former Qin conquered the Dai in 376, but their empire soon collapsed after the disastrous defeat at the Battle of Fei River in 383. Tuoba Gui, the grandson of the last king of Dai, restored the fortunes of the Tuoba clan, renaming his state Wei (now known as Northern Wei) with its capital at Shengle (near modern-day Hohhot) in 386. His early reign saw him allied with the stronger Later Yan state, whose domain roughly encompassed Hebei and Liaoning. As Wei grew in power by annexing neighbouring tribes, their relations with Yan broke down and led to war. Tuoba Gui managed to repel a major Yan invasion in 395, and the following year, he launched his own invasion deep into Yan territory. The Yan splintered into two, and by 398, the Wei had occupied most of the Central Plains. Following this victory, Tuoba Gui moved his capital to Pingcheng (modern-day Datong), and in 399, he declared himself emperor, posthumously known as Emperor Daowu.

Under the rule of Emperors Daowu, Mingyuan, and Taiwu, the Northern Wei progressively expanded and consolidated their holdings. The establishment of the early Northern Wei state and the economy were also greatly indebted to the father-son pair of Cui Hong and Cui Hao. Due to Daowu's cruelty, he was killed by his son Tuoba Shao, but crown prince Tuoba Si managed to defeat Tuoba Shao and eventually took the throne as Emperor Mingyuan. Though he managed to conquer Liu Song's province of Henan, he died soon afterward. Mingyuan's son Tuoba Tao took the throne as Emperor Taiwu. Due to Taiwu's energetic efforts, Northern Wei's strength greatly increased, allowing them to repeatedly attack Liu Song. After dealing with the Rouran threat to his northern flank, he engaged in a war to unite northern China. With the fall of the Northern Liang in 439, Emperor Taiwu united northern China, ending the Sixteen Kingdoms period and beginning the Northern and Southern dynasties period with their southern rivals, the Liu Song.

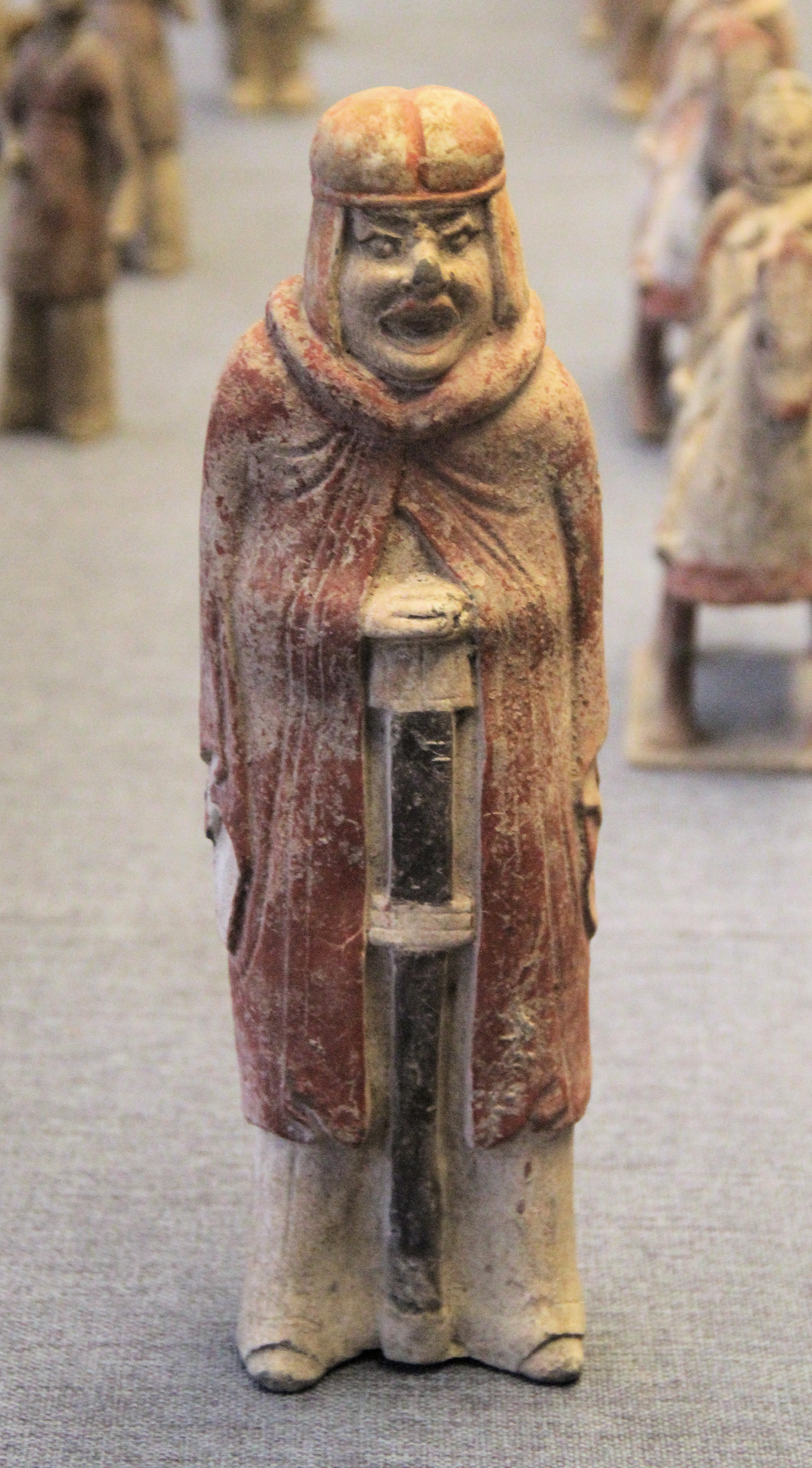
Northern Wei officer. Tomb statuette, Luoyang Museum.

Even though it was a time of great military strength for the Northern Wei, Rouran harassment from the north forced them to divert their focus from their southern expeditions. After uniting the north, Emperor Taiwu also conquered the powerful Shanshan kingdom and subjugated the other kingdoms in the Western Regions. In 450, Emperor Taiwu once again attacked the Liu Song and reached Guabu (modern-day Nanjing), threatening to cross the river to attack Jiankang, the Liu Song capital. Up until this point, the Northern Wei military forces had dominated the Liu Song forces. However, they took heavy casualties. The Northern Wei forces plundered numerous households before returning north.

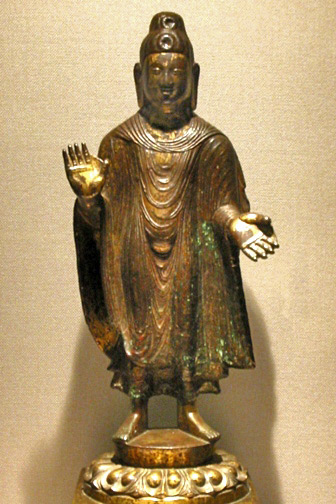
Northern Wei Buddha Maitreya gilt-bronze figurine, 443

At this point, followers of the Buddhist Gai Wu rebelled. After pacifying this rebellion, Emperor Taiwu, under the advice of his Daoist prime minister Cui Hao, proscribed Buddhism — the first of the persecutions of Chinese Buddhism known as the Three Disasters of Wu. At this late stage in his life, Emperor Taiwu meted out cruel punishments, which led to his death in 452 at the hands of the eunuch Zong Ai. His death sparked off turmoil that only ended with the ascension of Emperor Wencheng later that same year.

In the first half of the Northern Wei dynasty, the Xianbei steppe tribesmen who dominated northern China kept a policy of strict social distinction between them and their Han subjects. Ethnic Han were drafted into the bureaucracy, employed as officials for jobs such as collecting taxes. However, the Han were kept out of many higher positions of power. They also represented the minority of the populace where centers of power were located.

==== Reforms and Sinicization ====
Widespread social and cultural transformation in northern China came with Emperor Xiaowen, who reigned from 471–499. After Emperor Wencheng's relatively stable reign in 465, his Chinese wife, Empress Dowager Wenming seized the regency of his stepson, Emperor Xianwen and later her stepgrandson, Xiaowen. During her early regency of Xiaowen, her government passed several far-reaching reforms, the most influential of them being the introduction of the Equal-field system, which increased tax revenues and agricultural output, encouraging population growth while weakening the autonomy of the local aristocracy.

Following the Empress Dowager's death in 490, Emperor Xiaowen began to rule independently and continued his stepgrandmother's reformations to counter the growing power of the Xianbei military nobility. While his father was a Xianbei, his mother was a Han. Emperor Xiaowen asserted his dual Xianbei-Han identity, renaming his own clan from "Tuoba" (拓跋) to the Chinese surname of "Yuan" (元). In the year 493, he instituted a new sinification program that had the Xianbei elites conform to many Han standards. These social reforms included donning Han clothing (banning Xianbei clothing at court), learning the Han language (if under the age of thirty), converting Xianbei family names to one-character Han surnames, and encouraging high-ranking Xianbei and Han families to intermarry. Emperor Xiaowen also moved the capital city from Pingcheng to one of China's old imperial sites, Luoyang, which had been the capital during the earlier Eastern Han and Western Jin dynasties. The new capital at Luoyang was revived and transformed, with roughly 150,000 Xianbei and other northern warriors moved from the north to the south by the year 495 to serve in the capital. Within a couple of decades, the population had risen to about half a million residents and was famed for being home to over a thousand Buddhist temples. Defectors from the south, such as Wang Su of the prestigious Wang clan of Langya, were largely accommodated and felt at home with the establishment of their own Wu quarter in Luoyang (this quarter of the city was home to over three thousand families). They were even served tea (by this time gaining popularity in southern China) at court instead of the yogurt drinks commonly found in the north.

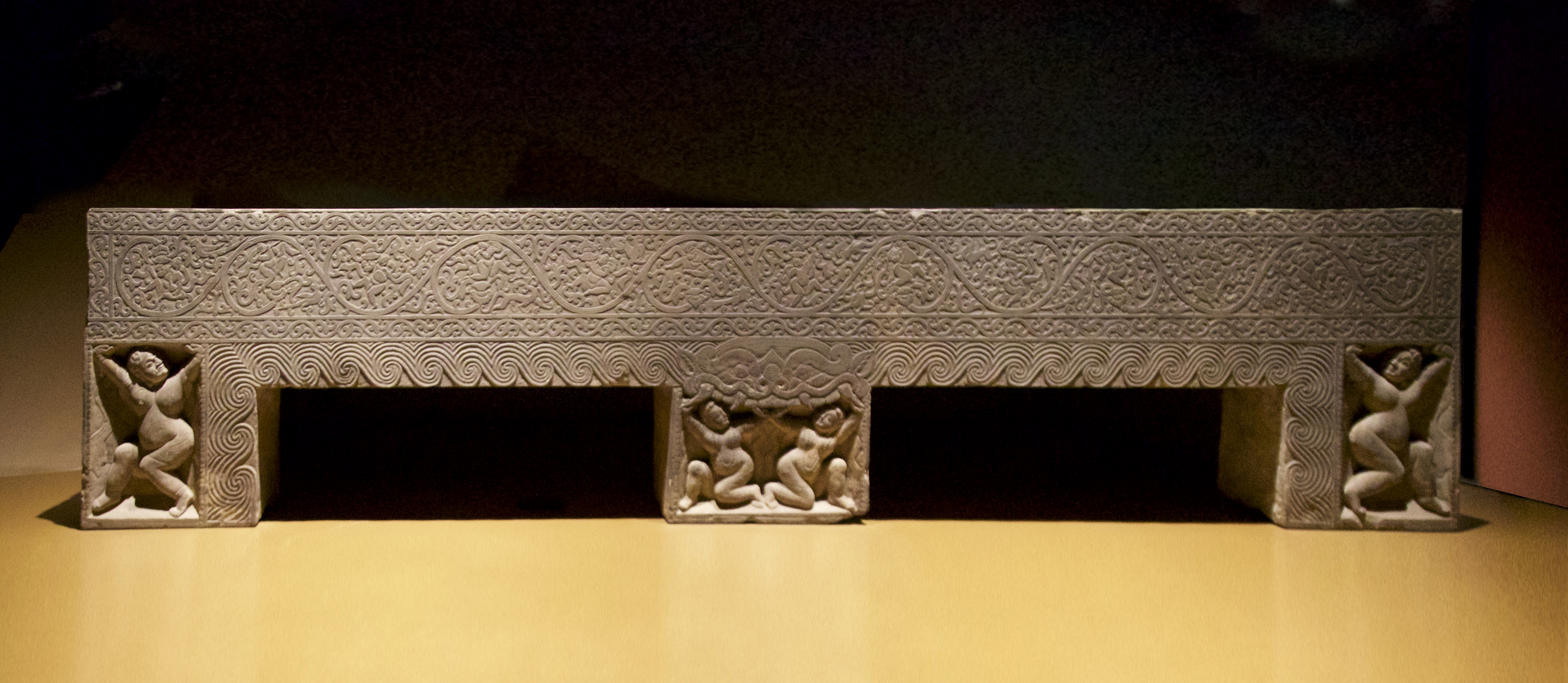
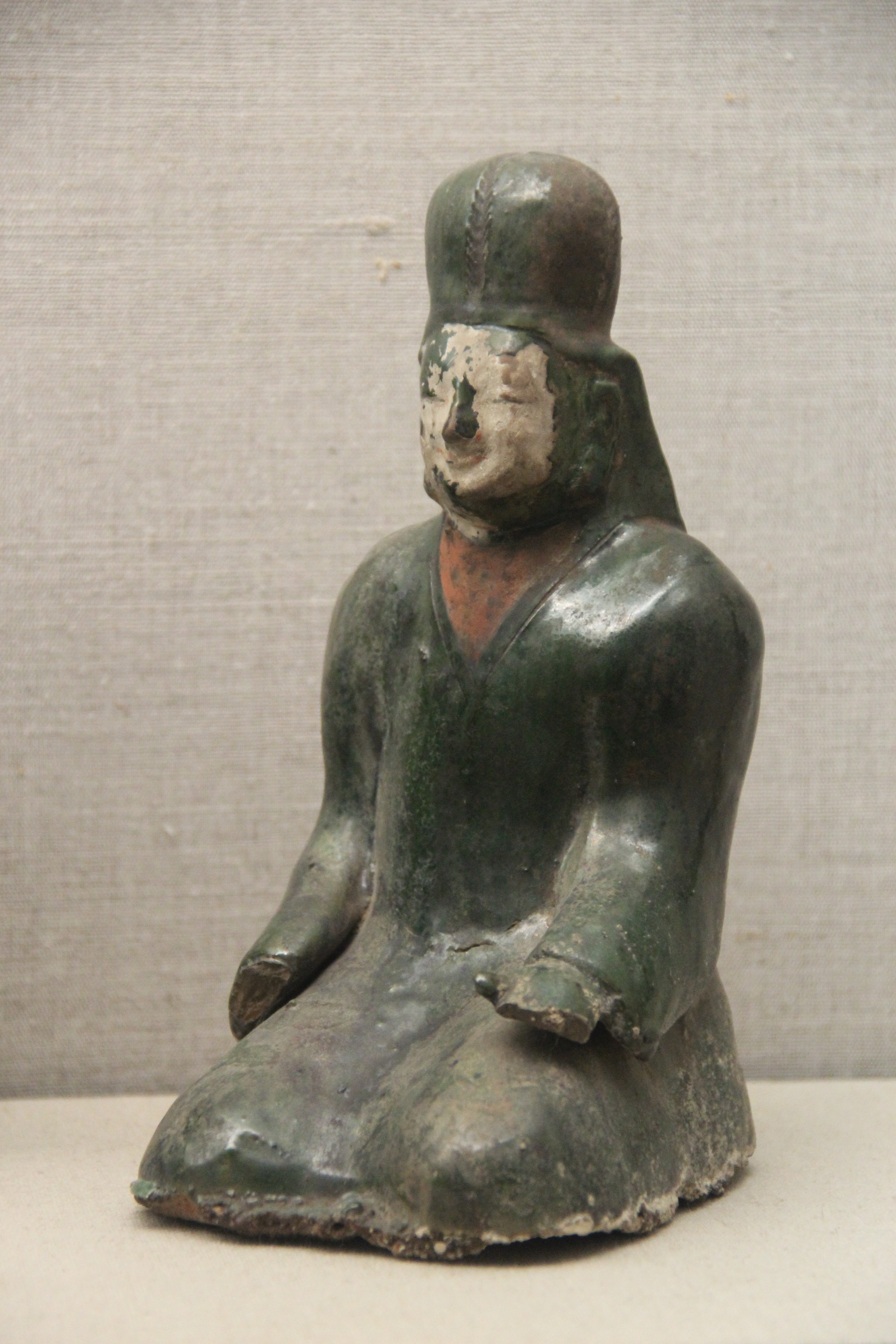
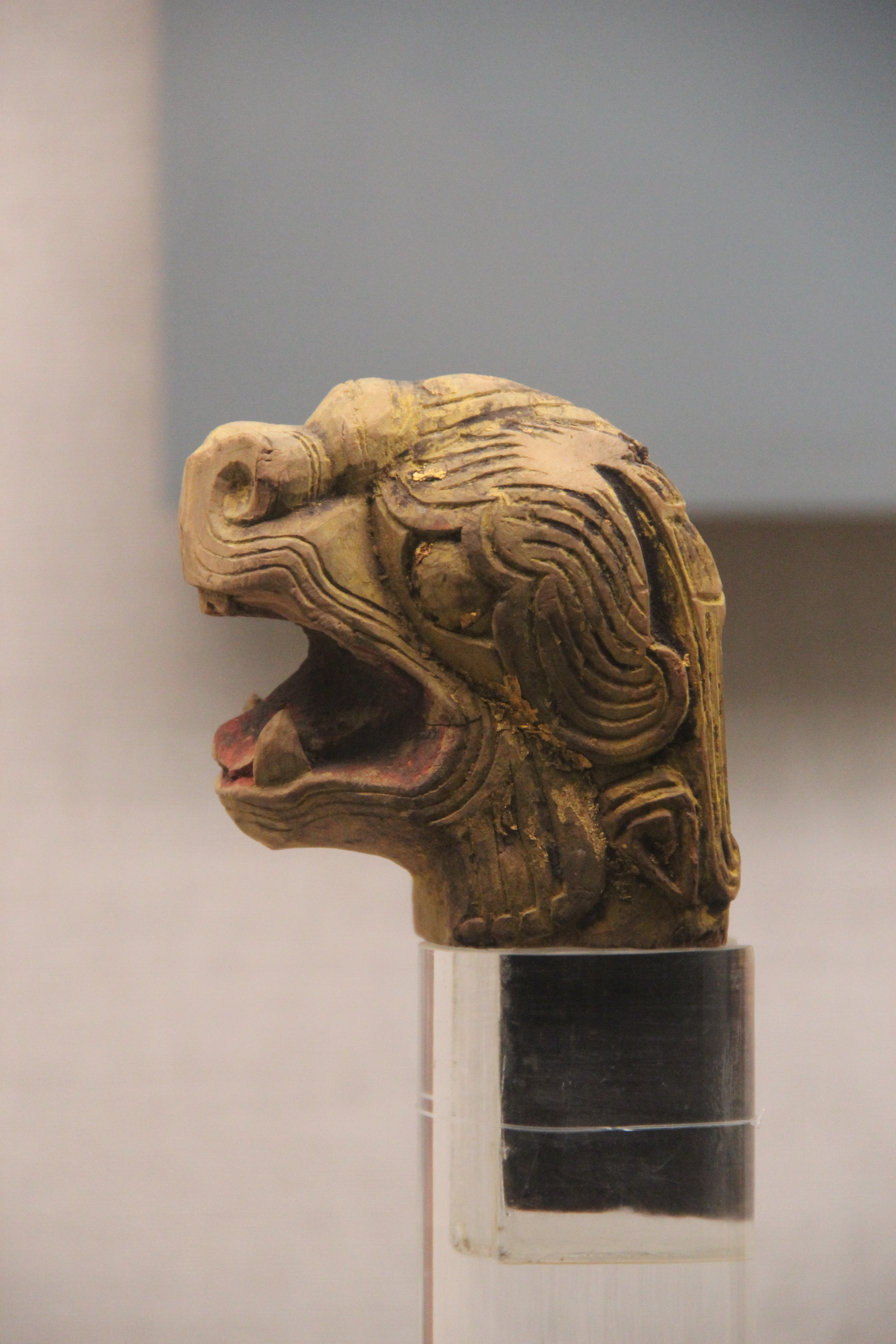
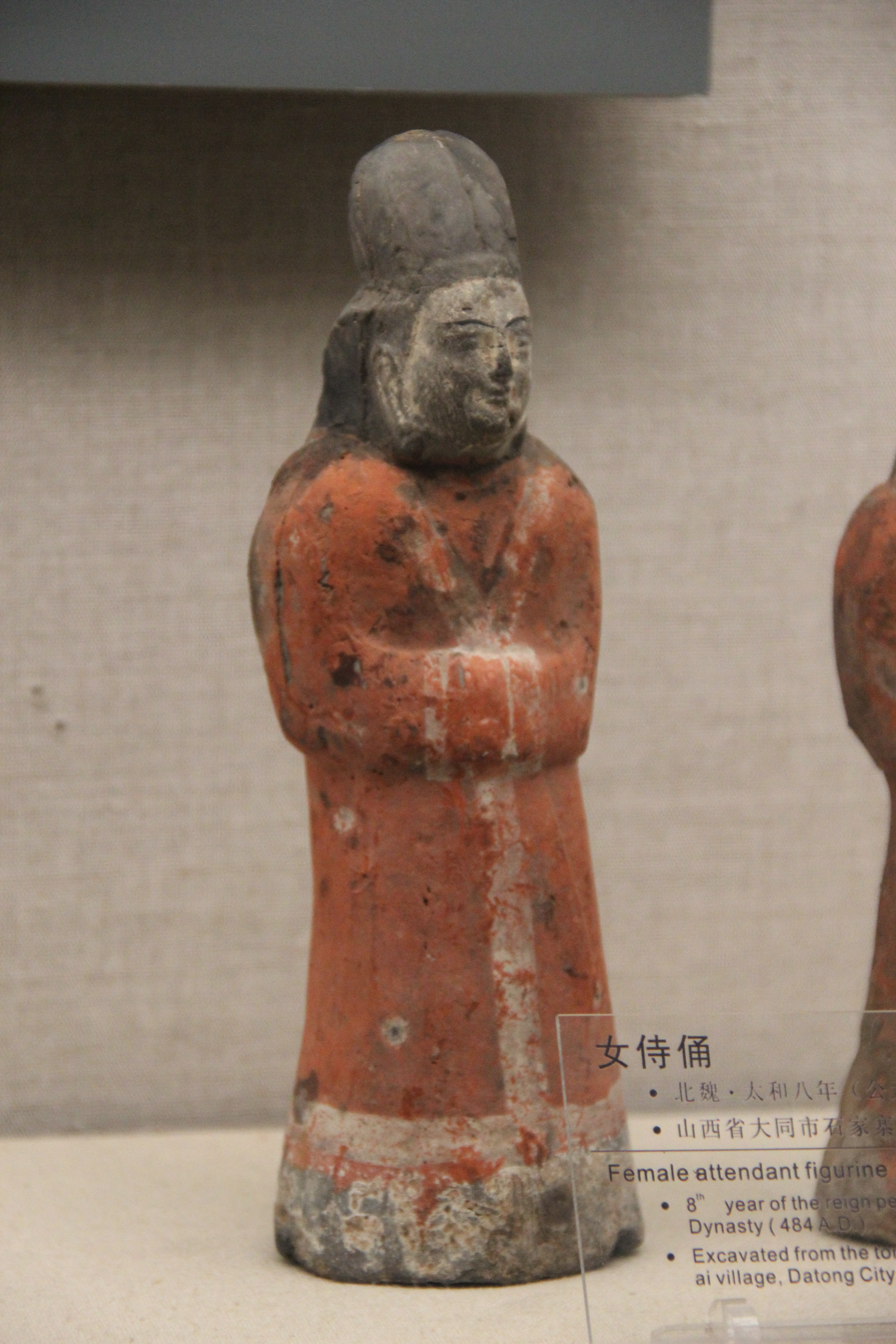
Tomb of Northern Wei General Sima Jinlong and some of its artefacts, 484 CE.

Beginning in the 480s, the Northern Wei arranged for Han elites to marry daughters of the Xianbei Tuoba imperial family. More than fifty per cent of Tuoba Xianbei princesses of the Northern Wei were married to southern Han men from the imperial families and aristocrats of the southern dynasties who had defected and moved north to join the Northern Wei. Several daughters of the Xianbei Emperor Xiaowen married Han elites: the Liu Song royal Liu Hui (刘辉), married Princess Lanling (蘭陵公主) of the Northern Wei, Princess Huayang (華陽公主) to Sima Fei (司馬朏), a descendant of Jin royalty, Princess Jinan (濟南公主) to Lu Daoqian (盧道虔), and Princess Nanyang (南阳长公主) to Xiao Baoyin, a member of Southern Qi royalty. Emperor Xiaozhuang of Northern Wei's sister, the Shouyang Princess, was wedded to Emperor Wu of Liang's son Xiao Zong. According to the Book of Zhou, Emperor Xiaowu of Northern Wei's sister was married to the ethnic Han Zhang Huan, son of Zhang Qiong. (Note: His name is given as Zhang Xin in the Book of Northern Qi and History of the Northern Dynasties which mention his marriage to a Xianbei princess of Wei. His personal name was changed due to a naming taboo on the emperor's name.) When the Eastern Jin dynasty ended, the Northern Wei received the Jin prince Sima Chuzhi as a refugee, and he married a Northern Wei princess. Their son Sima Jinlong in turn married Northern Liang Xiongnu King Juqu Mujian's daughter.

In the year 523, Prince Dongyang of the Northern Wei was sent to Dunhuang to serve as its governor for a term of fifteen years. With Buddhism gaining mainstream acceptance in Chinese society, Prince Dongyang and local wealthy families set out to establish a monumental project in honor of Buddhism, carving and decorating Cave 285 of the Mogao Caves with beautiful statues and murals. Such promotion of the arts would continue for centuries at Dunhuang and it is now one of China's greatest tourist attractions.

=== Split into Eastern Wei (534–550) and Western Wei (535–557) ===
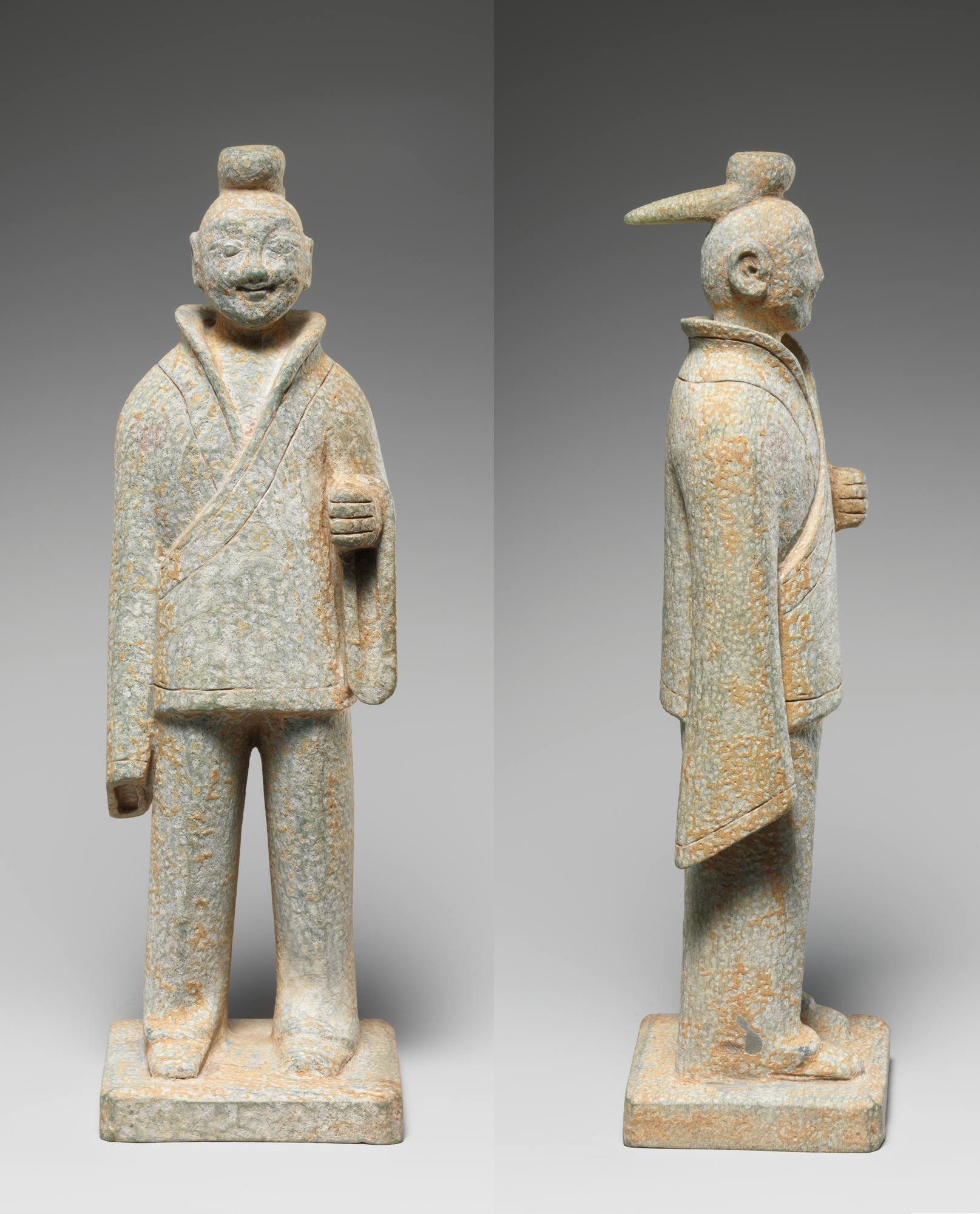
Civil officer, Western Wei, 535–557

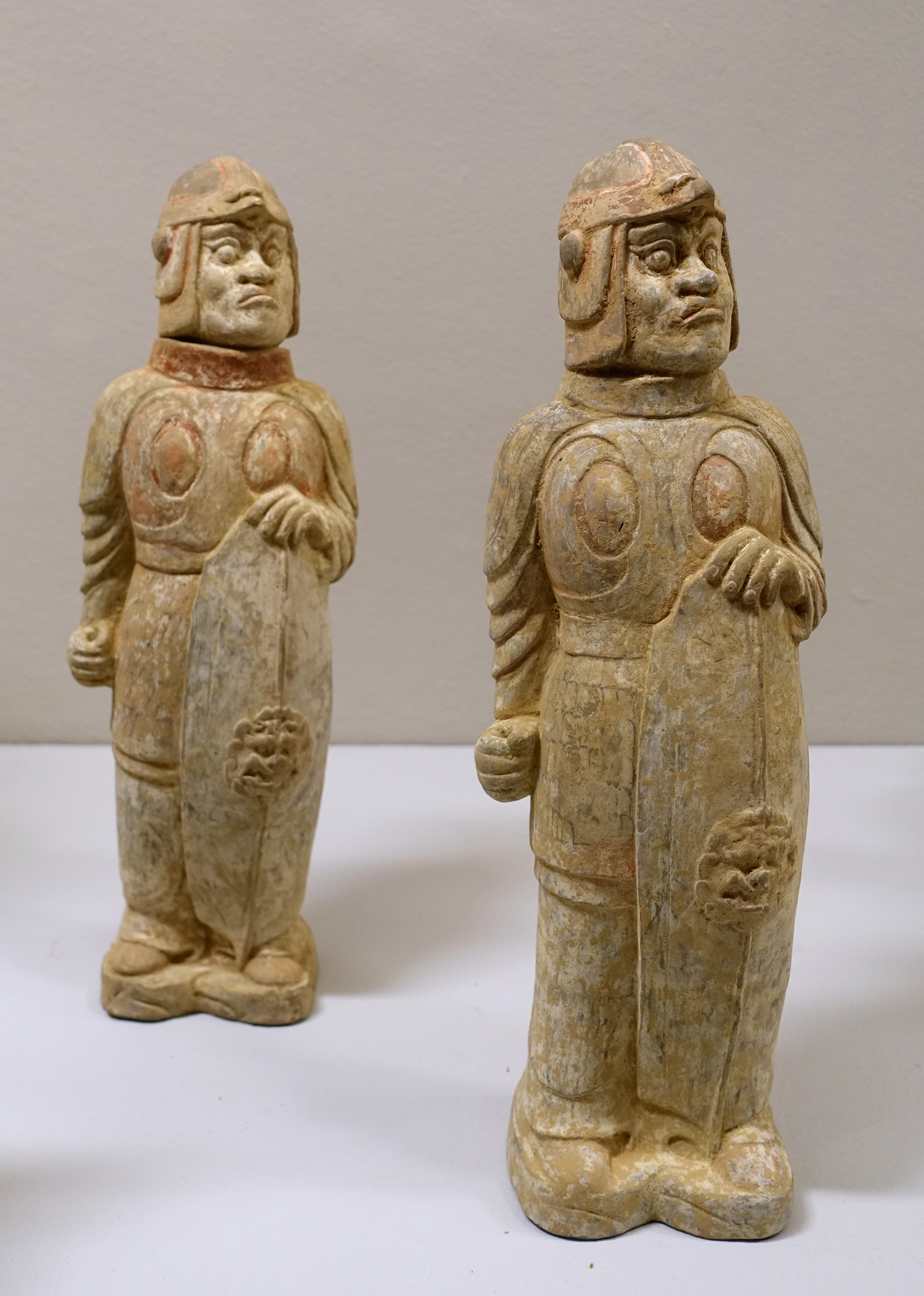
Soldiers, Eastern Wei, 534–550

In the year 523, a revolt of several military garrisons broke out and became known as the Rebellion of the Six Garrisons (Liu Zhen). The revolt was caused by a food shortage far north of Luoyang. After the rebel force was suppressed, the government had 200,000 surrendered garrison rebels deployed to Hebei, which proved later to be a mistake when a former garrison officer organized another rebellion in the years 526–527. The underlying cause of these wars was the growing rift between the governing aristocracy which was increasingly adopting Han-style sedentary policies and lifestyles and their nomadic tribal armies who continued to preserve the old steppe way of life.

The Northern Wei court was betrayed by one of their own generals, who had the empress dowager and the young emperor thrown into the Yellow River while establishing his own puppet ruler to maintain authority. As conflict swelled in the north between successive leaders, Gao Huan took control of the east and Luoyang (holding Emperor Xiaojing as a puppet ruler) by 534, while his rival Yuwen Tai took control of the west and the traditional Chinese capital of Chang'an by 535. The Western regime was dominated by the sinicized nobles and their Han bureaucrats while the Eastern regime was controlled by the traditional steppe tribes.

=== Northern Qi (550–577) and Northern Zhou (557–581) ===
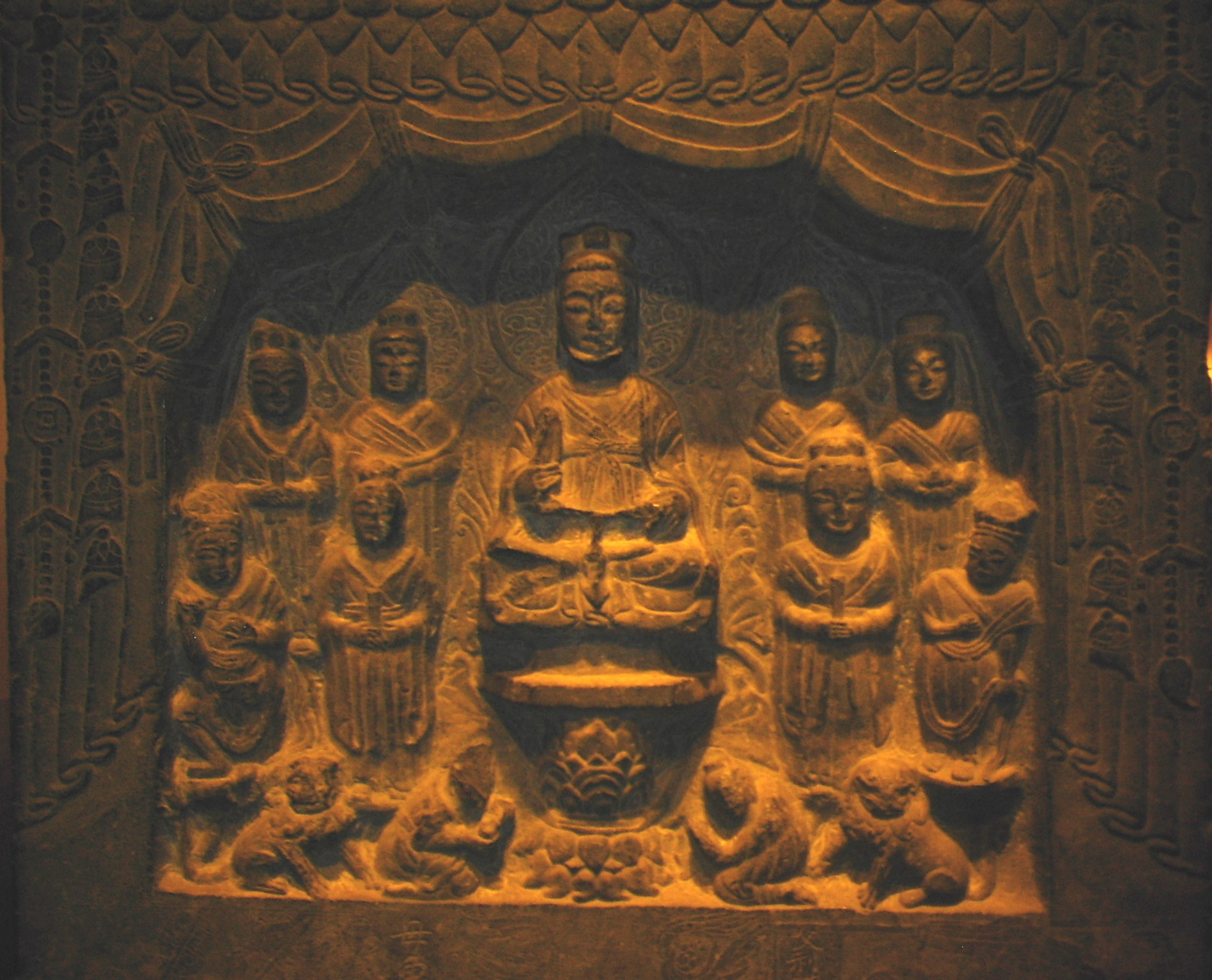
Northern Zhou Daoist stele made of limestone

Eventually, Gao Huan's son Gao Yang forced the Eastern Wei emperor to abdicate in favor of his claim to the throne, establishing the Northern Qi dynasty (551–577). Afterward, Yuwen Tai's son Yuwen Jue seized the throne of power from Emperor Gong of Western Wei, establishing the Northern Zhou dynasty (557–580).

The Northern Qi inherited the primary recruiting grounds of the Northern Wei army; previously, five out of six Northern Wei military officers came from the eastern territories, particularly the local armed forts of Han military families and steppe tribes who had settled in these areas. The members of these military families — both men and women — were often expert riders and archers.

Like its predecessor the Western Wei, the Northern Zhou reacted against sinicization by trying to revive Xianbei warrior culture: reviving Xianbei tunics, trousers and boots, reverting sinicized surnames into Xianbei names and even giving Han officers Xianbei surnames. This "tribalization" policy was intended to convert large numbers of Han Chinese army recruits into "Xianbei" who would pay for their own equipment in exchange for tax exemptions. The policy was highly successful in boosting the state's military strength.

The Northern Zhou dynasty was able to defeat and conquer Northern Qi in 577, reunifying the north. However, this success was short-lived, as the Northern Zhou was overthrown in 581 by Yang Jian, who became Emperor Wen of Sui.

With greater military power and morale, along with convincing propaganda that the Chen dynasty ruler Chen Shubao was a decadent ruler who had lost the Mandate of Heaven, the Sui Dynasty was able to effectively conquer the south. After this conquest, the whole of China entered a new golden age of reunification under the centralization of the short-lived Sui dynasty and the succeeding Tang dynasty (618–907).

The core elite of the Northern dynasties — mixed-culture, and mixed-ethnicity military clans — would later also form the founding elites of the Sui and Tang dynasties. Hence, they tended to have a flexible approach to steppe nomads, viewing them as possible partners rather than intrinsic enemies.

== Southern dynasties ==
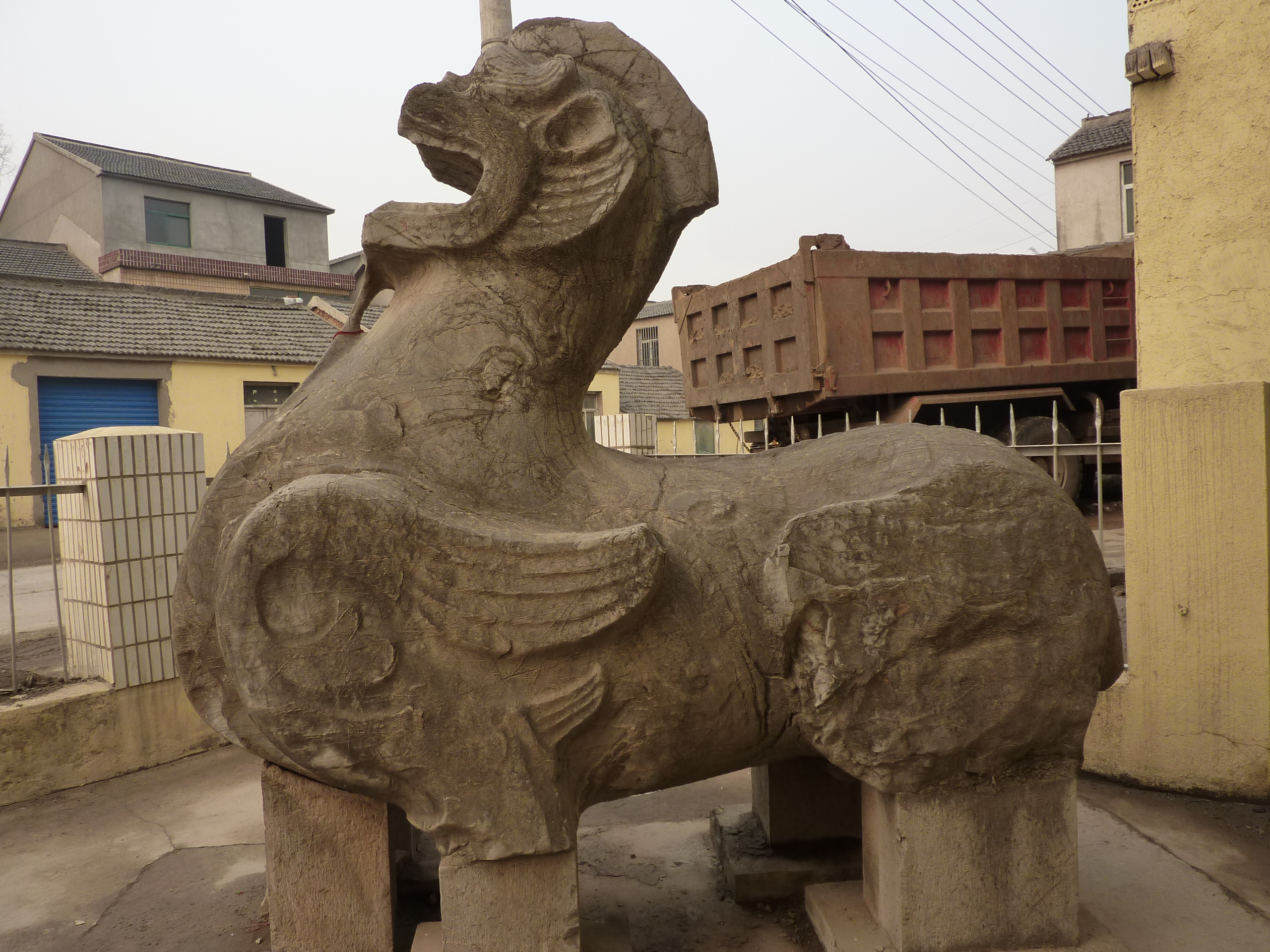
The eastern qilin of the Chuning Tomb, Liu Song dynasty.

The Jin were succeeded by a series of short-lived dynasties: Liu Song (420–479), Southern Qi (479–502), Liang (502–557) and Chen (557–589). As all of these dynasties had their capital at Jiankang (except for a brief interlude from 552 to 555), they are sometimes grouped together with Eastern Wu and Eastern Jin under the historiographic term "the Six Dynasties". The rulers of these short-lived dynasties were generals who seized and then held power for several decades but were unable to successfully transfer power to their heirs to continue their dynasty. Emperor Wu of Liang (502–549) was the most notable ruler of this age, being a patron of the arts and of Buddhism.

The Southern dynasties with the exception of the last Chen dynasty were strongly dominated by the shijia, (great families) who monopolized political power until the mid-6th century. This class was created by Cao Cao during the late Han dynasty when he attempted to consolidate his power by building an endogenous military caste of professional soldiers. His policy led to the rise and usurpation of the Sima family who established the Jin dynasty; subsequent leaders were similarly unable to bring the other great families in line. The Jin dynasty's flight south greatly exacerbated the weakness of the central government, and the great families who accompanied the Emperor in his flight, along with the most wealthy clans of earlier settlers along the Zhejiang coast, were the primary power brokers in the Eastern Jin. With the greatly increased importance of proving one's pedigree to receive privileges, there was a rise in compiling of genealogy records, and the great families moved to legally outlaw intermarriage with common families. The lower class Northern migrants were forced to become "guests" (dependents) of the great families who established private guard forces with their new retainers. When the Eastern Jin attempted to draft the dependents of the great families, the court was quickly overthrown.

However, with the fall of the Eastern Jin in 420, the balance of power shifted in favour the central government. The subsequent Liu Song, Qi, Liang and Chen dynasties were ruled by military leaders from lowly social backgrounds. They gradually stripped the powerful clans of military power, authority and wealth. The emperors stationed regional armies around the country under the command of their imperial relatives. They recruited officers from humble backgrounds and appointed low-ranking officials to monitor the powerful elites occupying the top government posts. The southern aristocracy declined with the rise of the Indian Ocean trade in the mid 5th century, which led to the court revenues shifting to trade and the disappearance of the caste by the Chen dynasty. As landowning aristocrats were unable to convert cash from the produce of their estates, the resurgence of trade and the money-based economy forced them to break up and sell their lands to the burgeoning merchant class. Influential merchants increasingly occupied political offices, displacing the old aristocrats. On the other hand, the economic developments also drove peasants, unable to cope with inflation or to pay taxes in cash, to become mercenary soldiers, wandering through the country selling their services to the warring princes and plundering the populace. These upheavals devastated the south which eased the fall of the south to the Sui dynasty.

Under the waning leadership of the Chen dynasty, the southern Chinese were unable to resist the military power amassed in the north by Yang Jian, who declared himself Emperor Wen of Sui and invaded the south.

Aboriginal chiefs played an important active role in adapting to the dominant Chinese structure, rather than being forcibly subjugated. For instance, the aboriginal chief Lady Xian, who married the Liang court's governor Feng Bao, helped to extend the dynasties' authority while preserving autonomy and local culture. Lady Xian and Feng Bao played a critical role in assisting Chen Baxian's rise, and in stabilising the region between the Liang, Chen, and Sui dynasties. The court acknowledged her authority by awarding her with official titles and emblems of power. There were many other local chieftains of mixed origins between Guangzhou and modern Vietnam that displayed mixed traits of both aboriginal and sinicized culture, such as the Ning of Qinzhou, the Li of Guizhou-Tengzhou and the Chen of Shuangzhou. These families functioned both as cheftains to the natives and bureaucrats to the court.

=== Liu Song (420–479) ===
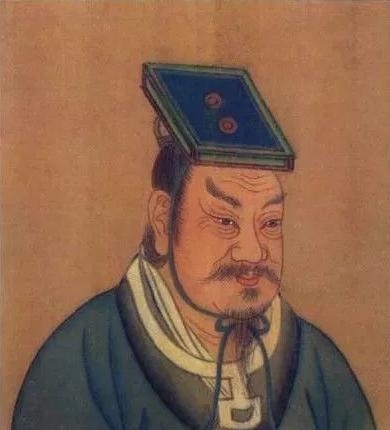
Liu Yu, Emperor Wu of Liu Song

Liu Yu was originally an Eastern Jin general in the Army of the Northern Garrison (Chinese: 北府軍). He rose to prominence for his role in suppressing the Taoist rebel, Sun En, and in 404, he defeated the usurper, Huan Xuan and restored Emperor An of Jin, leading to his dominance over the imperial court. In order to gain prestige and take the throne, Liu Yu led two northern expeditions against the Southern Yan and Later Qin, conquering them and recovering the Shandong, Henan and, briefly, Guanzhong by 416. In addition, he continued to put down popular uprisings in the south while monopolizing power by purging many of his former allies and internal rivals. Liu Yu remained undefeated throughout his military career, and though he was forced to give up the Guanzhong in the end, he invoked a prophecy saying there would only be one more emperor after Emperor An. He deposed Emperor An and his replacement, Emperor Gong, ending the Eastern Jin and establishing the Liu Song dynasty in 420.

Even after crowning himself, Liu Yu, posthumously known as Emperor Wu, remained frugal. However, he did not care for education and trusted unsavory people. He felt that the nobility had too much power, so he tended to appoint the lower classes to government positions and gave military power to imperial kinsmen. Emperor Wu also set a deadly precedent for future emperors; unlike previous usurpers in Chinese history, he had both Emperor An and Emperor Gong killed along with their descendants after their abdications to prevent their restorations. Ironically, this practice was later used by his own successors against one another, often resulting in large-scale massacres within the Song imperial clan.

After the death of Emperor Wu in 422, his son Emperor Shao ruled briefly before being judged incompetent and killed by government officials led by Xu Xianzhi, replacing him with Emperor Wen, a different son, who soon killed the officials who supported him. Emperor Wen's reign was a period of relative political stability because of his frugality and good government; this period was called the Reign of Yuanjia (Chinese: 元嘉之治).

In 430, Emperor Wen started a number of northern expeditions against Northern Wei. These were ineffective because of insufficient preparations and excessive micromanagement of his generals, increasingly weakening the dynasty. Because of his jealousy of Tan Daoji, a noted leader of the Army of the Northern Garrison, he deprived himself of a formidable general to the great delight of the Northern Wei. Thus, they were unable to capitalize when the Northern Wei suffered the Wuqi Incident. Starting in 445, Northern Wei, taking advantage of Liu Song's weakness, made major incursions in the lands between the Yangtze and the Huai (modern-day Shandong, Hebei, and Henan) and devastating six provinces. Emperor Wen lamented that if Tan were still alive, he would have prevented Northern Wei advances. From then on, Liu Song remained in a weakened state.

Emperor Wen was assassinated by Crown Prince Shao and Second Prince Jun in 453 after planning to punish them for witchcraft. However, they were both defeated by Third Prince Jun, who become Emperor Xiaowu. He proved to be licentious and cruel, supposedly committing incest with the daughters of an uncle who had helped him gain the throne; his rivals also claimed he had incest with his mother. This led to two rebellions by the imperial clan, one of which saw him slaughter the inhabitants of Guangling. The following ballad gives an idea of those times:

遙望建康城， Looking toward Jiankang city
小江逆流縈， the little river flows against the current
前見子殺父， in front, one sees sons killing fathers
後見弟殺兄。 and behind, one sees younger brothers killing older brothers (Note: The ballad rhymes in the original Middle Chinese. Note the antithesis between fathers and sons on the one hand, and younger brothers and older brothers on the other, both of which crimes are considered acts of great impiety according to the Confucian tenet known as the Five Bonds.)

Emperor Xiaowu died of natural causes in 464 and was succeeded by his son, who became Emperor Qianfei. Emperor Qianfei proved to be similar to his father, engaging in both kin-slaughter and incest. In a scandalous move, because his sister complained about how it was unfair that men were allowed 10,000 concubines, he gave her 30 handsome young men as lovers. His uncle Liu Yu, the Prince of Xiangdong, whom he called the "Prince of Pigs" for his obesity, eventually assassinated him and became Emperor Ming.

Emperor Ming began his reign by killing all of the descendants of Emperor Xiaowu, and his suspicious nature resulted in the loss of the provinces north of the Huai River, which were only briefly regained in the other Southern dynasties. Emperor Ming's young son became Emperor Houfei. The political situation was volatile. General Xiao Daocheng slowly gained power and eventually deposed Emperor Houfei in favor of his brother, who became Emperor Shun. After defeating the rival general Shen Youzhi, Xiao forced Emperor Shun to yield the throne and crowned himself Emperor Gao of Southern Qi, thus ending the Liu Song dynasty.

=== Southern Qi (479–502) ===
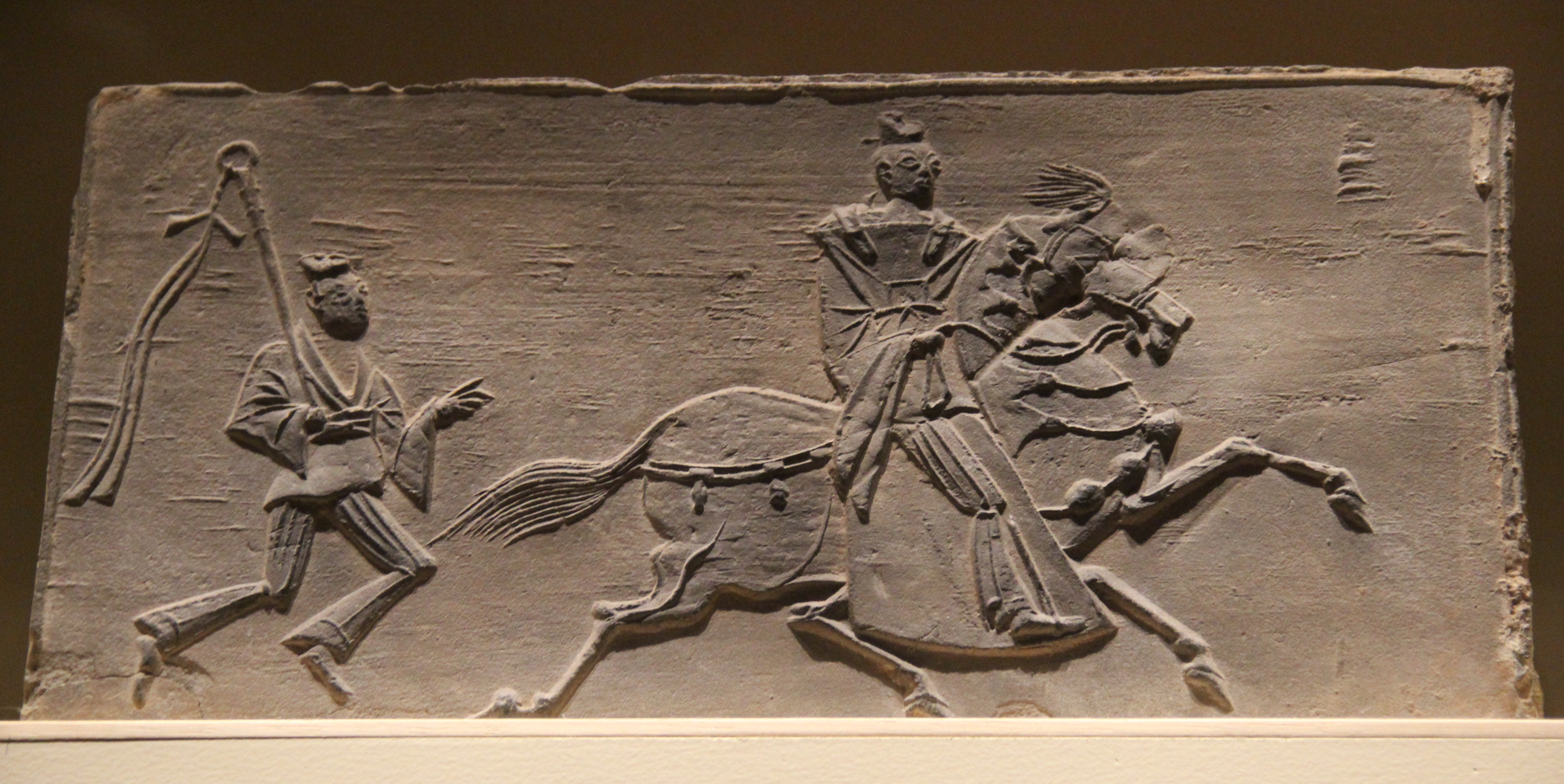
Brick relief from the Dengxian tomb, Dengxian, Henan. Southern Dynasties, circa 500 CE.

Though distantly related, the Southern Qi and the Liang dynasty that followed were members of the Xiao (蕭) family from Lanling (蘭陵, in modern-day Cangshan County, Shandong). Because Emperor Gao had a low social standing, he earned the disdain of nobility. His style of governance was similar to the early style of the Liu Song dynasty and was very economical. He died in the fourth year of his reign and his heir, who was only 13 years younger than him, succeeded him as Emperor Wu of Southern Qi. Emperor Wu made peace with the Northern Wei, content to protect his borders. This period of peace was known as the Yongming Administration. He also used government secretaries appointed with provincial governors and members of the imperial clan to monitor them.

The short reigns of Emperor Wu's grandsons, Xiao Zhaoye and Xiao Zhaowen (his first son predeceased him), were dominated by Xiao Luan, Emperor's Wu's first cousin. He killed them in turn and crowned himself as Emperor Ming. Using the government secretaries, he slaughtered all the sons of Emperors Gao and Wu. Emperor Ming soon became very ill and started following Daoism, changing his whole wardrobe to red. He also passed an edict making officials try to find whitebait (銀魚). He died in 498 and was succeeded by his son Xiao Baojuan, who killed high-ranking officials and governors at whim, sparking many revolts. The final revolt in 501 started after Xiao Baojuan killed his prime minister Xiao Yi, leading his brother Xiao Yan to revolt under the banner of Xiao Baojuan's brother, Xiao Baorong, who was declared Emperor He. Xiao Baojuan was killed by one of his generals during the siege of his capital at Jiankang. After a short puppet reign by Emperor He, Xiao Yan overthrew the Southern Qi and established the Liang dynasty.

=== Liang (502–557) ===
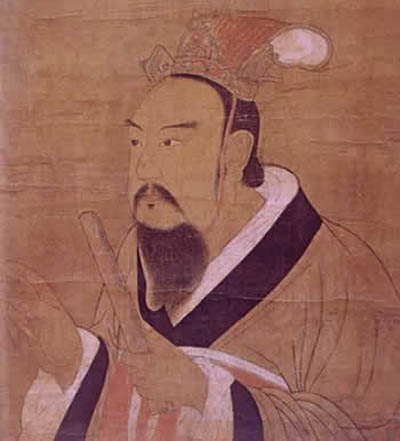
Portrait of Emperor Wu of Liang

Emperor Wu was economical, worked hard at governing, and cared for the common people. His early reign was known as the Reign of Tianjian. The Liang dynasty's military strength gradually surpassed the strength of the Northern Wei, who suffered internal strife due to their policy of sinicization. In 503, the Northern Wei invaded but were defeated at Zhongli (modern-day Bengbu). Emperor Wu supported the Northern Expeditions but did not aggressively take advantage of his victory in 516 at Shouyang due to heavy casualties. Given the excessive kin-slaughter in the Liu Song and Southern Qi dynasties, Emperor Wu was very lenient to imperial clansmen, not investigating them even when they committed crimes. The Liang reached a cultural peak because he was very learned, supported scholars, and encouraged the flourishing education system. An avid poet, Emperor Wu was fond of gathering many literary talents at court, and even held poetry competitions with prizes of gold or silk for those considered the best.

In his later years, however, sycophants surrounded him. Three times he dedicated his life to Buddhism and tried to become a monk, but each time he was persuaded to return by extravagant court donations to Buddhism. Furthermore, since Buddhists and Daoists were exempt from taxation, nearly half of the population fraudulently named themselves as such, badly damaging state finances. Imperial clansmen and officials were also greedy and wasteful.

Emperor Wu was willing to accept generals who defected from Northern Wei. When the Northern Wei suffered major revolts in their northern garrison towns, he sent his general Chen Qingzhi to support the pretender Yuan Hao. Despite the fact that Chen was only given 7,000 troops, he still managed to defeat army after army and even captured Luoyang, the capital of Northern Wei. Ultimately, Chen was insufficiently supplied and was defeated by troops ten times his size. After the Northern Wei split into Eastern and Western Wei, Emperor Wu granted asylum to rebel Eastern Wei commander Hou Jing, sending him on Northern Expeditions against Eastern Wei. After some initial successes, Liang forces were decisively defeated. Rumors abounded that Emperor Wu intended to give Hou as a peace offering. Despite Emperor Wu's assurances, Hou decided to rebel in the name of Xiao Dong, the grandson of the former crown prince Xiao Tong, who died in 531 and was removed from being crown prince because of conflicts with his father. Hou surprised Emperor Liang by besieging the Liang capital at Jiankang. Attempts by Liang forces to break the siege failed, and Emperor Wu was forced to negotiate a ceasefire and peace. However, Hou thought that peace was unsustainable, so he broke the ceasefire and captured the palace, leading to the slaughter of the nearby populace. Emperor Wu was starved to death and after the short puppet reigns of crown prince Xiao Gang and Xiao Dong, Hou seized power and established the Han dynasty.

In spite of conquering Jiankang, Hou essentially only controlled the nearby areas. The rest of the Liang dynasty lands were under the control of members of the imperial clan. Their squabbling amongst themselves weakened their efforts to defeat Hou. In the end, Xiao Yi, with the aid of his generals Wang Sengbian and Chen Baxian, defeated Hou, crowning himself Emperor Yuan. His brother Xiao Ji, based in Sichuan, however, was still a major threat. Emperor Yuan asked for assistance from Western Wei to defeat Xiao Ji, but after subduing him, they kept Sichuan. Due to a diplomatic faux pas, he incited the anger of Yuwen Tai, the leading general of Western Wei, which resulted in him being deposed and dying. Western Wei set up the puppet state of Western Liang with capital at Jiangling. Northern Qi also had designs on the Liang throne and sent an expedition under the banner of a cousin of Emperor Yuan. Chen Baxian and Wang Sengbian set up the last surviving son of Emperor Yuan, Xiao Fangzhi, as Liang ruler, but he was not given the imperial title. After some defeats to the forces of Northern Qi, Wang Sengbian allowed their pretender, Xiao Yuanming to establish himself as Emperor Min of Liang. However, Chen Baxian was displeased with the arrangements, and in a surprise move killed Wang and deposed Emperor Min in favor of Xiao Fangzhi who became Emperor Jing of Liang. After a short reign, Chen deposed Emperor Jing and took power himself as Emperor Wu of Chen in 557.

=== Chen (557–589) ===
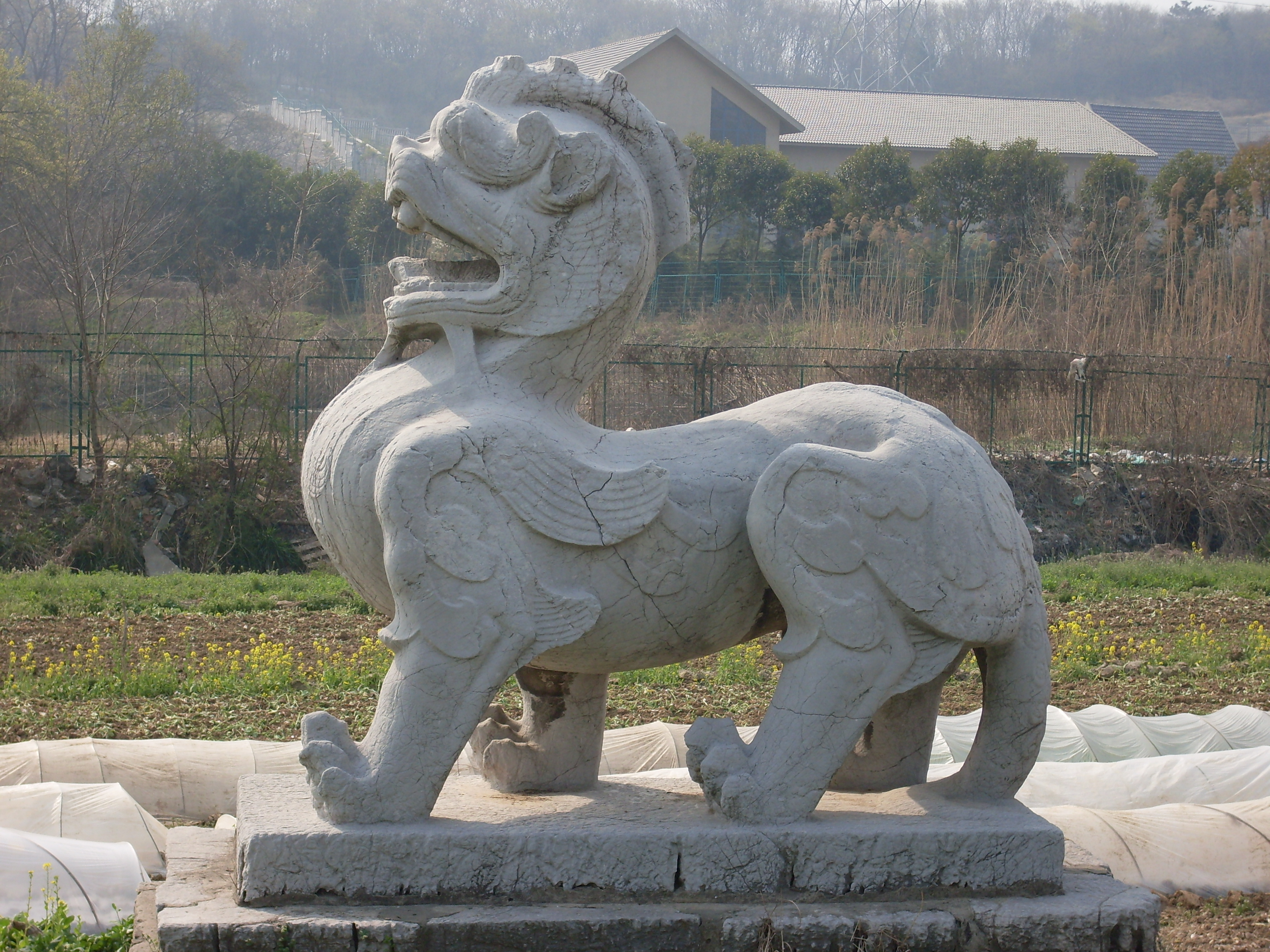
One of the two pixiu statues from the Yongning Tomb of the Emperor Wen of Chen (r. 559–566 AD), Chen Dynasty, Qixia District, Nanjing.

Emperor Wu of Chen came from the region of Wu (a region near modern-day Shanghai). At that time, due to the Hou Jing rebellion, the Qiao and Wu clans were greatly weakened, and many independent regimes emerged. Emperor Wu could not pacify all the independent regimes, so he adopted conciliatory measures. After the sudden death of Emperor Wu, his nephew Chen Qian took power as Emperor Wen of Chen. After the fall of Liang, the general Wang Lin had established an independent kingdom based in modern-day Hunan and Hubei provinces and was now starting to cause trouble. Wang Lin allied with Northern Zhou and Northern Qi to conquer the Chen capital at Jiankang. Emperor Wen first defeated the combined forces of Northern Qi and Wang Lin before preventing the forces of Northern Zhou from entering the South at Yueyang. Furthermore, through Emperor Wen's extensive efforts at good governance, the economic situation of the South was greatly improved, restoring his kingdom's national strength.

Following the death of Emperor Wen, his son, the weak-willed Chen Bozong, took power and became Emperor Fei. His uncle, Chen Xu, after essentially controlling the country through his short reign, eventually deposed him and took power as Emperor Xuan. At that time, the Northern Zhou intended to conquer the Northern Qi and thus invited the Chen dynasty to help. Emperor Xuan agreed to help because he wanted to recover the lost territories south of the Huai River. In 573, he sent general Wu Mingche to assist the effort; in two years, he managed to recover he lost territories south of the Huai River. At the time, the Northern Qi was in a precarious situation with little military strength. Emperor Xuan could have taken advantage of the opportunity to defeat the Northern Qi entirely. However, he only wanted to protect his territories south of the Huai River. The Northern Zhou took advantage of the Northern Qi's weakness instead, and following their defeat of the Northern Qi, in 577, they sent troops to the territories south of the Huai River, where they decisively defeated the Chen dynasty forces. The Chen dynasty was in imminent danger.

In a stroke of fortune, Northern Zhou's Emperor Wu suddenly died and his general Yang Jian attempted to take the throne. This stopped the southern advance of the northern troops. The respite was short though, as after Yang Jian defeated his rival General Yuchi Jiong, he usurped the throne from Emperor Jing of Northern Zhou and established the Sui dynasty, crowning himself Emperor Wen of Sui. He proceeded to invade the south to reunify China. Emperor Xuan had just died and his incompetent son Chen Shubao (Houzhu of Chen) took power. He was licentious and wasteful, resulting in chaos and corruption in the government; many officials heavily exploited the people, causing great suffering. In planning to defeat the Chen dynasty, Emperor Wen of Sui took the suggestion of his general Gao Jiong and waited until the South were harvesting their crops to entirely burn the farmland, crippling the strength of the Chen dynasty. In 588, Emperor Wen of Sui sent his son Yang Guang (who would become Emperor Yang of Sui) to finally vanquish the Chen dynasty. Chen Shubao relied on the natural barrier of the Yangtze River and continued as always with his festive and licentious activities. The next year, Sui forces captured the Chen capital of Jiankang. Chen Shubao and his favorite concubine Zhang Lihua attempted to hide in a well but eventually were captured by Sui forces, thus ending the Chen dynasty.

== Diplomacy ==
After the failure of the Liu Song's efforts to form an alliance with the Rouran, Goguryeo, Tuyuhun and smaller local powers to defeat the Northern Wei, the North and South were forced into tacitly acknowledging their equal status, for example, by granting each other the highest positions as the most esteemed envoys. As the Wei Shu and Song Shu testify, there was a shift from imperial rhetoric denouncing the other side as illegitimate barbarians, towards a new conception referring to the two as distinct 'Northern' and Southern' parallels, using unique local customs to distinguish themselves and compete for legitimacy.

== Demographics ==
It was during the Northern and Southern dynasties period that the earliest recorded mass migration of ethnic Han to southern China (south of the Yangtze River) took place. This sinicization precipitated a change from its previous state of being inhabited by isolated communities separated by vast uncolonized wilderness and other non-Han ethnic groups. During this period, the south went from being nearly a frontier to being on a path to the thriving, urbanized, sinicized region that it became in later centuries. In his book Buddhism in Chinese History, Arthur F. Wright points out this fact by stating:

"When we speak of the area of the Yangtze valley and below in the period of disunion, we must banish from our minds the picture of the densely populated, intensively cultivated South China of recent centuries. When the aristocrats of the remnants of the Chin [Jin] ruling house fled to the Nanking [Nanjing] area early in the 4th century, the south contained perhaps a tenth of the population of China. There were centers of Chinese culture and administration, but around most of these lay vast uncolonized areas into which Chinese settlers were slow to move".

During the Northern and Southern dynasties, the Yangtze valley transformed from a frontier region with less than 25% of China's population to a major cultural center of China with 40% of China's population. After China was subsequently unified under the Tang dynasty, it became the 'core' area of Chinese culture.

== Culture ==
=== Language ===
When the Jin court fled south, they continued to speak in the refined common language, tongyu, from the Central Plains in the North, which was regarded as highly prestigious. However, many local southern Chinese resisted adopting the speech of the newcomers. During the Southern dynasties period, beginning in the mid-4th century and spreading widely by the 5th century, elite northern emigres and southern locals around the capital of Jiankang developed a new elite speech form, with clearly distinctive pronunciation and phrasing that set it apart from the Central Plains speech. However, some of the emigres also resisted this new trend to "prize the speech of Wu", which they regarded as "seductive and frivolous". Meanwhile, the process of Han Chinese courtiers learning Xianbei and Xianbei learning Chinese led to the court speech of the North changing as well. By the 6th century, southern elites looked down on the accent of Luoyang as "crude and clumsy".

=== Philosophy ===
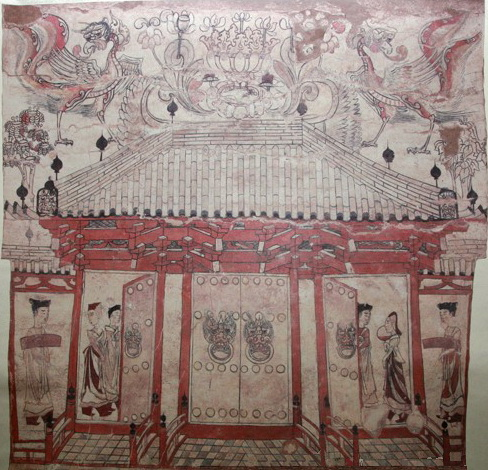
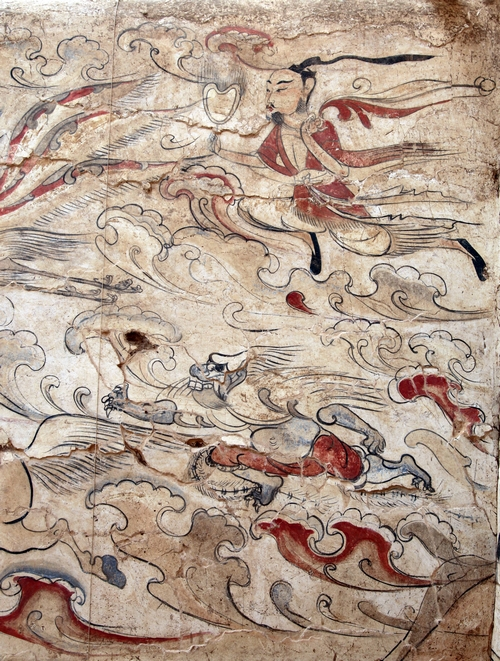
Murals from a tomb of Northern Qi Dynasty (550–577 AD) in Jiuyuangang, Xinzhou

Confucianism's unchallenged domination of Chinese culture and thought was greatly weakened during the Jin dynasty, which led to a wide diversification of political thought and philosophy by the time of the Northern and Southern dynasties. This era produced a myriad of writers that advocated practical systems of governance and administration, such as Cao Cao and Zhuge Liang in the Three Kingdoms Period, Wang Dao and Bao Jingyan of the Eastern Jin, as well as Fan Zhen, Xing Shao (Chinese: 邢邵), and Fan Xun (Chinese: 樊遜) of the Northern and Southern dynasties period. Much of the philosophy of the period is despondent and dispirited, and a number of scholars and poets became reclusive mountain hermits living apart from society. Of these various trends, the most influential was Neo-Daoism (Chinese: 玄學; pinyin: Xuánxué). Neo-Daoism was highly influential during the Southern Dynasty, to the point that Emperor Wen of Liu Song established a Neo-Daoist Academy and promoted it, along with Confucianism, literature, and history, as the four great subjects of study. A phenomenon known as "empty chat" (Chinese: 清談; pinyin: Qīng tán) became common, where educated men would meet and talk about philosophy all day without paying any attention to "mundane" things such as their profession or family. The phenomenon gradually waned during the Sui dynasty, though it did not fully disappear until the Tang dynasty.

=== Literature ===
Literature was particularly vibrant during the Southern Dynasty and tended to be flowery and frilly, while Northern Dynasty literature was rougher and more straightforward. Notable writers include Yu Xin, Xing Fang, Wei Shou, and Wen Zisheng of the Northern Dynasty. In poetry, fu poetry continued to be a dominant genre, though the five-syllable form that achieved great prominence during the Tang dynasty gradually increased in popularity. In the Southern Dynasty, a type of essay known as pianwen, which used metered rhyme, flowery language, and classical allusions, became popular. Writings often spoke of removing oneself from everyday material existence and jettisoning cares and anxiety.

Poets of the Northern and Southern dynasties focused on imitating older classical poets of Ancient China, formalizing the rhyme patterns and meters that governed poem composition. However, scholars realized that ancient songs and poems, like those of the Shijing, in many instances no longer rhymed due to sound shifts over the previous centuries. The introduction of Buddhism to China, which began in the late Han dynasty and continued through the Tang dynasty, introduced Chinese scholars to Sanskrit. The Brahmi script, with its sophisticated phonological organization, arrived in China in the 5th century, and was studied by Xie Lingyun, who produced a (since-lost) glossary of Chinese transcriptions of Sanskrit terms "arranged according to the 14 sounds". The four tones of early Middle Chinese were first described by Shen Yue and Zhou Yong.

=== Other arts ===
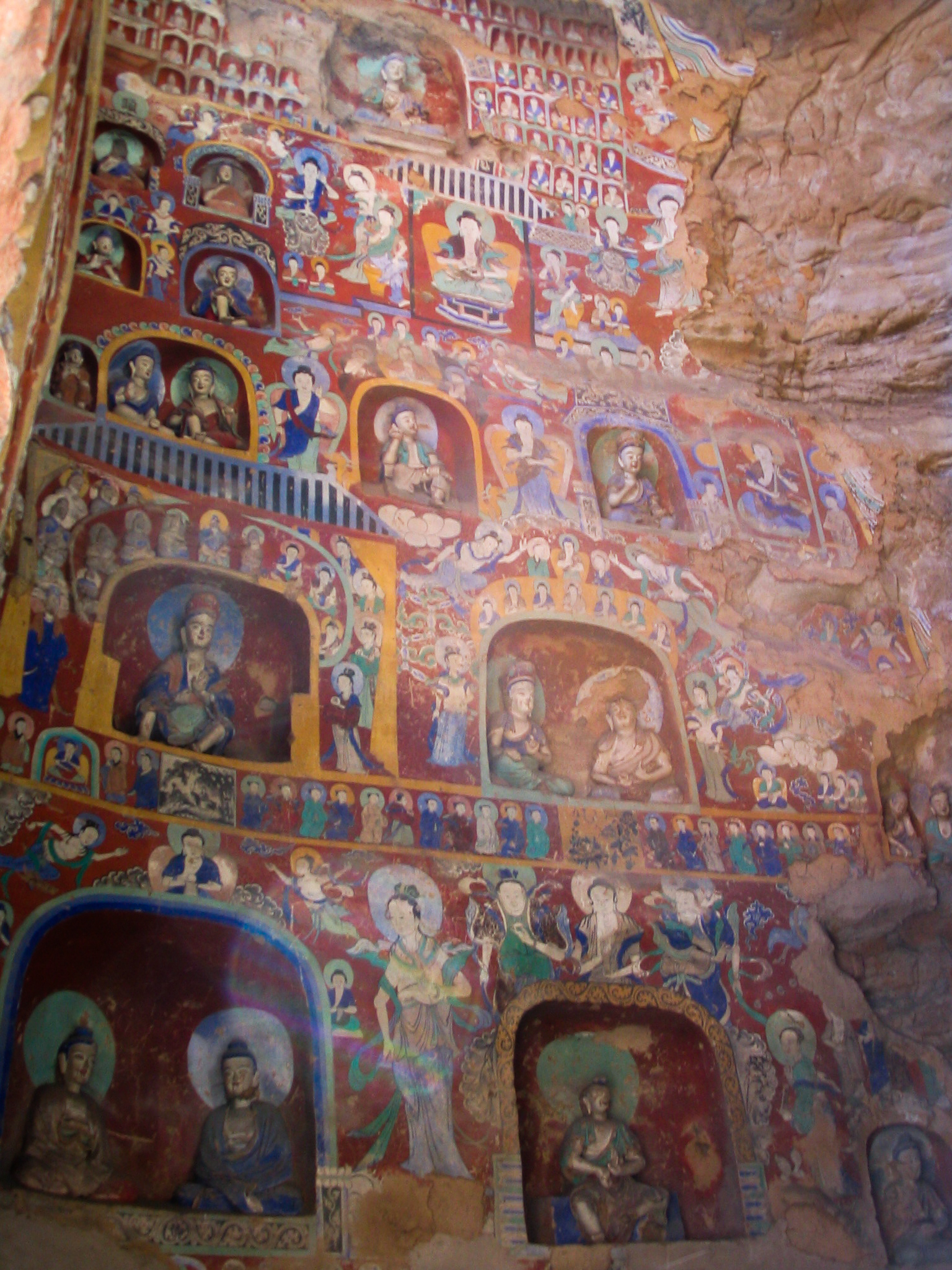
Northern Wei wall murals and painted figurines from the Yungang Grottoes

The southern dynasties of China were rich in cultural achievement, with the flourishing of Buddhism and Daoism, especially the latter as two new canons of scriptural writings were created for the Supreme Purity sect and its rival the Numinous Treasure Sect. The southern Chinese were influenced greatly by the writings of Buddhist monks such as Huiyuan, who applied familiar Daoist terms to describe Buddhism for other Chinese. The Chinese were in contact and influenced by cultures of India and trading partners farther south, such as the kingdoms of Funan and Champa (located in modern-day Cambodia and Vietnam).

The sophistication and complexity of the Chinese arts of poetry, calligraphy, painting, and playing of music reached new heights during this age. The earlier Cao Zhi, son of Cao Cao, is regarded as one of the greatest poets of his day. His style and deep emotional expression in writing influenced later poets of this new age, such as Tao Qian (365–427) or Tao Yuanming. Even during his lifetime, the written calligraphy of the "Sage of Calligraphy", Wang Xizhi (307–365), was prized by many and considered a true form of personal expression like other arts. Painting became highly prized with artists such as Gu Kaizhi (344–406), who largely established the tradition of landscape art in classical Chinese painting (to learn more, refer to the "Far East" section of the article for Painting).

Institutions of learning in the south were also renowned, including the Zongmingguan (Imperial Nanjing University), where the famed Zu Chongzhi (mentioned above) had studied. Zu Chongzhi devised the new Daming Calendar in 465, calculated one year as 365.24281481 days (which is very close to 365.24219878 days as we know today), and calculated the number of overlaps between sun and moon as 27.21223 (which is very close to 27.21222 as we know today). Using this number he successfully predicted 4 eclipses during a period of 23 years (from 436 to 459).

Although multiple-story towers such as guard towers and residential apartments existed in previous periods, during this period the distinct Chinese pagoda tower (for storing Buddhist scriptures) evolved from the stupa, the latter originating from Buddhist traditions of protecting sutras in ancient India. Construction of the Buddhist Yungang and Longmen Grottoes also began under the Northern Wei, who also inherited and continued to develop other cave sites such as Maijishan and Mogao from previous dynasties. Wang Yu, an ethnic Qiang court eunuch and the favourite of Empress Dowager Wenming, patronized Buddhism lavishly. He constructed Cave 9–10, the most highly decorated of the Yungang Grottoes, and had a temple constructed in 488 at Lirun, Fengyi (modern day Chengcheng), which was his birthplace according to the Book of Wei.

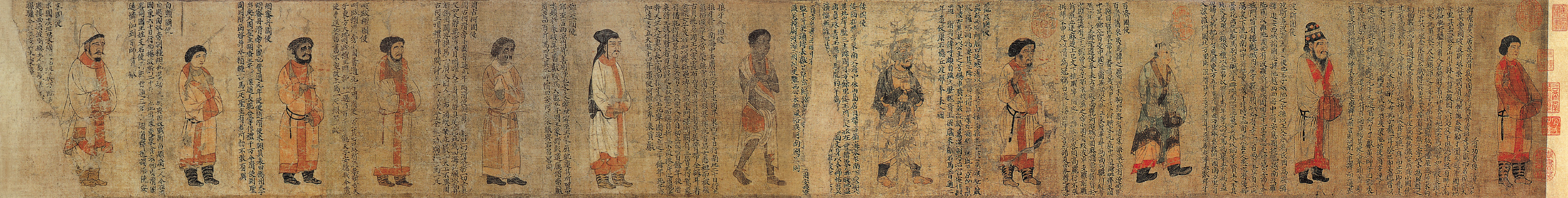
A Song dynasty (960–1279) copy of a lost Liang dynasty original from 526-539: Portraits of Periodical Offering of Liang by Xiao Yi. Foreign emissaries to the Liang court, from right to left: Uar(Hephthalites); Persia; Baekje; Qiuci; Wo (Japan); Langkasuka; Dengzhi (鄧至) of Qiang ethnic group; Karghalik (Yarkand, 周古柯), Kabadiyan (呵跋檀), Kumedhan (胡蜜丹), Baiti (白題, of similar Hephthalite stocks), whom dwell close to Hephthalite; Mo (Qiemo) (且末). National Museum of China.

== Maps ==
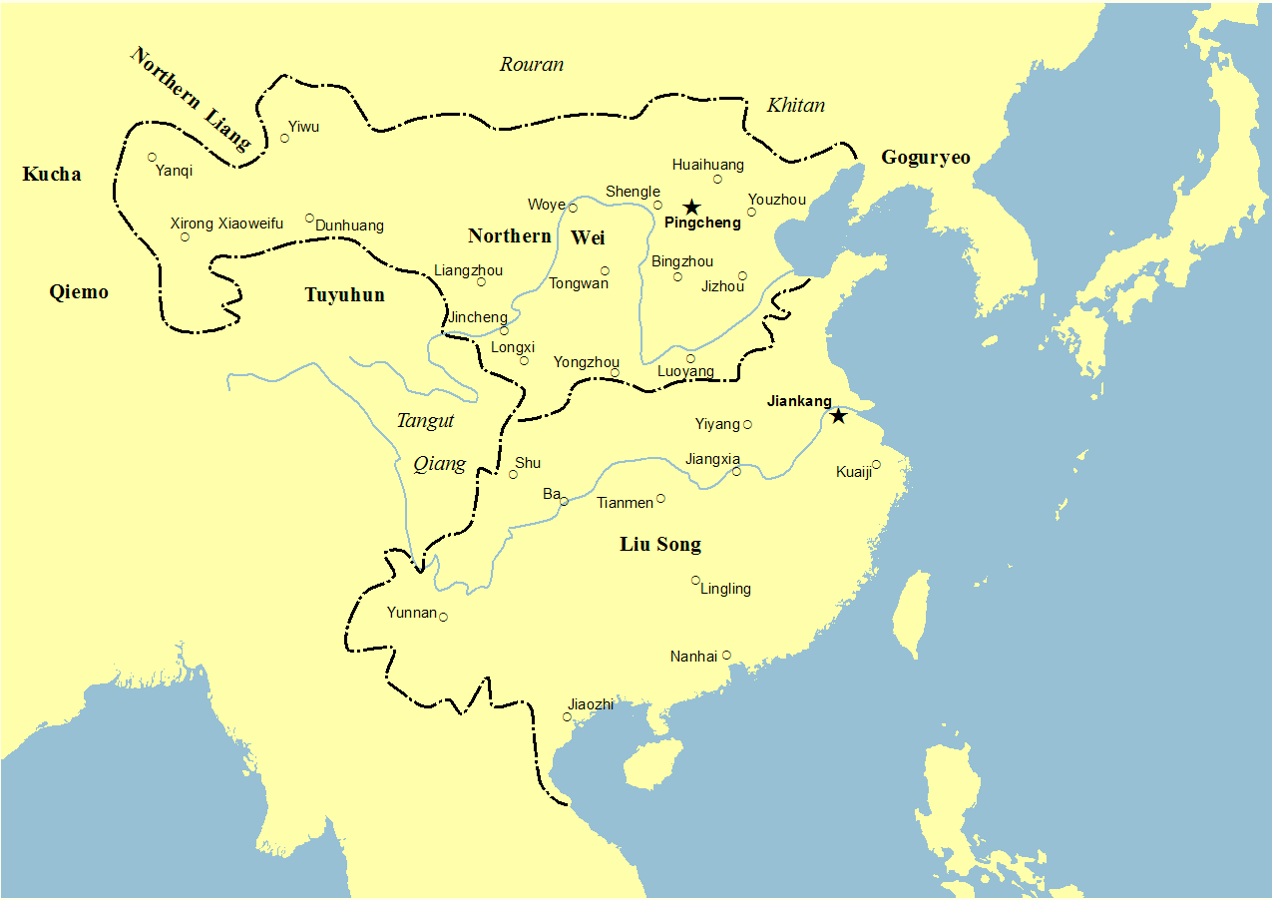
Northern and Southern Dynasties circa 460: Northern Wei and Liu Song

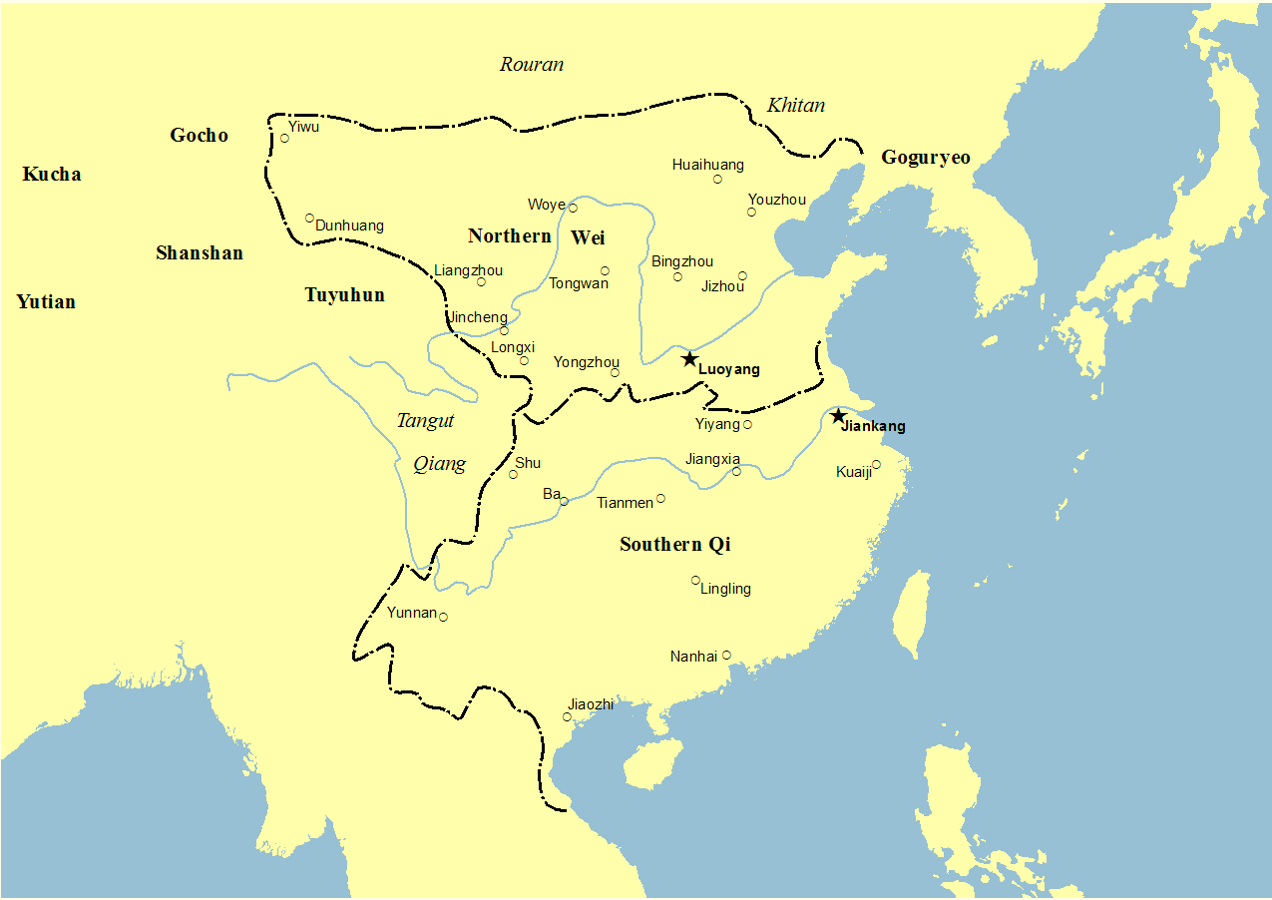
Northern and Southern Dynasties circa 497: Northern Wei and Southern Qi

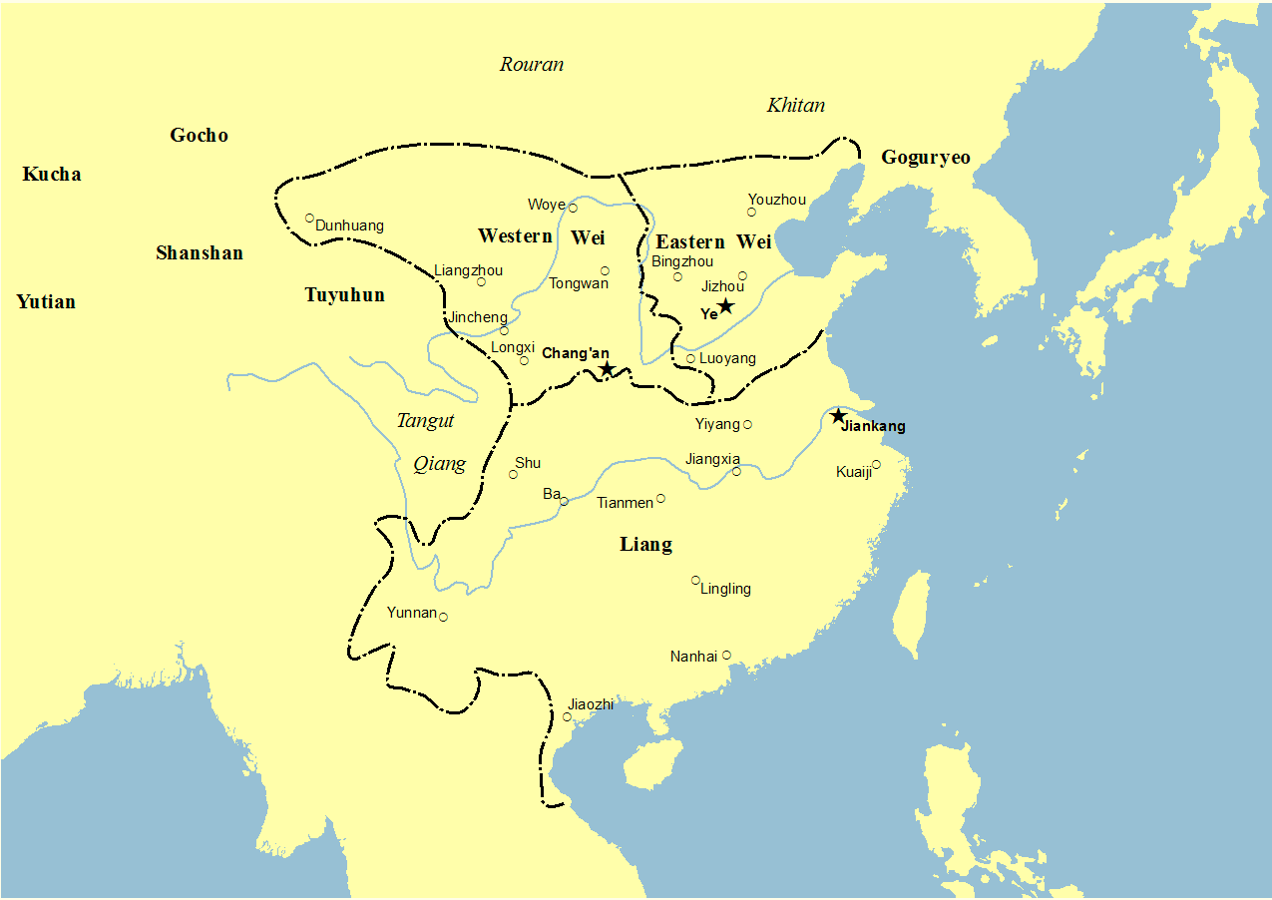
Northern and Southern Dynasties circa 541: Eastern Wei, Western Wei and Liang

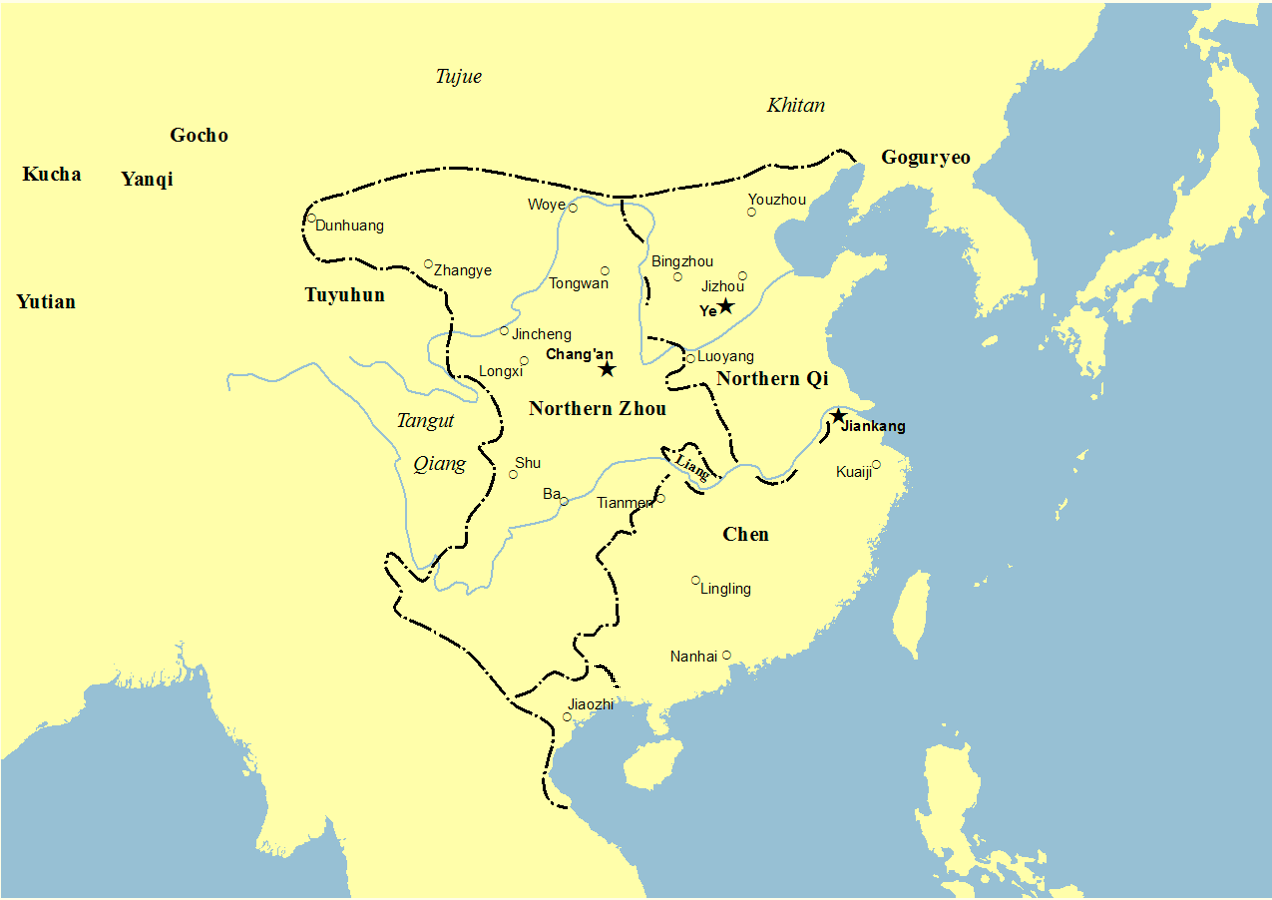
Northern and Southern Dynasties circa 562: Northern Qi, Northern Zhou, Liang and Chen

== See also ==
- Northern and Southern Courts period of Japan
- Military history of the Northern and Southern dynasties
- Timeline of the Northern and Southern dynasties
- Northern and southern China
- Chinese sovereign
- List of tributary states of China
- Buddhism in China
- Empress Dowager Hu (Northern Wei)
- Yan Zhitui
- Jinping Commandery
- Conquest dynasty

== Notes ==
Preceded by Jin dynasty	Dynasties in Chinese history 420–589	Succeeded by Sui dynasty
