= Empress Xia =

Empress Xia (夏皇后) may refer to:

- Empress Dowager Xia (fl. 527–557), empress dowager of the Liang dynasty
- Empress Xia (Song dynasty) (died 1167), wife of Emperor Xiaozong of Song
- Empress Xia (Ming dynasty) (1492–1535), wife of Zhengde Emperor of the Ming dynasty
