= Xu Zhaopei =

- Princess of Xiangdong
- Died: c.June 549
- Spouse: Xiao Yi, Prince of Xiangdong
- Issue: Xiao Fangdeng, Crown Prince Wulie; Xiao Hanzhen, Princess Yichang
Names
- Xu Zhaopei 徐昭佩
- House: Liang dynasty (by marriage)
- Father: Xu Gun

Xu Zhaopei (Chinese: 徐昭佩) (died c.June 549) was an imperial princess of the Chinese Liang dynasty. She was the wife of Xiao Yi, the Prince of Xiangdong, son of the Liang founder Emperor Wu who later ascended to the throne and known posthumously as Emperor Yuan.

== Background ==
Xu Zhaopei was the granddaughter of the Southern Qi prime minister Xu Xiaosi (徐孝嗣). Her father, Xu Gun (徐緄), was also an important official under Emperor Wu. She married Xiao Yi around the new year 518; thereafter she carried the title "Princess of Xiangdong". Xiao Yi was not yet 10 when they wed. In the Book of Liang and History of Southern Dynasties, it was said that as her bridal procession neared Xiao Yi's mansion, powerful winds damaged the house, and it snowed so hard that the curtains all turned white, both of which were considered ill signs.

Princess Xu bore Xiao Yi two children—his oldest son and heir apparent Xiao Fangdeng (蕭方等) and a daughter, Xiao Hanzhen (蕭含貞) (the later Princess Yichang). However, the relationship between Xiao Yi and Princess Xu was stormy, and Xiao Yi rarely joined her in bedchambers—only once every two or three years. Each time he did, she humiliated him, however—as Xiao Yi was blind in one eye, she would intentionally put on makeup only on one side of her face and not the other, to mock him, and he would rush out of her bedchambers when he saw this. She was said to be an alcoholic and jealous. When she knew of Xiao Yi's concubines becoming pregnant, she would try to attack them with swords, and she often drank with the other concubines who were not favored by the prince. She also carried on affairs—initially with the Taoist monk Zhiyuan (智遠), and then later with her husband's associate Ji Jijiang (暨季江) and another man, He Hui (賀徽), and she wrote He poetry. Ji once commented, "Although Lady Xu is old, she is very amorous." This led to the Chinese idiom "the half-old Lady Xu" (徐娘半老, Xu Niang banlao), used to describe a middle-aged or old-aged woman who is considered sexually promiscuous.

Because of the difficult relationship between Xiao Yi and Princess Xu, Xiao Yi also did not favor her son, the heir apparent Xiao Fangdeng. In 548, when the capital Jiankang was besieged by the rebel general Hou Jing, Xiao Yi, then the governor of the important Jing Province (荊州, modern central and western Hubei), sent Xiao Fangdeng with a relatively small detachment to assist other generals in trying to relieve Jiankang, but after Hou captured the capital in spring 549, Xiao Fangdeng returned to Xiao Yi's base of Jiangling. When Xiao Yi saw how organized Xiao Fangdeng's troops were, he was greatly pleased, and he entered Princess Xu's bedchambers to tell her of how much he approved of Xiao Fangdeng. Princess Xu, however, inexplicably responded by crying hard. In anger, Xiao Yi wrote extensively about her affairs and posted the writing onto the provincial government walls. (He later also collected these writings in his work Jinlou Zi (金樓子).)

Xiao Fangdeng became fearful of his father's wrath, and in summer 549, when his cousin Xiao Yu (蕭譽) the Prince of Hedong and governor of Xiang Province (湘州, modern central Hunan) refused to follow Xiao Yi's orders, Xiao Fangdeng volunteered to attack Xiao Yu—and made the comment, "I will surely die on this campaign -- but I would have no regrets dying in the right place." Soon, when he engaged Xiao Yu, he was defeated, and he fell into the Xiang River and drowned. When Xiao Yi heard of Xiao Fangdeng's death, he did not mourn Xiao Fangdeng at all, and his relationship with Princess Xu deteriorated even greater after Xiao Fangdeng's death. When his favorite concubine Lady Wang died, he accused Princess Xu of murdering Lady Wang, and ordered her to commit suicide. She killed herself by jumping into a well. Xiao Yi, instead of burying her with honors due a princess, returned her body to the Xu clan, stating that she had become a divorced wife. He also prohibited his sons from mourning her. When he became emperor in 552, he also made no efforts to posthumously honor her.
