= Reign of Yuanjia =

The reign of Yuanjia (Chinese: 元嘉之治; pinyin: Yuánjiā Zhī Zhì) was a period in Chinese history under the Liu Song dynasty which was comparatively wealthy and stable compared to previous and later periods. It occurred under the diligent Emperor Wen of the Liu Song dynasty, who was an able administrator. Under his administration, most of China enjoyed a period of relative tranquility and calm in the unstable period of the Six Dynasties.
