= Emperor Yuan of Liang =

Emperor of the Liang dynasty from 552 to 555

Emperor Yuan of Liang 梁元帝
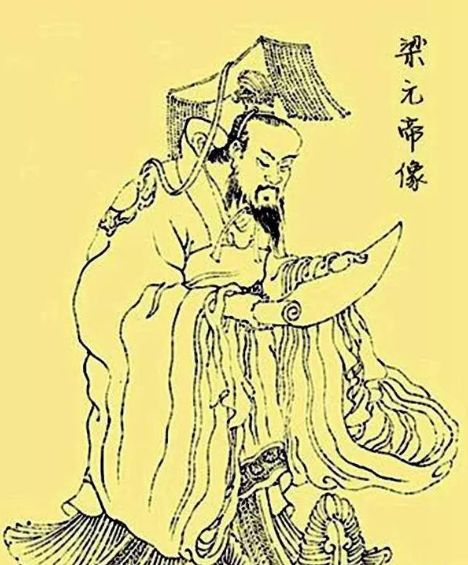

Emperor of the Liang dynasty
- Reign: December 13, 552 – January 7, 555
- Predecessor: Xiao Dong
- Successor: Emperor Min; Emperor Xuan (Western Liang)
- Pretender(s): Xiao Ji (from 16 May 552 to 5 August 553); Hou Jing (from 1 January 552 to August 552)
- Born: Xiao Qifu (蕭七符); September 16, 508
- Died: January 27, 555 (aged 46)
- Consorts: Xu Zhaopei of Donghai; Xia Wangfeng
Full name
- Family name: Xiāo (蕭); Given name: Yì (繹)
Era name and dates
- Chéngshèng (承聖): December 13, 552 – July 1, 555
Posthumous name
- Emperor Yuán (元皇帝, "discerning") (short); Emperor Xiàoyuán (孝元皇帝, "filial and discerning") (full)
Temple name
- Shìzǔ (世祖)
- Dynasty: Liang dynasty
- Father: Emperor Wu
- Mother: Empress Dowager Wenxuan

Emperor Yuan of Liang (Chinese: 梁元帝; pinyin: Liáng Yuándì) (16 September 508 – 27 January 555), personal name Xiao Yi (蕭繹), courtesy name Shicheng (世誠), childhood name Qifu (七符), was an emperor of the Chinese Liang dynasty. After his father Emperor Wu and brother Emperor Jianwen were successively taken hostage and controlled by the rebel general Hou Jing, Xiao Yi was largely viewed as the de facto leader of Liang, and after defeating Hou in 552 declared himself emperor. In 554, after offending Yuwen Tai, the paramount general of rival Western Wei, Western Wei forces descended on and captured his capital Jiangling (江陵, in modern Jingzhou, Hubei), executing him and instead declaring his nephew Xiao Cha (Emperor Xuan) the Emperor of Liang.

Emperor Yuan was a renowned writer and collector of ancient books, but was criticized by historians for concentrating on eliminating potential contenders for the throne rather than on fighting Hou Jing. As Jiangling was besieged by Western Wei troops, Emperor Yuan set his collection of more than 140,000 volumes of ancient books on fire, and this is commonly considered one of the greatest disasters for the study of ancient works in Chinese history.

== Background ==
Xiao Yi was born in 508, as the seventh son of the dynasty founder Emperor Wu. His mother was Emperor Wu's concubine Ruan Lingying (阮令贏), whose original surname was Shi (石), and who had previously been concubine to the Southern Qi prince Xiao Yaoguang (蕭遙光) and then the emperor Xiao Baojuan, and whose surname was changed to Ruan by Emperor Wu. In 514, at the age of six, he was created the Prince of Xiangdong. As the years went by, he got increasingly higher offices, and by 547 he was not only the governor of the key Jing Province (荊州, modern central and western Hubei), but was also titular commander of the troops of the other provinces in the central empire.

Xiao Yi was blind in one eye, as a result of a botched treatment by Emperor Wu for an eye ailment. He was known as learned in literary matters, but not well-versed in military matters. His relationship with his wife Princess Xu Zhaopei was very chilly, and he rarely visited her bedchambers—once every two or three years. When he did, she would mock him by putting makeup on only one side of her face, and when he saw it, he would storm out. She also conducted affairs with a number of men.

== During the Hou Jing Disturbance ==
In 548, the general Hou Jing, who had defected from Eastern Wei in 547, rebelled from his headquarters at Shouyang (壽陽, in modern Lu'an, Anhui). He quickly arrived at the capital Jiankang and, after capturing the outer city, put the palace under siege. Despite the desperate situation that the capital was in, Xiao Yi only sent partial troops, commanded by his heir apparent Xiao Fangdeng (蕭方等) and general Wang Sengbian, to join the other provincial troops to try to lift Jiankang's siege. However, the provincial troops, once they gathered, were hesitant to engage Hou's troops. Xiao Yi himself, commanding the majority of his troops, halted at the border between Jing Province and Ying Province (郢州, modern eastern Hubei), claiming that he needed to wait for the other provincial troops to gather before he could proceed. Meanwhile, as soon as he heard news that Emperor Wu had entered into peace with Hou in spring 549, he withdrew his troops entirely. Hou soon reneged on the peace agreement, however, and put the palace under siege again in earnest, and he soon captured it, seizing Emperor Wu and the crown prince Xiao Gang (Xiao Yi's older brother) effectively as hostages. The provincial troops already at Jiankang took no action and disbanded. Xiao Fangdeng and Wang Sengbian took their troops back to Jing Province. Upon their arrival, Xiao Yi's response was to strengthen the defense of his headquarters at Jiangling. He declined requests by several other provincial governors that he formally undertake imperial powers, but then began to act in accordance therewith, including commissioning generals and governors and creating titles, particularly after his cousin Xiao Shao (蕭韶) the Marquess of Shangjia fled out of Jiankang and claimed to carry a secret edict from Emperor Wu authorizing Xiao Yi to exercise those authorities. When Emperor Wu died in summer 549 and was succeeded by Xiao Gang (as Emperor Jianwen), Xiao Yi learned the news of Emperor Wu's death but kept it secret from his people and army.

Meanwhile, Xiao Yi was displeased that his nephews Xiao Yu (蕭譽) the Prince of Hedong, the governor of Xiang Province (湘州, modern Hunan) and Xiao Cha the Prince of Yueyang, the governor of Yong Province (雍州, modern northwestern Hubei), were resisting his orders. At the same time, his friend Zhang Zuan (張纘), who had a prior dispute with Xiao Yu, falsely informed him that Xiao Yu and Xiao Cha were planning to attack him together. Xiao Yi therefore prepared first to attack Xiao Yu. Xiao Fangdeng, who was fearful of his father on account of his father's chilly relations with his mother Princess Xu, volunteered to command the troops against Xiao Yu, but was defeated by Xiao Yu and drowned in battle. Xiao Yi did not mourn Xiao Fangdeng, and subsequently forced Princess Xu to commit suicide. He would not take another wife for the rest of his life.

Meanwhile, Xiao Yi sent Bao Quan (鮑泉) and Wang Sengbian against Xiao Yu, but over a minor disagreement in strategy, he pierced Wang's leg with a sword and nearly killed him, and Bao ended up commanding the army on his own. Wang would be spared only after his mother made urgent pleas to Xiao Yi to spare her son. Bao was able to defeat Xiao Yu and force Xiao Yu back into his headquarters at Changsha (長沙, in modern Changsha, Hunan), but after putting Changsha under siege for months was unable to capture it. Xiao Cha, trying to save his brother, marched on Jiangling, and Xiao Yi was forced to release Wang from prison and have him command Jiangling's defense forces against Xiao Cha. Wang defeated Xiao Cha, who was forced to retreat back to his headquarters at Xiangyang (襄陽, in modern Xiangfan, Hubei). Xiao Yi subsequently replaced Bao with Wang in sieging Changsha. Meanwhile, Xiao Cha, unable to save his brother and fearful that he would be Xiao Yi's next target, submitted to Western Wei, and Western Wei's paramount general Yuwen Tai sent the general Yang Zhong (楊忠) to assist Xiao Cha, defeating Xiao Yi's army commanded by Liu Zhongli (柳仲禮) in spring 550 and capturing all of Liang territory north of the Han River, after which Xiao Yi made peace with Western Wei, effectively acknowledging Western Wei's suzerainty over Xiao Cha's domain and further declared Liang to be a subordinate state.

Xiao Yi's older brother Xiao Guan (蕭綸) the Prince of Shaoling, at that time holding his troops at Jiangxia (江夏, in modern Wuhan, Hubei), considered trying to save Xiao Yu, but felt that he did not have enough strength to do so, and therefore sent letters to Xiao Yi, trying to persuade him to give up the siege on Changsha. Xiao Yi refused, and continued the siege. Soon, Changsha fell, and Wang executed Xiao Yu. It was only after this point that Xiao Yi acknowledged Emperor Wu's death. While he implicitly recognized Emperor Jianwen as the rightful emperor, he refused to recognize Emperor Jianwen's era name Dabao (大寶) and continued to use Emperor Wu's era name Taiqing (太清), and, citing the fact that Hou Jing was actually in control, did not recognize Emperor Jianwen's edicts. When Xiao Yi's younger brother Xiao Ji the Prince of Wuling, who was then controlling the modern Sichuan and Chongqing region, sent an army commanded by his heir apparent Xiao Yuanzhao (蕭圓照) toward Jing Province, claiming to be willing to accept Xiao Yi's command in attacking Hou, Xiao Yi commissioned Xiao Yuanzhao as the governor of Xin Province (信州, modern eastern Chongqing) and ordered him to halt at Xin Province's capital Baidicheng and not to proceed any further.

Xiao Yi, hearing that Xiao Guan was preparing an attack on Hou, became displeased at the possibility that his brother might be successful, and he sent Wang and Bao against Xiao Guan, but meanwhile claiming to be preparing to engage Hou's general Ren Yue (任約), who had just captured Jiang Province (江州, modern Jiangxi) from Emperor Jianwen's son Xiao Daxin (蕭大心) the Prince of Xunyang and was continuing to advance west. Xiao Guan saw through Xiao Yi's plan, but felt he could not resist, and therefore fled north to Ru'nan (汝南, in modern Jingmen, Hubei), allowing Xiao Yi to take Ying Province under control.

== Confrontation with Hou Jing ==
Meanwhile, Ren Yue's forces were approaching Xiao Yi's territory. When Xiao Ji led his army east, however, Xiao Yi, suspicious of Xiao Ji's intentions, sent him letter to halt him, stating, "The people of Bashu [i.e., Yi Province and surrounding regions] are brave but ferocious, and they easily get emotional and difficult to control. I need you, my brother, to watch over them, so that I can destroy the bandit [i.e., Hou Jing]." He also attached a note, "Based on geography, you and I are like Liu Bei and Sun Quan, and we should each be satisfied with our territory. Based on our blood, we are like the states of Lu and Wei, and we can continuously communicate." Apparently in reaction to Xiao Yi's letter, Xiao Ji returned to his headquarters at Chengdu (成都, in modern Chengdu, Sichuan).

Ren's forces and Xiao Yi's forces, commanded by Xu Wensheng (徐文盛), became stalemated. Hou himself therefore led forces to come to Ren's aid, leaving Jiankang in winter 550. Meanwhile, Western Wei captured Ru'nan and killed Xiao Guan in spring 551, eliminating a potential competitor for the throne for Xiao Yi.

Hou's forces approached Xu's, and he sent Ren and Song Zixian (宋子仙) to make a surprise attack on Jiangxia, capturing it and seizing Bao and Xiao Yi's heir apparent Xiao Fangzhu (蕭方諸), subsequently putting them to death. Xu's forces collapsed, and he was forced to flee back to Jiangling. Xiao Yi instead put Wang Sengbian in charge of his remaining forces, and Wang took up position at Baling (巴陵, in modern Yueyang, Hunan). Instead of bypassing Wang and attacking Jiangling directly, Hou sieged Baling and was unable to capture it. Eventually, his food supplies ran out, and he was forced to retreat. Ren was captured, and soon thereafter, so were Song and Ding He (丁和). Xiao Yi spared Ren, but put Song and Ding to death. Also, claiming that Xu had complained about his leadership, he also put Xu to death. At the same time, his relationship with Xiao Ji would further deteriorate when he arrested Xiao Ji's son Xiao Yuanzheng (蕭圓正) the Marquess of Jiang'an and seized Xiao Yuanzheng's troops.

Xiao Yi sent Wang further east to put pressure on Hou, who by that point had retreated back to Jiankang. By fall 551, Wang had, in conjunction with another key general, Chen Baxian, who had advanced north from Guang Province (廣州, modern Guangdong), captured Jiang Province. Hou, believing that his days might be numbered, first deposed and killed Emperor Jianwen and replaced him with Xiao Dong the Prince of Yuzhang, the grandson of Emperor Wu's first crown prince Xiao Tong (who was also Xiao Yu's and Xiao Cha's father), and then forced Xiao Dong to yield the throne to him, establishing a state of Han. Upon the spread of news of Emperor Jianwen's death, Xiao Yi's generals requested that he take imperial title, but he refused.

By spring 552, Wang and Chen had arrived at Jiankang. They repelled Hou's counterattack against them, and then defeated his troops. Hou abandoned Jiankang and fled east. Wang entered Jiankang, but while most of Hou's generals surrendered, those north of the Yangtze River instead surrendered to Northern Qi. By Xiao Yi's orders, the general Zhu Maichen (朱買臣) found Xiao Dong and threw him and his brothers Xiao Qiao (蕭橋) and Xiao Jiu (蕭樛) into the Yangtze River to drown. Meanwhile, Hou, in flight, was killed by his own attendant Yang Kun (羊鵾). Around the same time, Xiao Ji, not realizing that Xiao Yi had already defeated Hou, claimed imperial title himself.

== Reign ==
For months after Hou's death, Xiao Yi declined imperial title, and but exercised imperial powers still under his title of Prince of Xiangdong. However, he did not have much territory under his control, as the provinces north of the Yangtze and Han Rivers had been lost to Northern Qi and Western Wei, and the western provinces and southern provinces were controlled by Xiao Ji and Xiao Yi's cousin Xiao Bo (蕭勃), respectively.

Despite the state the empire was in, Xiao Yi managed to create another crisis for himself, even as Xiao Ji was approaching Jing Province from the west. He had put his general Wang Lin under arrest, even though Wang Lin was much loved by his troops, and when news of Wang Lin's arrest reached Xiang Province, where Wang had become governor, his troops rebelled under his lieutenant Lu Na (陸納). Troops that Xiao Yi sent to combat Lu Na were not successful in defeating Lu, and Xiao Yi was forced to commit considerable troops to combatting Lu.

In winter 552, Xiao Yi finally took imperial title (as Emperor Yuan). For the time being, the capital was at Jiangling.

Emperor Yuan, facing the dual threat of Lu and Xiao Ji, recalled Wang Sengbian from Jiankang in spring 553. Meanwhile, he requested Western Wei to attack Xiao Ji from the rear, and Yuwen Tai, seeing a chance to seize Liang's western provinces, agreed, sending his nephew Yuchi Jiong south to directly attack Xiao Ji's headquarters at Chengdu. Meanwhile, Xiao Ji, receiving false information from his son Xiao Yuanzhao that Hou had defeated Jing Province forces, continued to advance east. He finally realized the falsity of Xiao Yuanzhao's reports in summer 553, but decided to continue east against Emperor Yuan. Wang Sengbian, while forcing Lu to withdraw into Changsha, was unable to capture Changsha quickly, and Emperor Yuan, finally realizing that Lu was only interested in freeing Wang Lin, released Wang Lin, and Lu surrendered.

Emperor Yuan was then able to concentrate his forces against Xiao Ji, and he offered Xiao Ji peace. Xiao Ji refused, but subsequently realized that he himself was caught between Emperor Yuan's and Western Wei forces. When Xiao Ji offered peace through his official Le Fengye (樂奉業), however, Le revealed the desperate situation Xiao Ji was in, and so Emperor Yuan refused the peace offer, instead sending Wang Lin, Ren Yue, and Xie Daren (Ren and Xie both being Hou's generals that he had pardoned) to cut off Xiao Ji's retreat path. he then sent the general Fan Meng (樊猛) against Xiao Ji's fleet, and Fan, after defeating Xiao Ji, surrounded Xiao Ji's ship. Under Emperor Yuan's orders, Fan boarded Xiao Ji's ship and put him to death. Emperor Yuan excised Xiao Ji's line from the imperial clan, and put his sons under arrest. Meanwhile, Western Wei captured Xiao Ji's domain, and that territory would be permanently lost.

In fall 553, Emperor Yuan announced that he was moving the capital back to Jiankang. His officials' opinions were evenly split, and Emperor Yuan, believing Jiankang to be in shambles and Jiangling to be relatively wealthy, decided to stay in Jiangling, despite its close distance to Western Wei borders. Instead, he again put Wang Sengbian in charge of Jiankang and the surrounding areas.

== Defeat and death ==
In spring 554, Emperor Yuan made a major diplomatic faux pas when both Western Wei and Northern Qi ambassadors arrived at Jiangling, as he treated the Northern Qi ambassadors with far greater respect than the Western Wei ones. He then compounded the insult by sending an arrogant letter to Yuwen Tai, requesting that the borders be refixed to earlier times. Yuwen made the comment, "Xiao Yi is the type of person that, as said in proverbs, 'One who has been abandoned by heaven cannot be revived by anyone else.'" He prepared an attack against Emperor Yuan, and when the Western Wei general Ma Bofu (馬伯符) revealed this to Emperor Yuan, Emperor Yuan did not believe it and took minimal precautions. Suspicious of Wang Lin, he even sent Wang Lin away to be the governor of Guang Province.

In winter 554, Yuwen Tai launched his attack, commanded by Yu Jin and assisted by Yang Zhong and Yuwen Tai's nephew Yuwen Hu; Xiao Cha served as guide. Receiving mixed intelligence reports, Emperor Yuan continued to take no major precautions other than to summon Wang back to the capital, but Wang, being geographically distant from Jiangling, could not arrive quickly. Wang Lin did turn back his forces and try to come to Jiankang's aid, but was also not able to arrive before Western Wei forces surrounded Jiangling. Emperor Yuan, believing that he was on the verge of being captured, set fire to his great collection of ancient books and began to draft articles of surrender. When Xie Daren and Zhu Maichen suggested that he make a surprise dash out of Jiangling to try to join Ren Yue, whose forces were just across the Yangtze River, Emperor Yuan initially agreed, but later, believing that the plan would not succeed and would only bring further humiliation, changed his mind, and walked out of Jiangling to surrender.

Xiao Cha took custody of Emperor Yuan, and interrogated him harshly. Emperor Yuan then made a false promise to the Western Wei general Zhangsun Jian (長孫儉) that he had a large collection of gold that he was willing to give Zhangsun—and once Zhangsun took custody of him, revealed to Zhangsun that he had no gold and was merely trying to get away from Xiao Cha. Zhangsun kept him in his own custody.

In January 555, Western Wei forces put Emperor Yuan to death—with Xiao Cha in charge of the execution. Xiao Cha suffocated him with a bag full of dirt, and then wrapped his body with cloth and tied it with grass, burying it outside of Jiangling. The sons captured with him were also executed. In 557, with Wang Lin still trying to maintain Liang as a dynasty, Western Wei returned Emperor Yuan's body to Wang Lin. However, it was not until after Wang Lin was defeated by Emperor Wen of Chen that Chen dynasty had Emperor Yuan buried with imperial honors on 20 July 560.

== Family ==
- Princess consort, of the Xu clan of Donghai (王妃 東海徐氏; d. 549), personal name Zhaopei (昭佩)
  - Xiao Fangdeng (湘東武烈世子 蕭方等; 528–549), first son
  - Princess Yichang (益昌公主), personal name Hanzhen (含貞)
- Empress Dowager, of the Xia clan (皇太后 夏氏), personal name Wangfeng (王豐)
  - Xiao Fangzhi, Emperor Jing (敬皇帝 蕭方智; 543–558), ninth son
- Guipin, of the Wang clan (貴嬪 王氏)
  - Xiao Fangzhu (湘東貞惠世子 蕭方諸; 537–552), second son
  - Xiao Fanglüe, Prince of Shi'an (始安王 蕭方略; d. 554), tenth son
- Guiren, of the Yuan clan (貴人 袁氏)
  - Xiao Yuanliang, Crown Prince Minhuai (愍懷皇太子 蕭元良; d. 554), fourth son
- Unknown
  - Xiao Fanggui (蕭方規)
  - A daughter, personal name Hanjie (含介)
  - Princess Anchang (安昌公主)
    - Married Xu Che of Donghai (東海 徐徹), and had issue (one son)
  - A daughter, personal name Hanzhi (含芷)

Regnal titles
Preceded by Xiao Ji (Prince of Wuling)	Emperor of the Liang dynasty (Western); 552–554	Succeeded by Emperor Xuan of Western Liang
Preceded by Xiao Dong (Prince of Yuzhang)	Emperor of China (Western Hubei); 552–554	Succeeded by Emperor Xuan of Western Liang
Preceded by Xiao Dong (Prince of Yuzhang)	Emperor of China (Southern); 552–554	Succeeded by Xiao Yuanming (Marquess of Zhenyang)
Preceded by Xiao Dong (Prince of Yuzhang)	Emperor of the Liang dynasty (Eastern/Central/Southern); 552–554	Succeeded by Xiao Yuanming (Marquess of Zhenyang)
Preceded by Hou Jing of Han	Emperor of China (Southeastern); 552–554	Succeeded by Xiao Yuanming (Marquess of Zhenyang)
