= Empress Dowager Xia =

Empress Dowager Xia (夏太后), possibly Xia Wangfeng (夏王豐), was an empress dowager of the Chinese Liang dynasty. She was the mother of Emperor Jing (Xiao Fangzhi).

The future Empress Dowager Xia was from Kuaiji Commandery on the southern shore of Hangzhou Bay. Sometime between 520 and 527, she became a concubine of Xiao Yi the Prince of Xiangdong, a son of Liang's founder Emperor Wu. In 544, Empress Dowager Xia and Xiao Yi had a son, Xiao Fangzhi. After Xiao Yi declared himself emperor in 552 (as Emperor Yuan), he created Xiao Fangzhi the Prince of Jin'an, and he honored Consort Xia as the Princess Dowager of Jin'an. She also carried the imperial consort rank guifei (貴妃), the first rank among imperial consort. After Emperor Yuan was captured and killed by Western Wei in 554, Xiao Fangzhi was declared emperor by the general Chen Baxian in 555. Princess Dowager Xia was honored as empress dowager. However, Chen controlled the government, and in 557 he forced Emperor Jing to yield the throne to him, establishing the Chen dynasty (as its Emperor Wu). Emperor Jing was created the Prince of Jiangyin, and Empress Dowager Xia thus became the Princess Dowager of Jiangyin. Chen Baxian had Xiao Fangzhi killed in 558, and nothing further was recorded in history about the former empress dowager.

== Notes and references ==
- New Book of Tang, vol. 12.
- Zizhi Tongjian, vols. 166, 167.
