= Book of Chen =

Book by Yao Silian about the Chen dynasty (636)

- Traditional Chinese: 陳書
- Simplified Chinese: 陈书
Transcriptions
Standard Mandarin
- Hanyu Pinyin: Chén Shū
Southern Min
- Hokkien POJ: Tân-su

The Book of Chen or Chen Shu (Chén Shū) was the official history of the Chen dynasty, one of the Southern dynasties of China. The Book of Chen is part of the official Twenty-Four Histories of imperial China. It was compiled by the Tang dynasty historian Yao Silian and completed in 636 AD (Zhenguan 10th year). The Chen Shu is a biographical history book with thirty-six volumes, recording the historical facts of 33 years from the accession of Chen Baxian (Emperor Wu of Chen) to the last emperor Chen Shubao (Emperor Houzhu of Chen).

== Synopsis ==
Chen Shu consists of 36 volumes, including 6 volumes of biographies of emperors and 30 volumes of other biographies. In addition to the national history of the Chen dynasty and the old draft compiled by Yao's father and son, the historical sources of Chen Shu include eight volumes of Yongding Residence Note (永定起居注), twenty-three volumes of Tianjia Residence Note (天嘉起居注), ten volumes of Tiankang Everbright Residence Note (天康光大起居注), fifty-six volumes of Taijian Residence Note (太建起居注), four volumes of Zhide Residence Note (至德起居注) and other historical materials and books written by others.

The Chen dynasty revitalized the economy of Southern China, making it a metropolis for traders and Buddhists from as far as India and Southeast Asia. Although the Book of Chen is brief compared to the Book of Liang or the Book of Sui, (Note: The Liang lasted 56 years, the Chen 33 years, and the Sui 38 years, so the number of volumes is not proportional to the length of regime.) much of the Chen dynasty history is also included in other books like the Book of Sui. Moreover, the Chen royal family continued to hold high political office, prestige, and power within the subsequent Tang dynasty of China, for example with officials such as Chen Shuda and Xuanzang (Chen Yi) holding high favor with Tang emperors and many other Chen family members being married into the Tang royal family. Xuanzang is known for his pilgrimage to India and features in China's epic novel Journey to the West. Xuanzang / Chen Yi was also the "sworn brother" (义兄) of Emperor Taizong of Tang and was bestowed the name Tang Sanzang. Thus, much of the history of the Chen royal family continued after the Chen dynasty and featured in China's subsequent dynasties and golden ages.

== Sources ==
It heavily relied on Yao Silian's father Yao Cha's original manuscript. The book is one of the more complete extant records of the Chen dynasty. There are also alternate commentaries, including one by Tang prime minister Wei Zheng, which is also included in the book.

In addition to his use of Yao Cha's previous works, Yao Silian relied by contemporary court diaries by Gu Yewang 顧野王 (519–581) and Fu Zai 傅縡 (531–585) and an earlier text also named Chen shu 陳書, compiled by Lu Qiong 陸瓊 (537–586).

There are other histories, including the Zizhi Tongjian written during the Song dynasty.

== Writing the Book of Chen ==
Yao Cha (533–606), born in Wu Kang, Xing Wu (now Deqing County, Huzhou City, Zhejiang Province), was a historian of the Southern dynasties.

Yao Silian (557 ~ 637), whose real name is Jian, was born in Yongzhou Wannian (now Xi'an, Shaanxi Province) during the Chen dynasty. During the Chen dynasty, he was an official minister and writer. During the Sui dynasty, he was a secretary and was ordered by the Sui emperors to continue writing the histories of the Liang and Chen dynasties. History has called Yao Silian an esteemed Confucian scholar who had seen the accomplishments of three generations of China (Chen, Sui, Tang).

In 606, Yao Cha died, and Silian continued writing these books. After the Tang destroyed the Sui, Yao Silian was appointed as a writer of the Hongwen Museum (弘文馆学). In 629, under imperial edict, Yao worked to finish the Book of Liang and Book of Chen, which was completed in 636.

Although Yao Cha and Yao Silian are historians, they both have profound literacy in writing. In terms of writing history, their writing is concise and simple, and they are forbidden to pursue the magnificence and superficiality of rhetoric. They inherit the style and style of writing of Sima Qian and Ban Gu, and their writing is valuable in the history of the Southern dynasties. As for when Yao Silian wrote the essay, Liu Zhiji's "Shi Tong" refers to the beginning of Zhenguan, when Silian was written into two histories by imperial edict, which lasted for nine years before he finished his work. Ceng Gong's Preface to Collation refers to Yao's investigation of Liang and Chen's affairs, but his book is not finished, which belongs to Zi Silian's inheritance.

== Brief chronology ==
In 557 AD, the Liang dynasty was succeeded by the Chen dynasty. By 589 AD, the Chen dynasty, Northern Zhou, and Northern Qi were succeeded by the Sui dynasty. In 618 AD, the Sui dynasty was destroyed by the Tang dynasty, which would rule China for around three centuries. It was in 636 AD, during the Tang dynasty, under the reign of Emperor Taizong of Tang that Yao Silian, a former Chen dynasty official, wrote the Book of Chen.

== Contents ==
=== Annals (紀) ===
#	Title	Translation	Notes
Volume 1	本紀第1 高祖上	Emperor Wu	
Volume 2	本紀第2 高祖下	Emperor Wu	
Volume 3	本紀第3 世祖	Emperor Wen	
Volume 4	本紀第4 廢帝	Emperor Fei	
Volume 5	本紀第5 宣帝	Emperor Xuan	
Volume 6	本紀第6 後主	Houzhu	

=== Biographies (列傳) ===
#	Title	Translation	Notes
Volume 7	列傳第1 皇后	Empresses	
Volume 8	列傳第2 杜僧明 周文育 侯安都	Du Sengming; Zhou Wenyu; Hou Andu	
Volume 9	列傳第3 侯瑱 歐陽頠 吳明徹 裴子烈	Hou Tian; Ouyang Wei; Wu Mingche; Pei Zilie	
Volume 10	列傳第4 周鐵虎 程靈洗	Zhou Tiehu; Cheng Lingxi	
Volume 11	列傳第5 黃法𣰰 淳于量 章昭達	Huang Faqu; Chunyu Liang; Zhang Zhaoda	
Volume 12	列傳第6 胡穎 徐度 杜稜 沈恪	Hu Ying; Xu Du; Du Leng; Shen Ke	
Volume 13	列傳第7 徐世譜 魯悉達 周敷 荀朗 周炅	Xu Shipu; Lu Xida; Zhou Fu; Xun Lang; Zhou Jiong	
Volume 14	列傳第8 衡陽獻王昌 南康愍王曇朗	Chen Chang; Chen Tanlang	
Volume 15	列傳第9 宗室	Imperial Family	
Volume 16	列傳第10 趙知禮 蔡景歷 劉師知 謝岐	Zhao Zhili; Cai Jingli; Liu Shizhi; Xie Qi	
Volume 17	列傳第11 王沖 王通 袁敬	Wang Chong; Wang Tong; Yuan Jing	
Volume 18	列傳第12 沈眾 袁泌 劉仲威 陸山才 王質 韋載	Shen Zhong; Yuan Mi; Liu Zhongwei; Lu Shancai; Wang Zhi; Wei Zai	
Volume 19	列傳第13 沈炯 虞荔 馬樞	Shen Jiong; Yu Li; Ma Shu	
Volume 20	列傳第14 到仲舉 韓子高 華皎	Dao Zhongju; Han Zigao; Hua Jiao	
Volume 21	列傳第15 謝哲 蕭乾 謝嘏 張種 王固 孔奐 蕭允	Xie Zhe; Xiao Qian; Wang Gu; Kong Huan; Xiao Yun	
Volume 22	列傳第16 陸子隆 錢道戢 駱牙	Lu Zilong, Qian Daoji, Luo Ya	
Volume 23	列傳第17 沈君理 王瑒 陸繕	Shen Junli; Wang Yang; Lu Shan	
Volume 24	列傳第18 周弘正 袁憲	Zhou Hongzheng; Yuan Xian	
Volume 25	列傳第19 裴忌 孫瑒	Pei Ji; Sun Yang	
Volume 26	列傳第20 徐陵	Xu Ling	
Volume 27	列傳第21 江總 姚察	Jiang Zong; Yao Cha	
Volume 28	列傳第22 世祖九王 高宗二十九王 後主諸子	Nine Princes of Wen; Twenty-nine Princes of Xuan; Princes of Houzhu	
Volume 29	列傳第23 宗元饒 司馬申 毛喜 蔡徵	Zhuang Yuanrao; Sima Shen; Mao Xi; Cai Zhi	
Volume 30	列傳第24 蕭濟 陸瓊 顧野王 傅縡	Xiao Ji; Lu Qiong; Gu Yewang; Fu Zai	
Volume 31	列傳第25 蕭摩訶 任忠 樊毅 魯廣達	Xiao Mohe; Ren Zhong; Fan Yi; Lu Guangda	
Volume 32	列傳第26 孝行	Filial Piety	
Volume 33	列傳第27 儒林	Confucian Scholars	
Volume 34	列傳第28 文學	Writers	
Volume 35	列傳第29 熊曇朗 周迪 留異 陳寶應	Xiong Tanlang; Zhou Di; Liu Yi; Chen Baoying	
Volume 36	列傳第30 始興王叔陵 新安王伯固	Chen Shuling, Prince of Shixing; Chen Bogu, Prince of Xin'an	

== Evaluation ==
Among Yao Cha's old manuscripts left to Yao Silian, there were fewer that could be used for writing the history of Chen than for the history of the Liang. When Yao Silian wrote Chen Shu, he mainly referred to the writings by Lu Qiong, Gu Yewang, Fu Ying and others.

Later writers such as Northern Song dynasty writers remarked that the Chen dynasty rulers liked to live in peace.

However, some of the historical contents recorded in Chen Shu are still meaningful. Wei Zhi of the Tang dynasty, Ceng Gong of the Song dynasty, and Zhao Yi of the Qing dynasty all thought; "Chen Shu" has its historical value in describing "why it flourished at the beginning" and "why it died at the end" (the Chen dynasty), especially in revealing Chen Baxian's "measuring the grand outline, knowing people and being good at their duties" (度量恢廓，知人善任) and Chen Shubao's "drinking for a long night, and spoiling in the sins of a brilliant wife" (躭荒为长夜之饮，嬖宠同艳妻之孽). In addition, in the biography of Chen Shu, Empress Zhang Guifei intervened in the government affairs, and later the last emperor Chen Shubao was concerned more with inviting guests to banquets and fancy dinners than governing, which he left to his subordinates. This contrasts starkly with the first emperor Chen Baxian's more disciplined and active leadership in the dynasty and often served as an important lesson to later Chinese rulers on how to best govern.

The Literature of He Zhiyuan (文学·何之元传) contains the preface of Liang Dian (梁典) written by He Zhiyuan, which is a valuable article in history. Liang Dian no longer exists, but today people can understand the genre, style and content of this book from this preface. The preface says, "opening this book is divided into six meanings", namely, "Retrospect", "Taiping", "Xu Chaos", "Shizu", "Respect for Emperor" and "Heir Master" (追述, 太平, 叙乱, 世祖, 敬帝, 后嗣主). It also quoted the historian Zang Rongxu as saying: "History has no judgment, but it is still important to pay attention to it." (史无裁断，犹起居注耳。) This is also one of the precious ideological heritages in the history of historiography. Although Chen Shu is briefer than Liang Shu on the whole, the Book of Chen is more rigorous and reasonable than the latter in editing. All these are worthy of recognition.

Attention should be paid to the general remarks written by Wei Zhi for Liang Shu and Chen Shu. When Emperor Taizong wrote a letter to repair the history of Liang, Chen, Qi, Zhou, Sui and Five Dynasties, Fang Xuanling and Wei Zhi were the directors, and all the history summaries were made by Wei Zheng. The general introduction of Liang Shu is at the end of Volume 6, Emperor Ji. The general introduction of Chen Shu is also at the end of Volume 6 Emperor Ji, and in addition, at the end of Volume 7 Biography of Empress, he added historical facts to the romantic life between of Chen Shubao, Zhang Guifei and others. Reading the general remarks written by Wei Zhi can be used as a reference for grasping and analyzing the history of the Liang and Chen dynasties from a macro perspective.

Generally speaking, Wei Zhi's (魏徵) knew more about Chen dynasty politics than Yao Cha and Yao Silian, which is largely due to the fact that the former commented on history from the perspective of politicians. However, in terms of style, Wei Zhi's historical theory still follows the parallel prose of the six dynasties (Liang, Chen, North Zhou, North Qi, Sui, Tang). However, Yao Silian and especially Yao Cha used prose (散文) in historical theory in the era when parallel prose (骈体文) is popular, which is the place where their style of writing exceeds that of Wei Zhi, and it also had an impact on the rise of ancient prose movement in the middle Tang dynasty.

Moreover, there are many facts that were glossed over in the Chen Shu, either out of being afraid to add them or other reasons. A typical example is the biography of Liu Shizhi (刘师知), which makes no mention of Liu Shizhi helping Chen Baxian rise to power. Such facts have been included in the History of the Southern Dynasties (南史).

As for the laws and governance of the Chen dynasty, these are included in the annals of Sui Shu. In general, the Book of Sui wrote about the evolution of the laws and regulations of the five dynasties of Liang, Chen, Qi, Zhou and Sui, which has been essential to historians in understanding the history of these five dynasties.

== See also ==
- Chen dynasty
- Chen Baxian
- Yao Silian
- Twenty-Four Histories
- Book of Sui
- Book of Liang
- History of the Southern Dynasties
- Zizhi Tongjian
