= Book of Liang =

Chinese book about Liang dynasty (635)

- Traditional Chinese: 梁書
- Simplified Chinese: 梁书
Transcriptions
Standard Mandarin
- Hanyu Pinyin: Liáng Shū
Southern Min
- Hokkien POJ: Liông-su

The Book of Liang (Liáng Shū) was compiled under Yao Silian and completed in 635. Yao heavily relied on an original manuscript by his father Yao Cha, which has not independently survived, although Yao Cha's comments are quoted in several chapters.

The Book of Liang is part of the Twenty-Four Histories canon of Chinese history.

== Sources ==
Although the Book of Liang was finally attributed to Yao Silian, a number of people worked on it. Initially, Emperor Wen of Sui ordered Yao Cha 姚察 (533–606) to compile the Book of Liang but Yao Cha died without being able to complete it. Before dying Yao Cha requested that his son Yao Silian complete the work. Emperor Yang of Sui agreed to compilation of the text by Yao Silian. In the Tang, the compilation of the text was part of an initiative at the suggestion of Linghu Defen shortly after the founding of the Tang dynasty to compile a number of histories for the previous dynasties. Then, Yao Silian was ordered to complete the Book of Chen by Emperor Gaozu of Tang, who ordered other scholars to work on the Book of Liang. When those scholars did not complete their task, Yao Silian was again ordered to work on the text. The Book of Liang was finally compiled by Yao Silian under the supervision of Fang Xuanling and Wei Zheng in the Tang, incorporating at least some of the work of his predecessors.

== Quotations on Japan and its surrounding neighbours ==
It contains the history of the Liang dynasty, and various descriptions of countries to the east of China. One such passage is the description by the monk Hui Shen (慧深) of the country of Fusang, 20,000 li east of China.

Note, the Chinese measure of distance (li) used in the Book of Liang corresponds to 400 metres.

=== The State of Wa ===
Wa was an ancient kingdom of Japan. Though little concrete information can be found today, its capital precinct, Yamatai, was most likely located either in Kyūshū or in the Kinki region.

"As for Wa, they say of themselves that they are posterity of Taibo. The people are all tattooed. Their territory is about 20,000 li (1,500 kilometres) from our realm, roughly to the east of Guiji (modern Shaoxing (Zhejiang)). It is impossibly distant. To get there from Daifang, it is necessary to follow the coast and go beyond the Korean state to the south-east for about 500 kilometres, then for the first time cross a sea to a small island 75 kilometres away, then cross the sea again for 75 kilometres to Miro country (Ch: 未盧國). 50 kilometers to the southeast is the country of Ito (Ch:伊都國). 10 kilometres to the southeast is the country of Nu (Ch:奴國). 10 kilometers to the east is the country of Bumi (Ch:不彌國). 20 days to the south by boat is the country of Touma (Ch:投馬國). 10 days to the south by boat or one month by land is the country of Yamatai (邪馬臺國). There resides the King of the Wa people."

=== The State of Wenshen ===
"The country of Wenshen (Note: Wénshēn-guó (文身國), literally "mark-body country," i.e. country of tattooed people) is 7,000 li (500 kilometers) north-east of the country of Wa. Over their body, they have tattoos depicting wild beasts. They have three tattooed marks on their foreheads. The marks are straight for noble people, and they are small for lowly people. The people like music, but are not very generous in spite of their affluence, and do not give anything to strangers. They have houses, but no castles. The place in which their king resides is decorated with gold and silver in a manner of rare beauty. The buildings are surrounded by a ditch, about one cho in width, which they fill with quicksilver. When there is rain, it flows on top of the quicksilver. They have many rare things in their markets. Those who are guilty of a light offence are immediately punished with leather whips. Those who commit crimes punishable by death are made to be eaten by ferocious beasts; if there has been any error, then the ferocious beasts will avoid and not eat the victim. Crimes can also be redeemed through imprisonment without food."

=== The State of Dahan ===
"The people of Dahan (Note: Dàhàn-guó (大漢國), literally "great Han country") are 5,000 li (400 kilometers) east of Wenshen. They do not have an army and are not aggressive. Their manners are the same as those of the country of Wenshen, but their language differs."

== Contents ==
=== Annals (本紀) ===
#	Title	Translation	Notes
Volume 1	本紀第1 武帝上	Emperor Wu	
Volume 2	本紀第2 武帝中	Emperor Wu	
Volume 3	本紀第3 武帝下	Emperor Wu	
Volume 4	本紀第4 簡文帝	Emperor Jianwen	
Volume 5	本紀第5 元帝	Emperor Yuan	
Volume 6	本紀第6 敬帝	Emperor Jing	

=== Biographies (列傳) ===
#	Title	Translation	Notes
Volume 7	列傳第1 皇后	Empresses	Empress Zhang; Empress Chi; Empress Wang; Consort Ding; Consort Ruan; Princess Xu
Volume 8	列傳第2 昭明太子 哀太子 愍懷太子	Crown Prince Zhaoming; Crown Prince Ai; Crown Prince Minhuai	
Volume 9	列傳第3 王茂 曹景宗 柳慶遠	Wang Mao; Cao Jingzong; Liu Qingyuan	
Volume 10	列傳第4 蕭穎達 夏侯詳 蔡道恭 楊公則 鄧元起	Xiao Yingda; Xiahou Jiang; Cai Daogong; Yang Gongze; Deng Yuanqi	
Volume 11	列傳第5 張弘策 庾域 鄭紹叔 呂僧珍	Zhang Hongce; Yu Yu; Zheng Shaoshu; Lü Sengzhen	
Volume 12	列傳第6 柳惔 弟忱 席闡文 韋叡 族弟愛	Liu Tan; Liu Chen; Xi Chanwen; Wei Rui; Wei Ai	
Volume 13	列傳第7 范雲 沈約	Fan Yun; Shen Yue	
Volume 14	列傳第8 江淹 任昉	Jiang Yan; Ren Fang	
Volume 15	列傳第9 謝朏 弟子覽	Xie Fei; Xie Lan	
Volume 16	列傳第10 王亮 張稷 王瑩	Wang Liang; Zhang Ji; Wang Ying	
Volume 17	列傳第11 王珍國 馬仙琕 張齊	Wang Zhenguo; Ma Xianpin; Zhang Qi	
Volume 18	列傳第12 張惠紹 馮道根 康絢 昌義之	Zhang Huishao; Feng Daogen; Kang Xuan; Chang Yizhi	
Volume 19	列傳第13 宗夬 劉坦 樂藹	Zong Guai; Liu Tan; Yue Ai	
Volume 20	列傳第14 劉季連 陳伯之	Liu Lijian; Chen Bozhi	
Volume 21	列傳第15 王瞻 王志 王峻 王暕 子訓 王泰 王份 孫鍚 僉 張充 柳惲 蔡撙 江蒨	Wang Zhan; Wang Zhi; Wang Jun; Wang Jian; Wang Xun; Wang Tai; Wang Fen; Wang Yang; Zhang Chong; Liu Yun; Cai Zun; Jiang Qian	
Volume 22	列傳第16 太祖五王	Five Princes of Taizu	Brothers of Emperor Wu
Volume 23	列傳第17 長沙嗣王業 永陽嗣王伯游 衡陽嗣王元簡 桂陽嗣王象	Ye, Prince of Changsha; Boyou, Prince of Yongyang; Yuanjian, Prince of Hengyang; Xiang, Prince of Guiyang	Nephews of Emperor Wu
Volume 24	列傳第18 蕭景 弟昌 昂 昱	Xiao Jing; Xiao Chang; Xiao Ang; Xiao Yu	
Volume 25	列傳第19 周捨 徐勉	Zhou She; Xu Mian	
Volume 26	列傳第20 范岫 傅昭 弟映 蕭琛 陸杲	Fan Xiu; Fu Zhao; Fu Ying; Xiao Chen; Lu Gao	
Volume 27	列傳第21 陸倕 到洽 明山賓 殷鈞 陸襄	Lu Chui; Dao Qia; Ming Shanbin; Yin Jun;	
Volume 28	列傳第22 裴邃 兄子之高 之平 之橫 夏侯亶 弟夔 魚弘附 韋放	Pei Sui; Pei Zhigao; Pei Zhiping; Pei Zhiheng; Xiahou Dan; Xiahou Kui; Yu Hongfu; Wei Fang	
Volume 29	列傳第23 高祖三王	Three Princes of Gaozu	Sons of Emperor Wu
Volume 30	列傳第24 裴子野 顧協 徐摛 鮑泉	Pei Ziye; Gu Xie; Xu Chi; Bao Quan	
Volume 31	列傳第25 袁昂 子君正	Yuan Ang; Yuan Junzheng	
Volume 32	列傳第26 陳慶之 蘭欽	Chen Qingzhi; Lan Qin	
Volume 33	列傳第27 王僧孺 張率 劉孝綽 王筠	Wang Sengru; Zhang Shuai; Liu Xiaochuo	
Volume 34	列傳第28 張緬 弟纘 綰	Zhang Mian; Zhang Zuan; Zhang Wan	
Volume 35	列傳第29 蕭子恪 弟子範 子顯 子雲	Xiao Zike; Xiao Zifan; Xiao Zixian; Xiao Ziyun	
Volume 36	列傳第30 孔休源 江革	Kong Xiuyuan; Jiang Ge	
Volume 37	列傳第31 謝舉 何敬容	Xie Ju; He Jingrong	
Volume 38	列傳第32 朱异 賀琛	Zhu Yi; He Chen	
Volume 39	列傳第33 元法僧 元樹 元願達 王神念 楊華 羊侃 子鶤 羊鴉仁	Yuan Faseng; Yuan Shu; Yuan Yuanda; Wang Shenian; Yang Hua; Yang Kan; Yang Yun; Yang Yaren	
Volume 40	列傳第34 司馬褧 到漑 劉顯 劉之遴 弟之享 許懋	Sima Jiong; Dao Gai; Liu Xian; Liu Zhilin; Liu Zhixian; Xu Mao	
Volume 41	列傳第35 王規 劉瑴 宗懍 王承 褚翔 蕭介 從父兄洽 褚球 劉孺 弟覽 遵 劉潛 弟孝勝 孝威 孝先 殷芸 蕭幾	Wang Gui; Liu Jue; Zong Lin; Wang Cheng; Chu Xiang; Xiao Jie; Xiao Qia; Chu Qiu; Liu Ru; Liu Lan; Liu Zun; Liu Qian; Liu Xiaosheng; Liu Xiaowei; Liu Xiaoxian; Yin Yun; Xiao Ji	
Volume 42	列傳第36 臧盾 弟厥 傅岐	Zang Dun; Zang Jue; Fu Qi	
Volume 43	列傳第37 韋粲 江子一 弟子四 子五 張嵊 沈浚 柳敬禮	Wei Can; Jiang Ziyi; Jiang Zisi; Jiang Ziwu; Zhang Sheng; Shen Jun; Liu Jingli	
Volume 44	列傳第38 太宗十一王 世祖二子	Eleven Princes of Taizong; Two Princes of Shizu	Sons of Emperor Jianwen; Sons of Emperor Yuan
Volume 45	列傳第39 王僧辯	Wang Sengbian	
Volume 46	列傳第40 胡僧祐 徐文盛 杜崱 兄岸 弟幼安 兄子龕 陰子春	Hu Sengyou; Xu Wensheng; Du Ze; Du An; Du You'an; Du Kan; Yin Zichun	
Volume 47	列傳第41 孝行	Filial Acts	Teng Tangong; Shen Chongsu; Xun Jiang; Yu Qianlou; Ji Fen; Zhen Tian; Han Huaiming; Liu Tanjing; He Jiong; Yu Shami; Jiang Fou; Liu Ji; Chu Xiu; Xie Lin
Volume 48	列傳第42 儒林	Forest of Scholars	Fu Manrong; He Tongzhi; Fan Chen; Yan Zhizhi; He Yang, He Ge; Sima Yun; Bian Hua; Cui Lingen; Kong Qina; Lu Guang; Shen Jun; Taishi Shuming; Kong Ziqu; Huang Kan
Volume 49	列傳第43 文學上	Writers	Dao Hang; Qiu Chi; Liu Bao; Yuan Jun; Yu Yuling; Yu Jianwu; Liu Zhao; He Xun; Zhong Rong; Zhou Xingsi; Wu Jun
Volume 50	列傳第44 文學下	Writers	Liu Jun; Liu Zhao; Xie Jiqing; Liu Xie; Wang Ji; He Sichen; Liu Yao; Xie Zheng; Zang Yan; Fu Ting; Yu Zhongrong; Lu Yungong; Ren Xiaogong; Yan Xie
Volume 51	列傳第45 處士	Retired Gentlemen	He Dian; He Yin; Ruan Xiaoxu; Tao Hongjing; Zhuge Qu; Shen Yi; Liu Huifei; Fan Yuanyan; Liu Xu; Liu Xiao; Yu Shen; Zhang Xiaoxiu; Yu Chengxian
Volume 52	列傳第46 止足	The Self-Sufficient	Gu Xianzhi; Tao Jizhi; Xiao Shisu
Volume 53	列傳第47 良吏	Good Officials	Yu Bi; Shen Yu; Fan Shuceng; Qiu Zhongfu; Sun Qian; Fu Xuan; He Yuan
Volume 54	列傳第48 諸夷	The Various Barbarians	Various States South of the Sea: Linyi; Funan; Panpan; Dandan; Gantuoli; Langyaxiu; Poli; Central Tianzhu; Shizi Various Rong of the Eastern Yi: Gaogouli; Baiji; Xinluo; Wo; Wenshen; Dahan; Fusang; Various Rong to the West and North Henan; Gaochang; Hua; Zhouguke; Hebatan; Humidan; Baiti; Qiuci; Yutian; Kepantuo; Mo; Bosi; Dangchang; Dengzhi; Wuxing; Rourou
Volume 55	列傳第49 豫章王綜 武陵王紀 臨賀王正德 河東王譽	Zong, Prince of Yuzhang; Ji, Prince of Wuling; Zhengde, Prince of Linhe; Yu, Prince of Hedong	
Volume 56	列傳第50 侯景	Hou Jing	

== See also ==
- Twenty-Four Histories
- Fusang
- Jinping Commandery
