= Longwen Bianying =

Longwen Bianying (simplified Chinese: 龙文鞭影; traditional Chinese: 龍文鞭影; pinyin: lóngwén biānyǐng) is a Ming dynasty Classical Chinese primer written by Yang Chenzheng (楊臣諍) and Xiao Liangyou (萧良有). The name roughly translates to "Longwen's Whip-Shadow" or, more idiomatically, "The Shadow of Longwen's Whip". It is written with the aim of teaching Classical Chinese poetic meter and allusion. It is written with four-character parallel lines according to the pingshui rhyme scheme.

== Name ==
Longwen Bianying was originally named Mengyang Gushi (Stories for Young Children). Yang Chenzheng had read Mengyang Gushi and reviewed it as having too few historical accounts and that Xia Guangwen (夏廣文) had left the annotations too incomplete or erroneous. He then edited and expanded on the text to produce Longwen Bianying, with the title itself referencing a legendary horse mentioned in texts like the Book of Han. The idea is that such a fine horse, upon seeing the shadow of a whip, immediately gallops, not needing the whip's impact to set it off.It also carries an allusion to the idiom wàngzǐ-chénglóng 望子成龍 "One's son becomes a dragon" which refers to the hope of one's child being successful in the future.

== Contents ==
The entire text is composed of 1,046 four-character phrases, with two sentences juxtaposed into 523 couplets, each carrying a pair of parallel stories and allusions. For example, the phrase 伍員覆楚，勾踐滅吳 "Wu Zixu overthrew Chu, Goujian destroyed Wu" refers to the stories of Wu Zixu destroying the state of Chu and Goujian destroying King Fuchai of Wu. These are two different stories, but they are related.

== See also ==
- Three Character Classic
- Thousand Character Classic
- Youxue Qionglin
- Five Character Mirror
- Ahakp'yŏn
