= Twenty-Four Histories =

Collection of official Chinese histories

- Chinese: 二十四史
Transcriptions
Standard Mandarin
- Hanyu Pinyin: Èrshísì shǐ
Yue: Cantonese
- Jyutping: Ji6sap6sei3 Si2
Southern Min
- Hokkien POJ: Jī-cha̍p-sì-sú (col.); Jī-si̍p-sù-sú (lit.)

The Twenty-Four Histories, also known as the Orthodox Histories (正史; Zhèngshǐ), are a collection of official histories detailing the dynasties of China, from the legendary Three Sovereigns and Five Emperors in the 4th millennium BC to the Ming dynasty in the 17th century.

The Han dynasty historian Sima Qian established many conventions of the genre, though its form was not standardized until much later. Starting with the Tang dynasty, each dynasty established an official office to write the history of its predecessor using official court records, partly in order to establish its own link to the earliest times. As fixed and edited in the Qing dynasty, the whole set contains 3,213 volumes and about 40 million words. It is considered one of the most important sources on Chinese history and culture.

The title Twenty-Four Histories dates from 1775, which was the 40th year in the reign of the Qianlong Emperor. This was when the last volume, the History of Ming was reworked and a complete set of the histories was produced.

== History ==
The idea of compiling a collection of Chinese official histories dates back to the Three Kingdoms era, when the Three Histories consisted of Shiji, Book of Han, and Dongguan Hanji. Book of the Later Han would later gradually replace the Dongguan Hanji. After the Records of the Three Kingdoms appeared, it was soon tacked on to produce the Early Four Historiographies (前四史).

By the Tang dynasty, the ten official histories starting from Records of the Three Kingdoms and ending with Book of Sui were collectively called the Ten Histories. Combined with the earlier three, they make the Thirteen Histories. Two Tang scholars have written works based on the Thirteen Histories: Criticism of the Thirteen Histories by Wu Wuling (20 volumes) and Index of the Thirteen Histories by Song Jian (10 volumes).

During the Song dynasty, on top of on the Thirteen Histories, History of the Southern Dynasties, History of the Northern Dynasties, New Book of Tang, and New History of the Five Dynasties were added to form the Seventeen Histories. Northern Song's Wang Ling (Song Dynasty) wrote Master Wang's Enlightenment on the Seventeen Histories, and Southern Song's Lü Zuqian wrote Detailed Excerpts of the Seventeen Histories.

The Twenty-One Histories was formed during the Ming dynasty. Qing dynasty's Gu Yanwu wrote in Daily Knowledge Records: Official Edition of Twenty-One Histories (日知錄·監本二十一史): "In Song times there were only seventeen histories, now with the addition of the histories of Song, Liao, Jin, and Yuan, there are twenty-one histories."

During the Yongzheng period of the Qing dynasty, after the completion of the History of Ming, they were collectively known as the Twenty-Two Histories, and Zhao Yi's Notes on the Twenty-Two Histories was named accordingly. Later, with the addition of the Old Book of Tang, it became the Twenty-Three Histories. When compiling the Complete Library in Four Sections, the Old History of the Five Dynasties, which was extracted from the Yongle Encyclopedia, was also included, making it the Twenty-Four Histories.

== Collection ==
| Title | Year | Dynasty | Main authors | Series |
|---|---|---|---|---|
| Shiji 史記 | 91 BC | Three Sovereigns and Five Emperors; Xia; Shang; Zhou; Qin; Han until Emperor Wu | Sima Qian (Han) | Early Four Historiographies 前四史 |
| Book of Han 漢書 | 82 AD | Western Han; Xin dynasty | Ban Gu (Han) | Early Four Historiographies 前四史 |
| Records of the Three Kingdoms 三國誌 (Note: Greatly expanded by the later Annotated Records of the Three Kingdoms) | 289 | Cao Wei; Shu Han; Eastern Wu | Chen Shou (Western Jin) | Early Four Historiographies 前四史 |
| Book of the Later Han 後漢書 | 445 | Eastern Han | Fan Ye (Liu Song) | Early Four Historiographies 前四史 |
| Book of Song 宋書 | 488 | Liu Song | Shen Yue (Liang) | —N/a |
| Book of Southern Qi 南齊書 | 537 | Southern Qi | Xiao Zixian (Liang) | —N/a |
| Book of Wei 魏書 | 554 | Northern Wei; Eastern Wei | Wei Shou (Northern Qi) | —N/a |
| Book of Liang 梁書 | 636 | Liang | Yao Silian (Tang) | Eight Tang Historiographies 唐初八史 |
| Book of Chen 陳書 | 636 | Chen | Yao Silian (Tang) | Eight Tang Historiographies 唐初八史 |
| Book of Northern Qi 北齊書 | 636 | Northern Qi | Li Baiyao (Tang) | Eight Tang Historiographies 唐初八史 |
| Book of Zhou 周書 | 636 | Western Wei; Northern Zhou | Linghu Defen (Tang) | Eight Tang Historiographies 唐初八史 |
| Book of Sui 隋書 | 636 | Sui | Wei Zheng (Tang) | Eight Tang Historiographies 唐初八史 |
| Book of Jin 晉書 | 648 | Western Jin; Eastern Jin | Fang Xuanling (Tang) | Eight Tang Historiographies 唐初八史 |
| History of the Southern Dynasties 南史 | 659 | Liu Song; Southern Qi; Liang; Chen | Li Yanshou (Tang) | Eight Tang Historiographies 唐初八史 |
| History of the Northern Dynasties 北史 | 659 | Northern Wei; Eastern Wei; Western Wei; Northern Qi; Northern Zhou; Sui | Li Yanshou (Tang) | Eight Tang Historiographies 唐初八史 |
| Old Book of Tang 舊唐書 | 945 | Tang | Liu Xu (Later Jin) | —N/a |
| Old History of the Five Dynasties 舊五代史 | 974 | Later Liang; Later Tang; Later Jin; Later Han; Later Zhou | Xue Juzheng (Song) | —N/a |
| Historical Records of the Five Dynasties 五代史記 | 1053 | Later Liang; Later Tang; Later Jin; Later Han; Later Zhou | Ouyang Xiu (Song) | —N/a |
| New Book of Tang 新唐書 | 1060 | Tang dynasty | Ouyang Xiu (Song) | —N/a |
| History of Liao 遼史 | 1343 | Liao; Qara Khitai | Toqto'a (Yuan) | Three Yuan Historiographies 元末三史 |
| History of Jin 金史 | 1345 | Jin dynasty | Toqto'a (Yuan) | Three Yuan Historiographies 元末三史 |
| History of Song 宋史 | 1345 | Northern Song; Southern Song | Toqto'a (Yuan) | Three Yuan Historiographies 元末三史 |
| History of Yuan 元史 | 1370 | Yuan | Song Lian (Ming) | —N/a |
| History of Ming 明史 | 1739 | Ming | Zhang Tingyu (Qing) | —N/a |

=== Inheritance works ===
These works were begun by one historian and completed by an heir, usually of the next generation.

- The Shiji, inherited from Sima Tan by Sima Qian
- Book of Han, inherited from Ban Biao, Ban Gu by Ban Zhao
- Book of Liang and Book of Chen, inherited from Yao Cha (姚察) by Yao Silian
- Book of Northern Qi, inherited from Li Delin by Li Baiyao
- History of the Southern Dynasties and History of the Northern Dynasties, inherited from Li Dashi by Li Yanshou (李延壽)

=== Related works ===
There were attempts at producing new traditional histories after the fall of the Qing dynasty, but they either never gained widespread acceptance as part of the official historical canon or they remain unfinished.

| Title | Year | Dynasty | Main authors |
|---|---|---|---|
| New History of Yuan 新元史 | 1927 | Yuan | Ke Shaomin (Republic of China) |
| Draft History of Qing 清史稿 | 1920 | Qing | Zhao Erxun (Republic of China) |

=== Modern attempts at creating the official Qing history ===
In 1961, to commemorate the 50th anniversary of the declaration of the Republic of China (ROC), the ROC government in Taiwan published the History of Qing, adding 21 supplementary chapters to the Draft History of Qing and revising many existing chapters to remove derogatory passages towards the 1911 Revolution and denounce the People's Republic of China (PRC) as illegitimate. This edition has not been widely accepted as the official Qing history because it is recognized that it was a rushed job motivated by political objectives. It does not correct most of the errors known to exist in the Draft History of Qing.

An additional project, attempting to write a New History of Qing incorporating new materials and improvements in historiography, lasted from 1988 to 2000. Only 33 chapters out of the projected 500 were published. This project was later abandoned following the rise of the Taiwanese nationalist Pan-Green Coalition, which argues that it is not the duty of Taiwan to compile the history of mainland China.

In 1961, the PRC also attempted to complete the Qing history, but historians were prevented from doing so against the backdrop of the Cultural Revolution.

In 2002, the PRC once again announced that it would complete the History of Qing. The project was approved in 2002, and put under the leadership of historian Dai Yi. Initially planned to be completed in 10 years, the project suffered multiple delays, pushing completion of the first draft to 2016. Chinese Social Sciences Today reported in April 2020 that the project's results were being reviewed. However, in 2023, the manuscript was reportedly rejected, and there are also rumors that the project has been indefinitely halted.

== Modern editions ==
In China, the Zhonghua Book Company have edited a number of these histories. They have been collated, edited, and punctuated by Chinese specialists. From 1991 to 2003, it was translated from Literary Chinese into modern written vernacular Chinese, by Xu Jialu and other scholars.

== Translations ==
One of the Twenty-Four Histories is in the process of being fully translated into English: Records of the Grand Historian by William Nienhauser, in nine volumes.

In Korean and Vietnamese, only the Records has been translated. Most of the histories have been translated into Japanese.

== See also ==
- Chinese classic texts
- Draft History of Qing, a continuation of the histories through 1911
- History of China
- Official communications in imperial China
- Zizhi Tongjian
- Five Character Mirror, a Ming dynasty children's primer in Literary Chinese abbreviating the 24 histories.
