= Five Character Mirror =

The Five-Character Mirror (simplified Chinese: 五字鉴; traditional Chinese: 五字鑒; pinyin: wǔzì jiàn), originally named Proper Commentaries to the Concise Mirror (simplified Chinese: 鉴略妥注; traditional Chinese: 鑒略妥注; pinyin: jiànlüè tuǒzhù), is a Ming dynasty children's primer compiling the history of China from the Three Sovereigns and Five Emperors period up to the Ming dynasty. It was written by Li Tingji (李廷機), courtesy name Erzhang (爾張), and Zou Shengmai (鄒聖脉), the latter of whom supplemented the text with annotations and Qing dynasty content.

== Contents ==
The text is written in Literary Chinese 5-character rhymed pingshui verse, each line containing allusions to historical events recorded in various Chinese classics. The Three Sovereigns and Five Emperors period up to the Yuan dynasty was written by Li Tingji, whereas the Ming and Qing dynasties were handled by Zou Shengmai. Given the breadth of content involved, it can be seen as an abbreviated version of the Twenty-Four Histories.

== See also ==
- Three Character Classic
- Thousand Character Classic
- Youxue Qionglin
- Longwen Bianying
- Ahakp'yŏn
