= National Treasure (Chinese TV series) =

- Traditional Chinese: 國家寶藏
- Simplified Chinese: 国家宝藏
- Hanyu Pinyin: Guójiā Bǎozàng
- Genre: Cultural exploration TV program
- Presented by: Zhang Guoli
- Starring: Li Chen; Wang Kai; Tony Leung Ka-fai; Duan Yihong; Sa Beining; Wang Gang; Liu Tao; Cai Guoqing; Lei Jiayin; Liu Yijun; Ma Su; Guo Tao
- Country of origin: China
- Original language: Mandarin
- No. of seasons: 1
- No. of episodes: 10

Production
- Executive producer: Lǚ Yitao
- Production location: Beijing
- Production companies: CCTV International Media Co., Ltd.

Original release
- Network: CCTV-3; CCTV-1
- Release: December 3, 2017

National Treasure (Chinese: 国家宝藏) is a 2017 Chinese cultural exploration variety TV program that aired on CCTV-3 and CCTV-1 in China. The TV program is produced by Lü Yitao. Actor Zhang Guoli serves as the host. The Palace Museum, Shanghai Museum, Nanjing Museum, Hunan Provincial Museum, Henan Museum, Shaanxi History Museum, Hubei Provincial Museum, Zhejiang Provincial Museum and Liaoning Provincial Museum, the nine major museums in mainland China, each presented three national treasures across the episodes. Each treasure in the TV program will be presented by national treasure keepers performed by celebrities and common people, to tell the stories of national treasures with the collections, interpreting the historical mystery.

== Episodes ==
No.	Title	Original release date
1	"Palace Museum" (故宫博物院)	December 3, 2017
The panoramic painting of Rivers and Mountains by Wang Ximeng (1096–1119) in the Song dynasty (960-1279) (王希孟《千里江山图》); Large Vase with Variegated Glazes (各种釉彩大瓶); Stone Drum (石鼓). Li Chen, Wang Kai and Tony Leung Ka-fai played roles of national treasure keepers. Li Chen, acting as Emperor Huizong (1082-1135) of Song dynasty (960-1279), presented the historical background of the painting A Panorama of Rivers and Mountains. Wang Kai, acting as Qianlong Emperor (1711-1799) in the Qing dynasty (1644-1911), presented the historical background of Large Vase with Variegated Glazes. Tony Leung Ka-fai, acting as Sima Guang, presented the historical background of the Stone Drum.
2	"Hubei Provincial Museum" (湖北省博物馆)	December 10, 2017
The Sword of Goujian (越王勾践剑); Shuihudi Qin bamboo texts (睡虎地秦墓竹简); Bianzhong of Marquis Yi of Zeng (曾侯乙编钟). Duan Yihong, Sa Beining and Wang Gang played roles of national treasure keepers. Duan Yihong, presented the historical background of the Sword of Goujian. Sa Beining, presented the historical background of the Shuihudi Qin bamboo texts. Wang Gang, presented the historical background of the Bianzhong of Marquis Yi of Zeng.
3	"Henan Provincial Museum" (河南省博物院)	December 17, 2017
Fuhao Xiao Bat (妇好鴞尊); Jiahu Gudi (贾湖骨笛); Yunwen Tongjin (云纹铜禁). Liu Tao, Cai Guoqing and Lei Jiayin played roles of national treasure keepers. Liu Tao, acting as Fu Hao (died c. 1200 BC), presented the historical background of Fuhao Bat. Cai Guoqing, acting as ancient people along with other actors, presented the historical background of Jiahu Gudi. Lei Jiayin, acting as the Lingyi of Chu State, presented the historical background of Yunwen Tongjin.
4	"Shaanxi History Museum" (陕西历史博物馆)	December 24, 2017
Duhu Fu (杜虎符); Putao Huaniaowen Yinxiangnang (葡萄花鸟纹银香囊); Yide Taizimu Quelou Yizhangtu Bihua (懿德太子墓阙楼仪仗图壁画). Liu Yijun, Ma Su and Guo Tao played roles of national treasure keepers. Liu Yijun, presented the historical background of Duhu Fu. Ma Su, presented the historical background of Putao Huaniaowen Yinxiangnang. Guo Tao, presented the historical background of Yide Taizimu Quelou Yizhangtu Bihua.
5	"Liaoning Museum" (辽宁省博物馆)	January 17, 2018
Nymph of the Luo River (洛神赋图); Gilt-bronze Stirrup (铜鎏金木芯马镫); Wansui Tongtian Tie (万岁通天帖). Chen Xiao, Ye Luying, Guan Xiaotong, Hua Tian, Ning Jing and Dong Baohou played roles of national treasure keepers. Chen Xiao and Ye Luying, presented the historical background of Nymph of the Luo River. Guan Xiaotong and Hua Tian, presented the historical background of Gilt-bronze Stirrup. Ning Jing and Dong Baohou, presented the historical background of Wansui Tongtian Tie.
6	"Hunan Museum" (湖南省博物馆)	January 14, 2018
Celadon Glaze Pot of Brown Color (长沙窑青釉褐彩诗文执壶); T-shaped Painting on Silk from Xin Zhui's Tomb (辛追墓T形帛画); Min Fang Lei (皿方罍). He Jiong, Lin An, Lei Jia, Li Jianmao, Huang Tingting, Liao Dan and Tan Guobin played roles of national treasure keepers. He Jiong and Lin An, presented the historical background of Celadon Glaze Pot of Brown Color. Lei Jia, Li Jianmao and Huangtingting, presented the historical background of T-shaped Painting on Silk from Xin Zhui's Tomb. Liao Dan and Tan Guobin, presented the historical background of Min Fang Lei.
7	"Shanghai Museum" (上海博物馆)	January 21, 2018
Shang Yang Commercial Scale (商鞅方升); Ducks in the Lotus Pond (莲塘乳鸭图); Da Ke Ding (大克鼎). Huang Lei, Fang Xiang, Na Ying, Ma Huijuan, Xiao Feng, Jackson Yee, Xu Yongxiang and Pan Yuyi played roles of national treasure keepers. Huang Lei and Fang Xiang, presented the historical background of Shang Yang Fang Sheng. Na Ying, Ma Huijuan and Xiao Feng, presented the historical background of Ducks in the Lotus Pond. Jackson Yee, Xu Yongxiang and Pan Yuyi, presented the historical background of Da Ke Ding.
8	"Zhejiang Museum" (浙江省博物馆)	January 28, 2018
Wangong Palanquin (万工轿); Guqin (彩凤鸣岐七弦琴); Jade Cong (玉琮). Ren Zhong, Yin Shuo, Wang Xiaoying, Sun Chun, Ding Chengyun, Fan Peiling, Zhou Dongyu, Qu Yi and Archaeologists of Liangchu Cultural Site played roles of national treasure keepers. Ren Zhong, Yin Shuo and Wang Xiaoying, presented the historical background of Wangong Palanquin. Sun Chun, Ding Chengyun and Fan Peiling, presented the historical background of Guqin. Zhou Dongyu and Archaeologists of Liangchu Cultural Site, presented the historical background of Jade Cong.
9	"Nanjing Museum" (南京博物院)	February 24, 2018
Archway of Glazed Pagoda in Great Bao'en Temple (大报恩寺琉璃塔拱门); Great Universal Geographic Map (坤舆万国全图); Paintings on Bricks of Tombs (竹林七贤与荣启期砖画). Qin Hailu, Pan Guping, Chang Chen-kuang, Gao Jun, Yuan Hong, Geng Shuo, Gao Mengshen and Students and Teachers of Daishan Experimental Primary School played roles of national treasure keepers. Qin Hailu and Pan Guping, presented the historical background of the Archway of Glazed Pagoda in Great Bao'en Temple. Chang Chen-kuang and Gao Jun, presented the historical background of Great Universal Geographic Map. Yuan Hong, Geng Shuo and Students and Teachers of Daishan Experimental Primary School, presented the historical background of the Paintings on Bricks of Tombs.

== Music ==
- One Eye for a Thousand Years (《一眼千年》), sung by Na Ying.

== Reception ==
The TV program received mainly positive reviews. On Douban, the TV program has a score of 94 out of 100.

It won Best Variety Program (Seasonal) at 24th Shanghai Television Festival.
