= Jinping Commandery =

Chinese name
- Chinese: 晉平郡
Transcriptions

Korean name
- Hangul: 진평군
- Hanja: 晉平郡

Jinping Commandery (Korean: 진평군; Hanja: 晉平郡) was the territory of Baekje in Liaoxi of China. It appeared in history books of Southern dynasties of China such as Book of Song, Book of Liang and Book of Qi. However its existence is disputed by many historians.

== Outline ==
Book of Song Volume 97

Classical Chinese

百濟國，本與高驪俱在遼東之東千餘里，其後高驪略有遼東，百濟略有遼西。百濟所治，謂之晉平郡晉平縣。

English

The Kingdom of Baekje, together with Goguryeo, were originally located more than one thousand li to the east of Liaodong. Later, Goguryeo occupied Liaodong and Baekje occupied Liaoxi. Baekje's administrative seat was at Jinping Prefecture of Jinping Commandery.

— 宋書 巻九十七

Book of Qi Volume 58

Classical Chinese

魏虜又發騎數十萬攻百濟，入其界，牟大遣將沙法名、贊首流、解禮昆、木干那率眾襲擊虜軍，大破之。

English

Wei again mobilized hundreds of thousands of cavalrymen and attacked into Baekje’s border. Modae sent generals Sha Fa Ming, Zan Shou Liu, Jie Li Kun, Mu Gan Na leading army in a surprise attack against the enemies, and won great victory.

— 南斉書 巻五十八

Book of Liang Volume 54

Classical Chinese

百濟亦據有遼西、晉平二郡地矣，自置百濟郡。

English

Baekje also occupied the territory of two commanderies of Liaoxi and Jinping, and set up Baekje Commandery.

— 梁書 巻五十四

== Controversy ==
The Book of Qi locates Baekje in the south part of Korea. For the Northern Wei to attack Baekje, they need to pass through the sea or cross the territory of Goguryeo. Since Northern Wei and Goguryeo were opposed, it was difficult to pass their territory. Cavalry cannot pass through the sea so if Northern Wei attacked Baekje, Baekje must have had territory in China. Also in Book of Song and Book of Liang, some descriptions can be interpreted that Baekje's territory was in Liaoxi. However, no related historical documents were found in Northern dynasty and no description of Baekje's territory in China appears in Korean history book Samguk sagi and Samgungnyusa.

According to Hideo Inoue, the Japanese and Chinese academic community takes skeptical or negative positions on the existence of Jinping Commandery. It is impossible for the Commandery to survive the time of attacking Baekje by remnants of the defeated army of Northern Yan and attack by Northern Wei. He rejects such articles about Jinping Commandery as “totally misinformed articles” and he “never” bring those articles up.

Inoue pointed out “In Liu Song dynasty, Baekje was highly appreciated as a counter to Goguryeo. In order to control Goguryeo’s alliance with Wei and Yan, it is necessary to exaggerate Baekje’s invasion to Liaoxi”.

In the Korean academic community, the theory that Baekje invaded Liaoxi is still seen as factual. An Ho-sang, who was a director of Ministry of Education in Korea, submitted “A bow of modification of the national history textbook” to the Congress which include the following points: 1) Dangun is a real person in the history. 2) Dangun's had the territory which reach to Beijing, China. 3) Wanggeom-seong was in Liaoning, China. 4) Four Commanderies of Han were in Beijing, China. 5) In 3rd to 7th century, Baekje ruled over east coast of China from Beijing to Shanghai. 6) Silla's first territory was east part of Manchuria and national border of Silla was in Beijing. 7) Baekje established Japanese culture. By 1990, Korean History textbook in high school described that Baekje attacked Liaoxi, but after 1990, it is described and illustrated as follows “Baekje strengthen their navy, invaded Liaoxi district in China, and what’s more they actively reached to Shangxi district and Japan.”

Young (Korean: 연민수) researcher of Northeast Asian History Foundation of the Korean government, found many problems in the description of Baekje's advancement to Liaoxi and Shandong province and Kyusyu in Japan and he criticized them as not germane. “Although it seems that it is based on the Empress Jingu of Nihon Shoki and the description on Seven-Branched Sword, these interpretations have many problems.” Also, he criticizes the above interpretation as “When you use historical documents, you must remove arbitrary interpretation. If we follow Nihon Shoki, which has many problems, the history must be Japan’s advancement to Baekje, not Baekje’s advancement to Japan.” He pointed out problems for Baekje's advancement to Liaoxi and Jinping Commandery's existence. No description of Baekje's advancement to Lisoxi appears in Book of Wei in Northern dynasty. The event happened in the time of Former Qin, Book of Song and Book of Liang in the Southern dynasty. It would be difficult for Baekje to go through Goguryeo's territory, because at that time they had been fighting constantly. Young said, “If we believe everything in Chinese history books, we have to believe the description in records of the war with Wa that Baekje and Silla served to Wa as a great country.”

Junko Miyawaki said this theory was unbelievable. The theory of Baekje's territory in China rely on the history book in Southern dynasties such as Liu Song dynasty, Southern Qi and Liang dynasty. In the book of Southern dynasties, the description about Northern Wei in Northern dynasties are oral tradition level. In Book of Song, there are some descriptions of Baekje, but in Book of Qi, the description of Baekje is squeezed in the chapter of Nanman together with Goguryeo, Gaya and Wa. She criticized that such amount of information is too little to trust. Also, she pointed out that people in that age had little sense of belonging to the country and were freer to move from country to country. In Korea and surrounding areas, people from multiple countries mixed and lived together. At that time, China and Korea shared the same economic zone, that some people moved from Baekje and made a community in Liaoxi.

Shunpei Mizuno tends to think that Baekje possessed territory in China, but that “things are not as easy as imagination”. Based on Chinese history books, the occupation of Liaoxi by Baekje happened from the late 3rd century to the early 5th century, but at that time, Former Yan, Former Qin, Later Yan, Southern Yan, Northern Wei tried to get the land of Liaoxi and even in the most confusing time of the Sixteen Kingdoms and Northern and Southern dynasties, Baekje could not make Liaoxi their territory. Articles related to Jinpyung Commandery were found only in history records of Southern dynasty, which had close relationship with Baekje but nothing in the history books of Southern dynasty.

No records of advancement of Baekje are found in Korean history book Samguk sagi and Samgungnyusa. The records of impingement with Northern Wei are written in Book of Qi. Because of those reasons, Mizuno says “This theory is skeptical in the academic community” and “It cannot be said this theory is widely accepted in the historical academy.” He pointed out that the Southern dynasty put importance on Baekje because their international policy was not to accept their weakening by Northern Wei, which was the strongest competitor. So, they put Baekje into their closed international circle and wrote a history book as Baekje insisted.

== Sources ==
- 井上秀雄 (1972). 古代朝鮮. NHK出版.
- 水野俊平 (2007). 韓vs日「偽史ワールド」. Shogakukan.
