= Lucky Boy =

Lucky Boy may refer to:

== Films ==
- Lucky Boy (1929 film), an American musical comedy-drama film
- Lucky Boy (2017 film), a comedy and coming-of-age film

== Music ==
- "Lucky Boy", a 1987 single by Michiro Endo
- "Lucky Boy", a 1993 song by The Remingtons, from the album Aim for the Heart
- "Lucky Boy", a 1999 song by Matt Nathanson, from the album Still Waiting for Spring
- Lucky Boy, a 2006 album by DJ Mehdi
- "Lucky Boy", a 2006 song by Andrew Winton
- "Lucky Boy", a 2009 song by Jeppe Laursen
- "Lucky Boy", a 2011 song by Amy Lavere, from the album Stranger Me
- "Lucky Boy", a 2016 song by Jett Rebel
- "Lucky Boy", a song from the 1925 stage musical of The Cocoanuts
- "Lucky Boy", a song from the soundtrack for the 2008 film Bachna Ae Haseeno

== People ==
- Wale Omotoso, a Nigerian boxer nicknamed "Luckyboy"
- Muwiya Oshode, a Nigerian footballer nicknamed "Lucky Boy"
- "Lucky Boy", a pseudonym used by Ken Laszlo

== Animals ==
- Lucky Boy, a horse who was part of the medal-winning Swedish team at the Equestrian: team dressage event at the 1972 Summer Olympics
- Lucky Boy Boy, the winner of the 1963 English Greyhound Derby
- Fu Zai, a dog whose name roughly translates to "Lucky Boy"

== Other uses ==
- Lucky Boy (novel), a 2017 novel by Shanthi Sekaran
- Lucky Boy, Nevada, a ghost town in Mineral County, Nevada
- "Lucky Boy", a fishing vessel wrecked in 1955
- "Lucky Boy", a fen in the Wallops Island National Wildlife Refuge
