= Qu Yi =

Qu Yi may refer to:

- Quyi, traditional Chinese storytelling and oral narrative arts
- Qu Yi (general) (fl. 190s), general under the warlord Yuan Shao during the late Han dynasty
- Qu Yi (actor) (born 1992), Chinese musical actor
