= Liu Zixuan =

Liu Zixuan may refer to:

- Liu Zhiji (661–721), courtesy name Zixuan, Tang dynasty literati and historian
- Jesseca Liu (born 1979), Malaysian actress
