= Lei (vessel) =

Type of Ancient Chinese wine jar

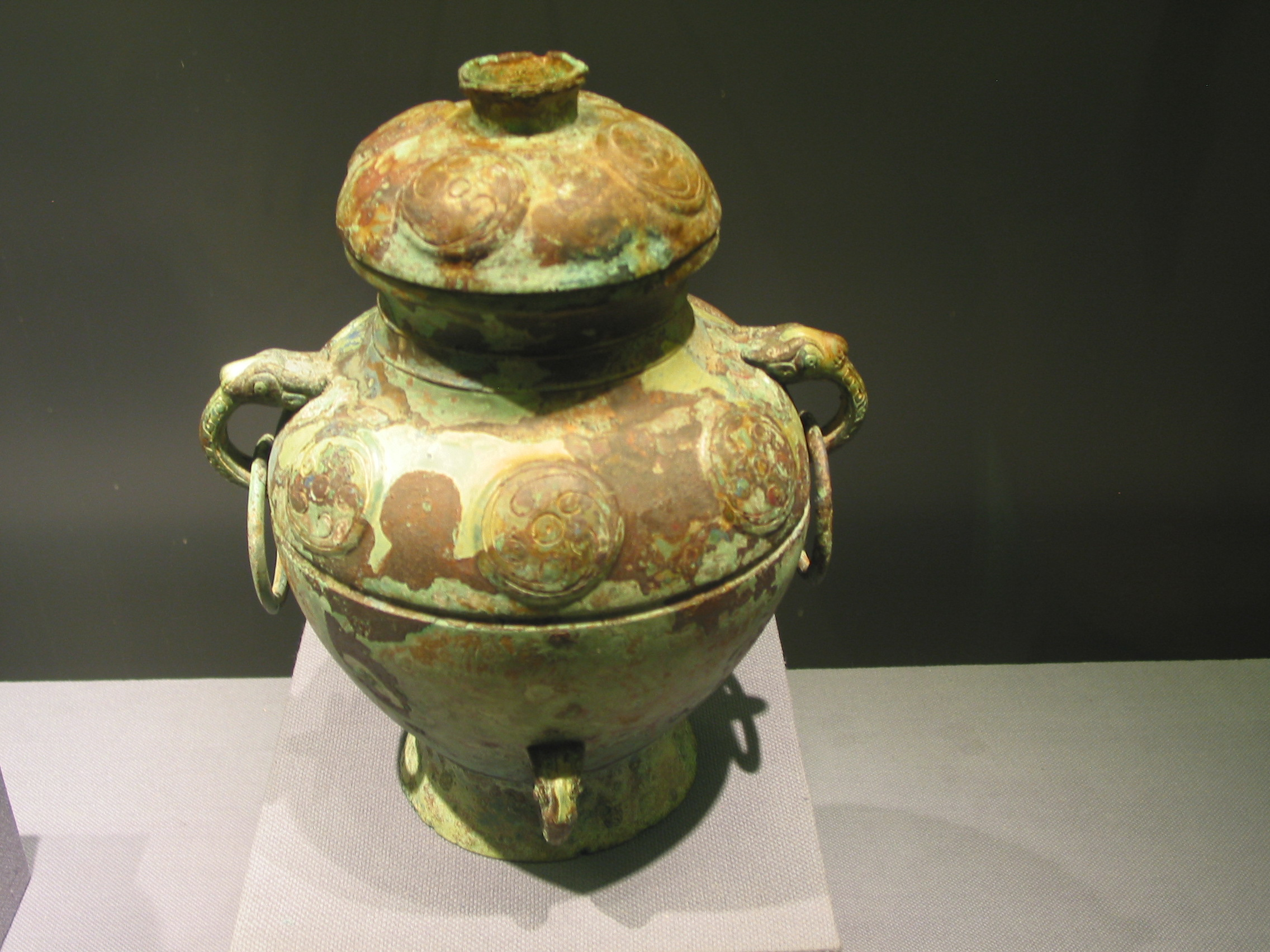
A ke lei made by the State of Yan during the Western Zhou period, with inscriptions recording that the King of Zhou appointed the Duke of Shao to Yan.

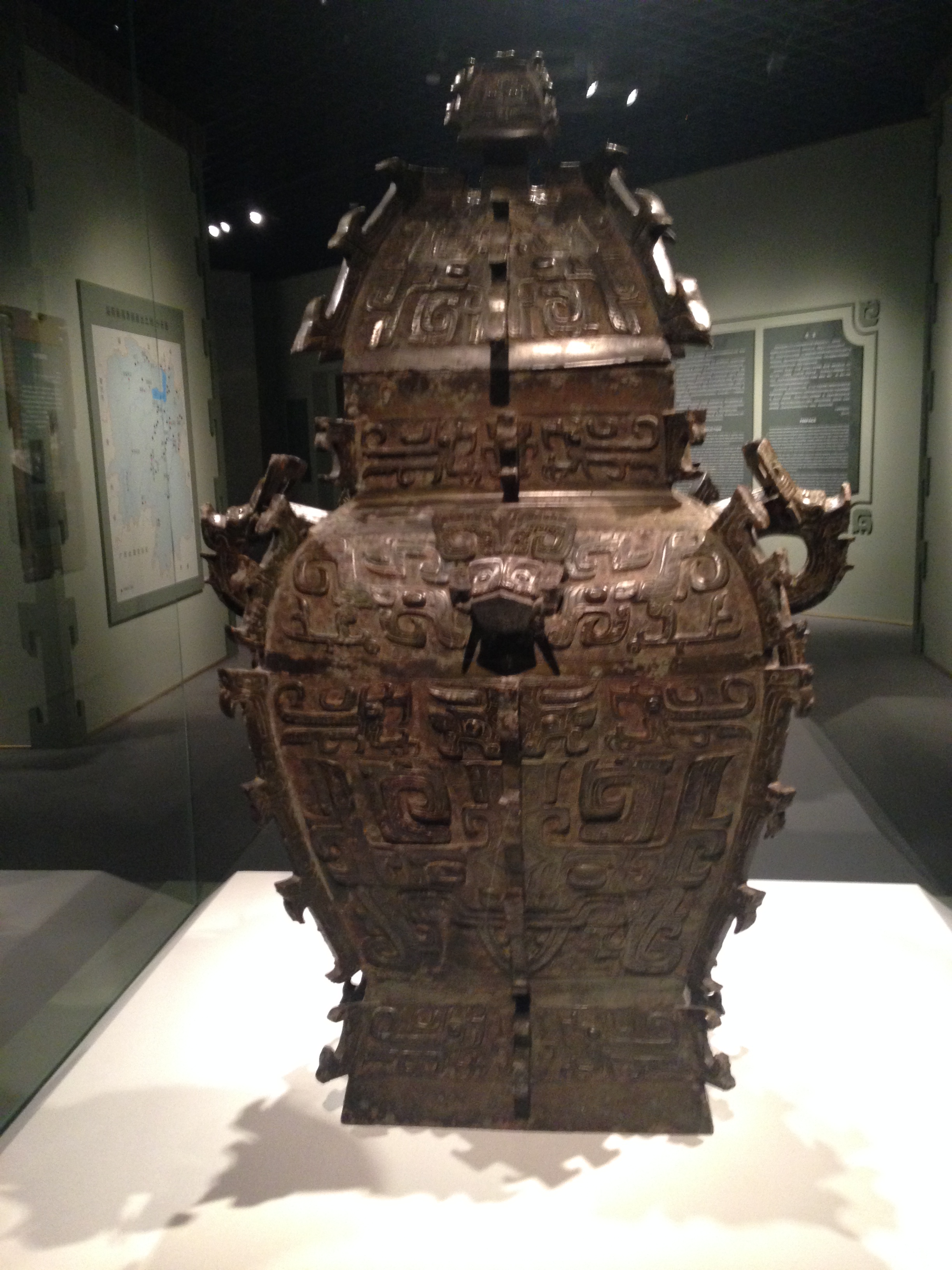
A min fanglei from the late Shang dynasty, among the largest lei vessels unearthed.

A lei (Chinese: 罍; pinyin: léi) is a large bronze wine jar used from the late Shang dynasty period to the Eastern Zhou dynasty period in ancient China, with a characteristic double-eared and narrow-necked shape. They come in square and round varieties, with the former used by the Shang, and the latter used by both the Shang and Zhou. Over time, the form of the lei gradually transitioned from thin, tall vessels to shorter jars. Within the Erligang culture, lei vessels were cast in the Central Plains and exported to the middle reaches of the Yangtze River.
