= Min fanglei =

Chinese bronze artifact (12th or 11th century BC)

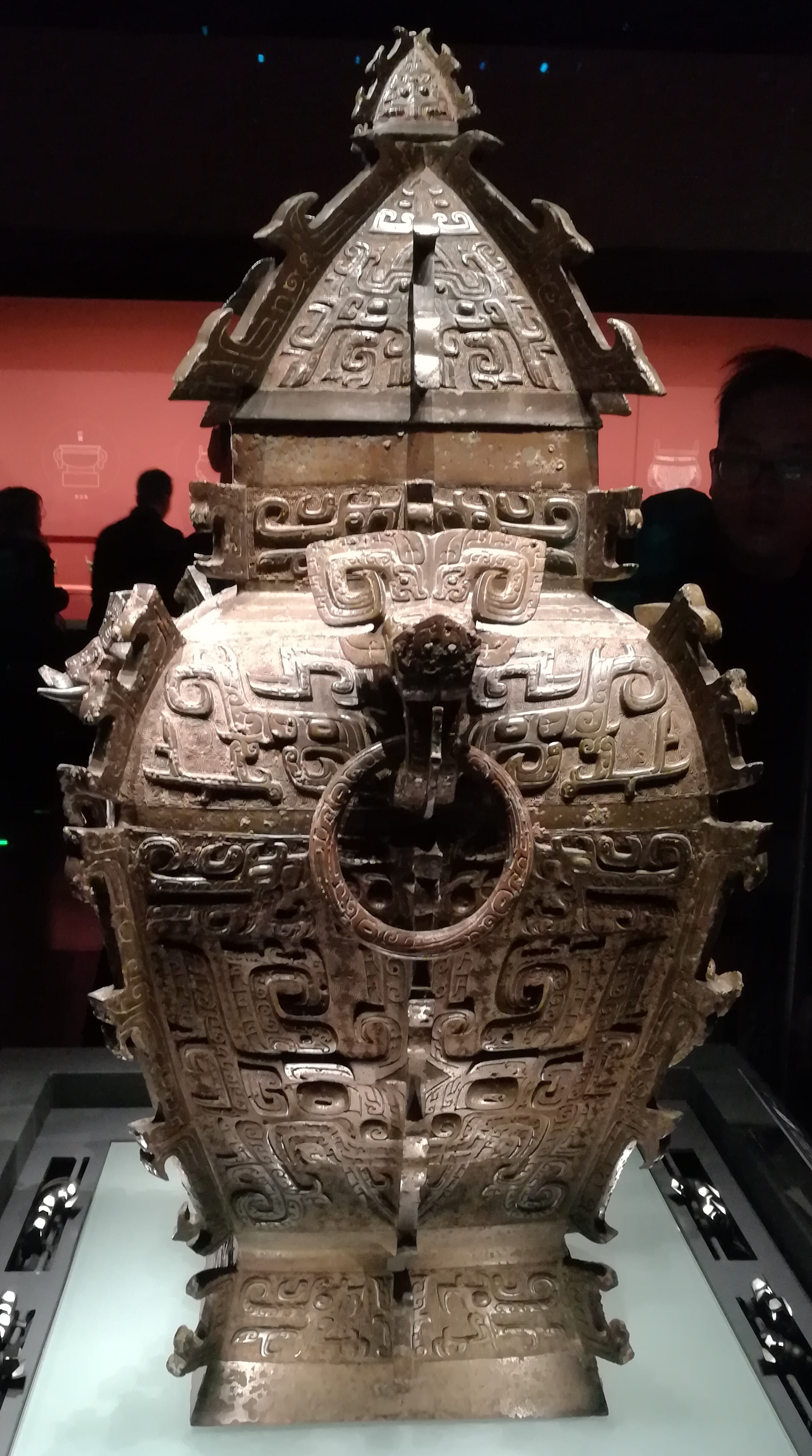
- Material: Bronze
- Height: 88 cm
- Created: c. 1100 BC
- Discovered: 1919; Hunan, China
- Discovered by: Ai Qingyan
- Present location: Changsha, Hunan, China

The Min fanglei (Chinese: 皿方罍; pinyin: Mǐn fāngléi) is an ancient Chinese bronze lei vessel from the late Shang dynasty or early Western Zhou dynasty (12th – 11th century BC). It is one of the largest of its kind, and called the "King of Fanglei". After its accidental discovery in 1919 in Hunan, its lid remained in China but the body was sold to collectors overseas, and set a world-record auction price for an Asian art work in 2001 when it fetched US$9.24 million. In 2014, a group of Chinese collectors bought it for a price between US$20 and 30 million, and donated it to the Hunan Museum, where it was reunited with its lid.

== Description ==
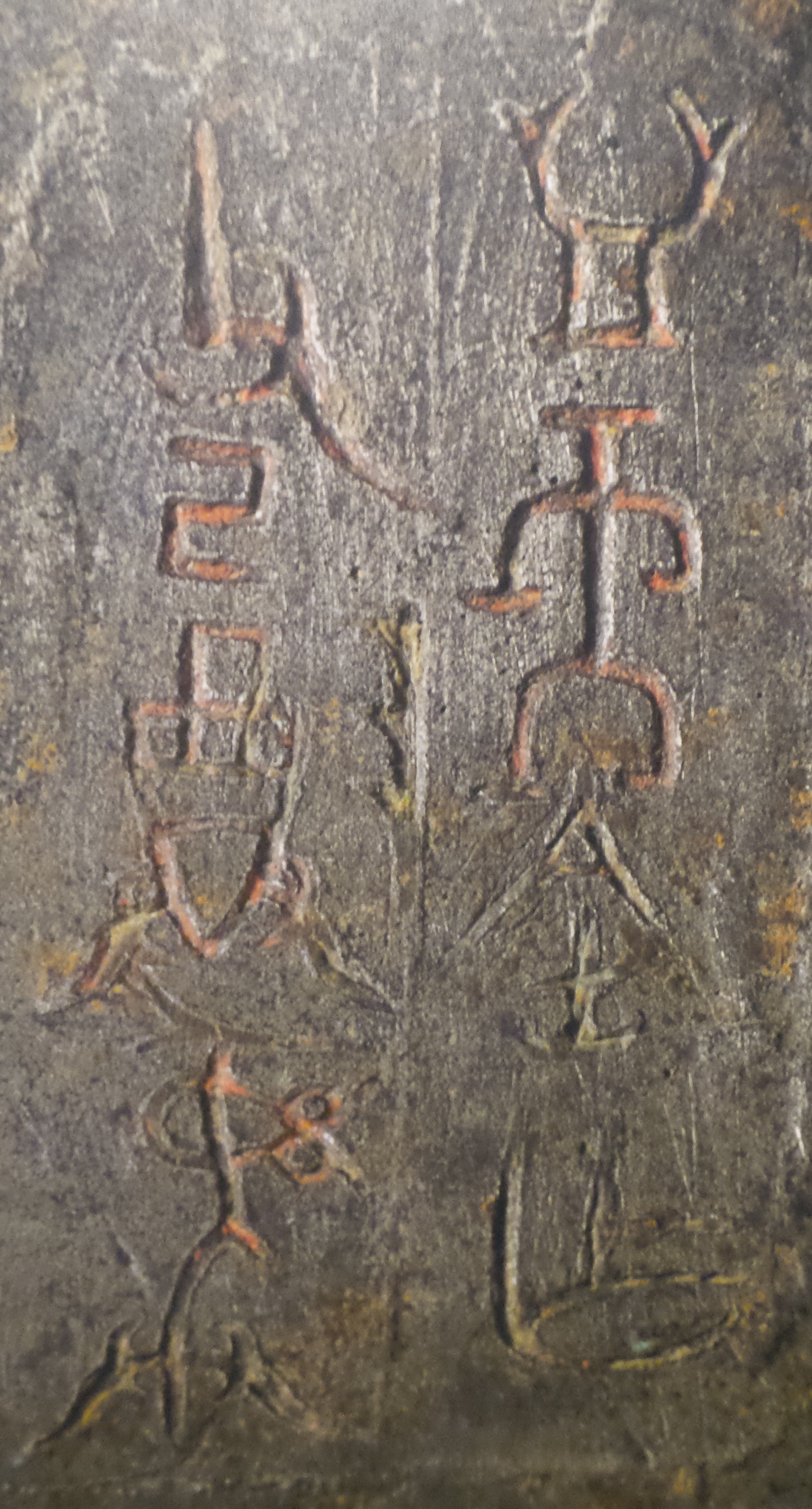
The inscription inside the lid reads: 皿而 [or 天] 全作父己尊彝 (Min Er [or Tian] Quan made [this] esteemed vessel for Father Ji).

The Min fanglei is dated to the late Shang dynasty or early Western Zhou dynasty (12th – 11th century BC). It is a fanglei, or square or rectangular lei, a type of ancient Chinese ritual bronze vessel. The Min fanglei is 88 cm (35 in) tall, and its mouth measures 26.1 cm × 21.6 cm (10.3 in × 8.5 in). Without the lid, it is 64 cm (25 inches) tall and weighs 42 kg (92.5 pounds). It is finely decorated on each of its four sides, with pairs of dragons cast on its shoulders and a horned dragon mask on its handle. Because of its size and workmanship, it is called the "King of Fanglei".

The fanglei is named for the bronze inscription inside its body, which reads "Min zuo Fu Ji zun yi" (Chinese: 皿作父己尊彝), or "Min made [this] esteemed vessel for Father Ji". On the inside of its lid, a repeat of the inscription has two extra characters, the first of which being ambiguous, naming the vessel's maker as "Min Er [or Tian] Quan" (皿而[or 天]全).

== Modern history ==
The Min fanglei was accidentally discovered in 1919 in Maoshanyu, Shuitian Township (now Jiaqiao Town), Taoyuan County, Hunan Province. According to local records, a boy named Ai Xinzhai (艾心斋) found the vessel lying partly exposed on a mountain slope and told his father Ai Qingyan (艾清宴), who then dug it out.

In 1924, Shi Yuzhang (石瑜璋) bought the body of the vessel for a substantial sum. Ai Qingyan kept the lid, which he gave to his son's school, Xinmin School (新民学校), in lieu of tuition. The staff of the school read the inscription inside the lid and recognized its significance. After the Ta Kung Pao in Changsha reported the discovery of the artifact on June 11, 1925, Zhang Shizhao, the provincial education director, attempted to retrieve the vessel but was unable to locate it.

Zhou Pan (周磐), a local military officer, purchased the lid for 3,000 silver dollars. When Zhou was arrested in Kunming, Yunnan in 1950, the lid was confiscated and given to the Hunan Cultural Relics Management Committee, which was merged into Hunan Museum in 1956.

In 1928, French scholar George Soulié de Morant published A History of Chinese Art, which included a photograph of the Min fanglei (without the lid) and noted that it had been collected by prominent art dealers including C. T. Loo, A. W. Bahr, and C. F. Yau (姚叔来).

The vessel was bought by Japanese collector Umekichi Asano (浅野梅吉) in 1930, and then sold to Taiwanese-Japanese collector Munachi Nita (新田栋一; Chinese name Peng Kaidong 彭楷棟) in 1950. When Nita put it on auction with Christie's in 2001, Shanghai Museum and Poly Museum raised a large sum to make a bid for the vessel, but were outbid by a French collector for US$9.24 million. At the time it was a world-record price for an Asian artwork.

In 2014, the Min fanglei was again put on auction by Christie's. On March 19, a day before the auction was scheduled to take place, Christie's announced that the owner had agreed to sell the vessel to a group of private Chinese collectors, who then donated it to Hunan Museum to be reunited with its lid, from which it had been separated for 90 years. Christie's did not disclose the sale price, but Sina News reported it to be US$20 million, while another estimate gave $30 million.

On January 14, 2018, the Min fanglei was featured on the Chinese TV program National Treasure.

== Gallery ==
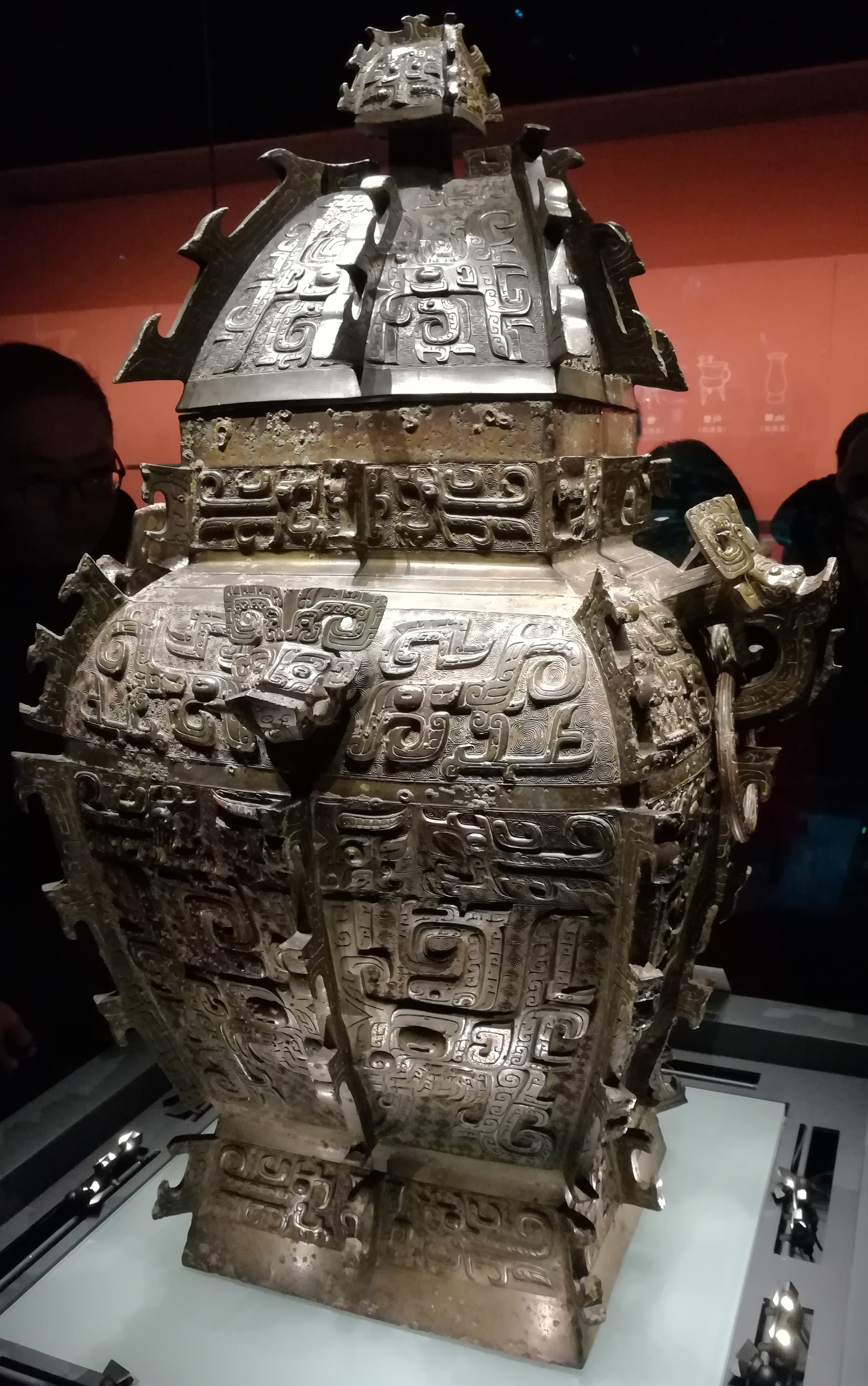

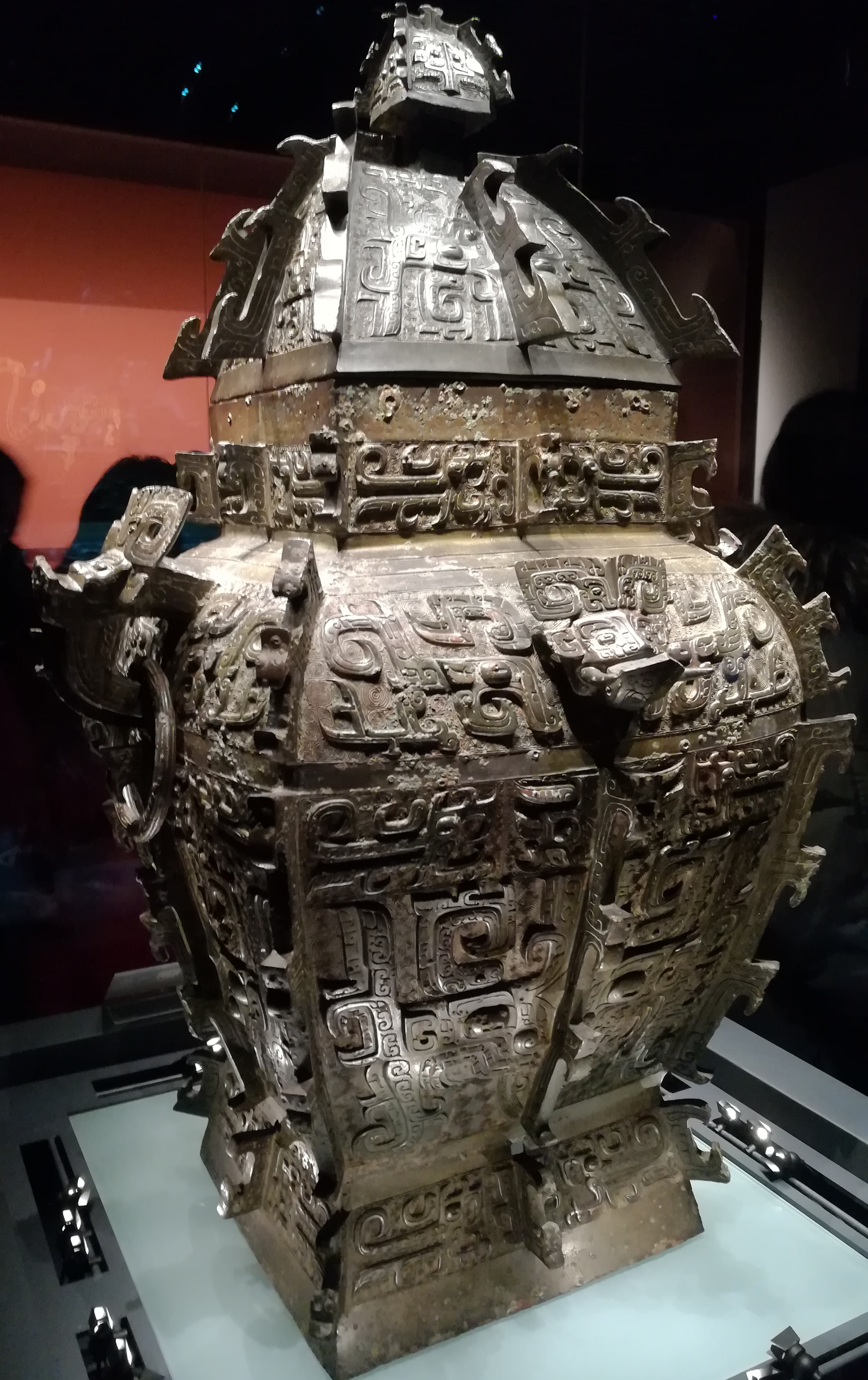

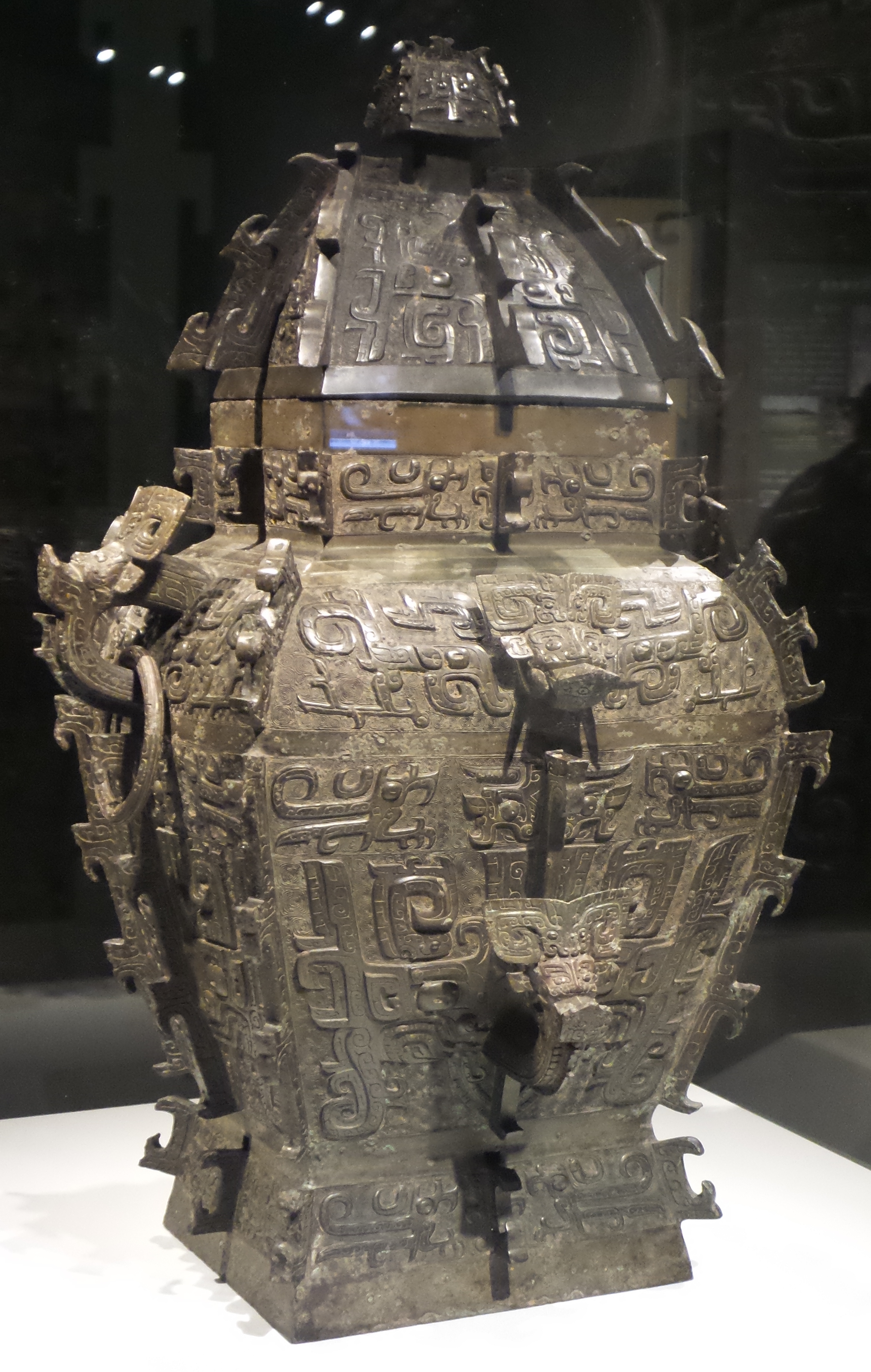

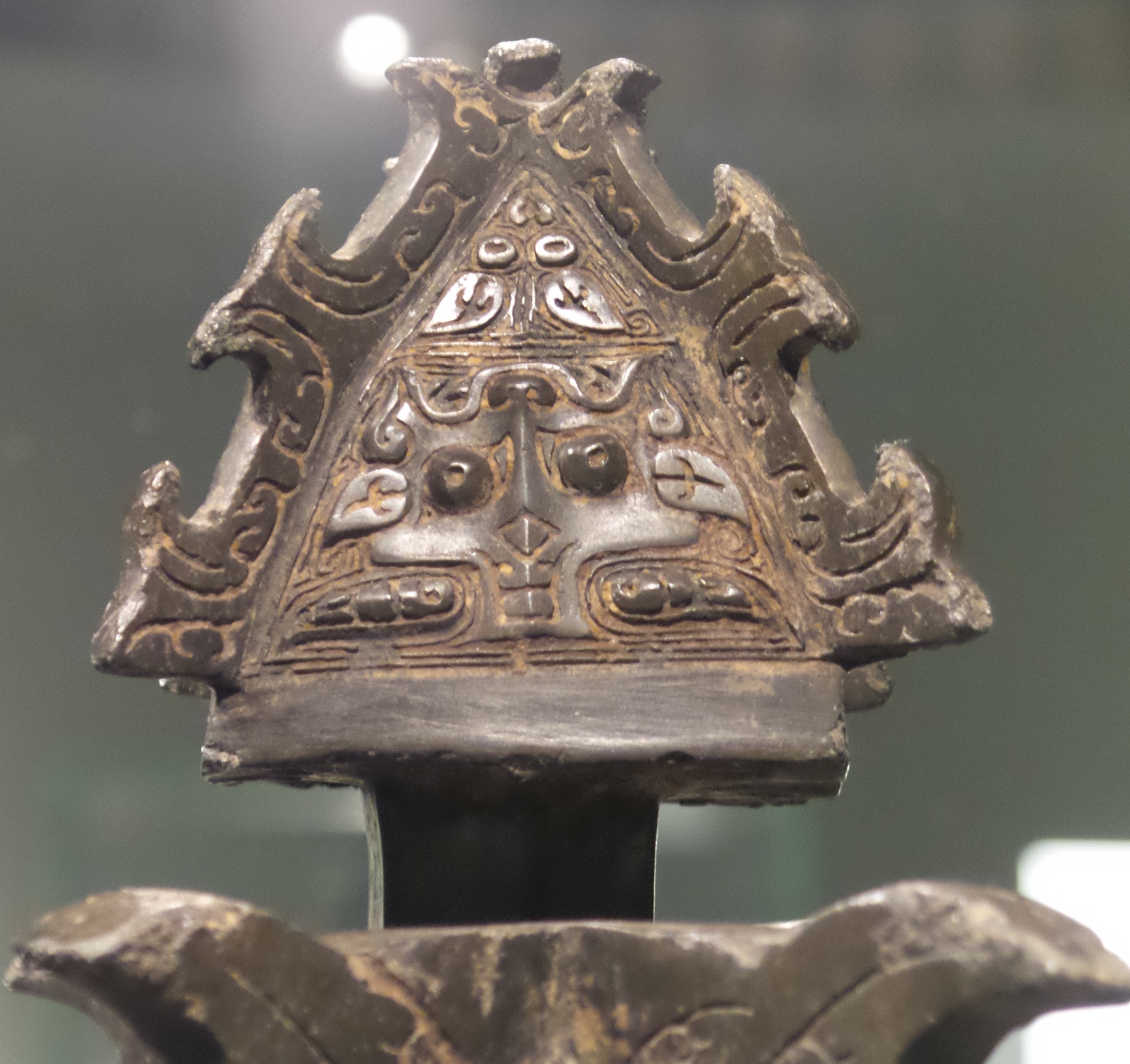
Tip of the lid
