= Zhang Zhaoda =

Chen dynasty general (517–571)

- 章昭達

Minister of Works (司空)
- In office 569–571
- Monarch: Emperor Xuan of Chen

Personal details
- Born: 517 Huzhou, Zhejiang
- Died: 19 January 571
- Children: Zhang Dabao; Zhang Qiao
- Parent: Zhang Fashang (father)
- Courtesy name: Botong (伯通)
- Peerage: Duke of Shaoling Commandery (邵陵郡公)

Zhang Zhaoda (517–19 January 571), courtesy name Botong, was a military general of the Liang and Chen during the Northern and Southern dynasties period. During the Hou Jing Disturbance, he raised troops in support of the Liang and became a prominent general through his association with the future Emperor Wen of Chen. Following the establishment of the Chen dynasty, he led several successful campaigns to pacify and consolidate the empire's territory in the southeast and far south, defeating the warlords Zhou Di, Chen Baoying and Ouyang He. He also led the first northern expedition of the Taijian era under Emperor Xuan of Chen, though the campaign yielded minimal success and he soon died of illness.

== Early life and background ==
Zhang Zhaoda was born into a family of officials from Wukang County (武康縣), Wuxing Commandery (吳興郡; in present-day Huzhou, Zhejiang). His grandfather, Zhang Daogai (章道蓋) was the administrator of Guangping during the Southern Qi dynasty, while his father, Zhang Fashang (章法尚) was an official in Yang province under the Liang. During the Datong era (535–546), Zhang Zhaoda served as a Palace Attendant to the Crown Prince, Xiao Gang. In 549, when the general, Hou Jing rebelled and laid siege to the capital, Jiankang, he rallied his fellow villagers to rescue the city. After the fall of the capital later that year, he returned to his hometown.

Zhang Zhaoda was blind in one eye. According to his biography in the Book of Chen, he once met a fortune teller when he was young who told him, "Your appearance is excellent, but you must go through a minor ordeal before you can attain wealth and status." While serving under Xiao Gang, he fell from his horse while drunk and suffered a minor injury to his temple. Zhang, believing he had fulfilled the prophecy, was delighted at first, but the fortune teller told him no. While fighting against Hou Jing at Jiankang, one of his eyes was shot by a stray arrow. Afterwards, he saw the fortune teller again, who said, "Your appearance is perfect; you will soon achieve high status."

== Service under Chen Baxian ==
Back in his hometown, Zhang Zhaoda met and became friends with Chen Qian, the nephew of the Liang general, Chen Baxian. He joined Chen Qian in his travels, and the two's relationship was described to be that of a ruler and subject. After Hou Jing's defeat in 552, Chen Qian was appointed Administrator of Wuxing, so Zhang personally visited him with a whip to pay his respects. Chen was pleased to see Zhang and appointed him as a general in his staff, where he received great favour from Chen that surpassed his other peers.

In 555, while Chen Baxian plotted his coup against his fellow regent, Wang Sengbian, he ordered Chen Qian to raise troops at Changcheng (長城; in present-day Changxing County, Zhejiang) and prepare to defend against the Administrator of Wuxing, Du Kan. Chen sent Zhang to his uncle's base at Jingkou several times to receive his plans. After Wang was killed in the coup, Du Kan dispatched his general, Du Tai to attack Changcheng. Chen Qian resisted him and instructed Zhang to oversee military affairs within their city. When Du Kan retreated, Zhang followed Chen eastward and camped at Wuxing to carry out their counterattack against Du. Following Du's defeat in 556, Zhang accompanied Chen again, this time westward to attack Zhang Biao at Kuaiji, who they captured. For his achievements in the campaign, Zhang Zhaoda was appointed General Who Illuminates Light and Inspector of Ding province.

In 557, Chen Baxian usurped the throne and established the Chen dynasty, becoming posthumously known as Emperor Wu of Chen. At the time, the Inspector of Jin province, Liu Yi was garrisoned at Dongyang, and though he submitted to Emperor Wu's authority, his submission was nominal and he constantly overstepped his authority by privately appointing his own officials. Emperor Wu was worried about his behaviour, so he entrusted Zhang Zhaoda to keep him in check by appointing him as Magistrate of Changshan County in the heart of Liu Yi's territory. In 558, Zhang was appointed Magistrate of Wukang.

== Service under Emperor Wen ==
=== Campaign against Wang Lin ===
In 559, Emperor Wu died and was succeeded by Chen Qian, who became posthumously known as Emperor Wen of Chen. Zhang served as his Outer Personnel Cavalier Regular Attendant, and in 560, Emperor Wen enfeoffed him the Marquis of Xinle County for his deeds at Changcheng five years ago.

Later in 560, Zhang Zhaoda, along with Hou Andu and others, were ordered to follow Hou Tian in resisting the Hunan warlord, Wang Lin at Zhakou (柵口; southwest of present-day Wuwei, Anhui). Zhang played an important role in the ensuing battle of Wuhu, as he led the vanguard on a large warship to the middle of the Yangzi river where he launched boulders at the enemy ships. His assault allowed the Chen forces to pull off their fire attack on Wang Lin's navy, and when Wang was defeated, Zhang was ascribed with the first merit.

=== Pacification of the southeast ===
In 561, Zhang Zhaoda was appointed Regular Mounted Attendant and Chief Controller of military affairs of the four provinces of Ying, Ba, Wu and Yuan, General of Martial Wisdom, and Inspector of Ying province. He was soon promoted to General Who Pacifies the West.

In 562, the Inspector of Heng province, Zhou Di rebelled against the Chen in Linchuan, allying with Liu Yi and the Inspector of Min province, Chen Baoying. The Chen court commissioned Zhang Zhaoda to lead his troops through a shortcut and suppress the rebellion. Zhang defeated Zhou, and he was appointed General Who Protects the Army and enfeoffed the Marquis of Shaowu County while his previous offices remained the same.

In 563, Chen Baoying received Zhou Di, and together they invaded Linchuan, so the court assigned Zhang Zhaoda as Chief Controller to suppress them. Zhou Di retreated when Zhang arrived at Dongxing Ridge (東興嶺; in present-day Lichuan County, Jiangxi), and after crossing the ridge, Zhang camped at Jian'an (建安; in present-day Jian'ou, Fujian) to attack Chen Baoying. Occupying the border area between the commanderies of Jian'an and Jin'an, Chen built palisades on land and water to defend himself against the Chen attacks. Zhang suffered an early setback in battle, so he occupied the upper reaches of the river. There, he ordered his soldiers to cut down trees with the branches and leaves still attached to make rafts, tying them together with long ropes and setting up camp on both sides of the river.

In 564, Chen Baoying repeatedly attempted to entice Zhang Zhaoda to attack him, but Zhang remained unmoved. Soon enough, a rainstorm arrived and caused the river to rise significantly. Zhang then employed the rafts he built to ram against Chen's water palisades and broke through his defences. He sent his soldiers to attack Chen's infantry, and just as the battle was about to begin, Emperor Wen sent Yu Xiaoqing to lead the forces of Kuaiji, Dongyang, Linhai, and Yongjia by sea to link up with Zhang from the east. Zhang and Yu launched a joint attack, and Chen was defeated. The Fujian region was pacified, and Zhou Di, Liu Yi and Chen Baoying were all captured alive. As a reward, Zhang Zhaoda was appointed General of the Front Garrison and Kaifu Yitong Sansi.

Emperor Wen once had a dream that Zhang Zhaoda was promoted to a high position in the imperial court, which he told Zhang about at dawn. Later, at a banquet, the emperor asked Zhang, "Do you remember that dream? How will you repay it?" to which he replied, "I shall serve you as a hound or steed, fulfilling my duty as a subject." Shortly thereafter, Zhang was appointed as General Who Guards the South, Chief Controller of military affairs of the provinces of Jiang, Ying and Wu, Inspector of Jiang province, Regular Attendant and Yitong.

== Service under Emperor Fei ==
In 566, Emperor Wen was succeeded by his son, Emperor Fei, and Zhang Zhaoda was promoted to Palace Attendant and General Who Attacks the South, as well as enfeoffed the Duke of Shaoling Commandery.

In 567, the Marquis of Chong'an County, Hua Jiao plotted to rebel as Emperor Fei came under the control of his uncle, Chen Xu. Hua falsely implicated Zhang in his letters and proclamations and sent several envoys to Zhang persuading him to join the rebellion. However, Zhang had these envoys arrested and sent to the capital. After Hua Jiao's rebellion was quelled, Zhang was promoted to Grand General Who Attacks the South. After completing his tenure, he was summoned to serve as Grand General Who Pacifies the Centre while retaining most of his previous positions.

== Service under Emperor Xuan ==
=== Suppressing Ouyang He ===
In 569, Chen Xu had Emperor Fei abdicate the throne for him and became posthumously known as Emperor Xuan. Initially, Zhang Zhaoda was promoted to Grand General of Chariots and Cavalry, but because he failed to return to the capital in time, the court officials impeached him and demoted him to just General of Chariots and Cavalry.

Later that year, the Inspector of Guang province, Ouyang He rebelled and occupied Lingnan. In response, the court commissioned Zhang Zhaoda to crush the rebellion, and he quickly marched with his army to Shixing. He was welcomed by Lady Xian, who rallied the local soldiers and chieftains to aid in his campaign. Ouyang He panicked and camped at Kuangkou (洭口; in present-day Yingde, Guangdong), where he gathered a large amount of sand and stones, filled bamboo cages and placed them outside the sluice gates to obstruct the Chen army's advance. Zhang Zhaoda positioned himself upstream, installing spikes on the bows of his ships and constructing rams to break the enemy barricades. He also ordered his soldiers to sneak through underwater with swords to cut the bamboo cages, which were all eventually broken. Zhang then launched a surprise attack with his large warships downstream, dealing the rebels a great rout.

In 570, Zhang Zhaoda captured Ouyang He alive and sent him to the capital, thus pacifying Guang province. He was restored to Grand General of Chariots and Cavalry and transferred to the office of the Minister of Works while concurrently serving his previous positions.

=== First Northern Expedition of Taijian ===
That same year, Zhang Zhaoda attacked Xiao Kui of the Western Liang at his capital in Jiangling, which was supported by the Northern Zhou. He faced resistance from Xiao Kui and the Zhou general, Lu Teng. The Zhou army had built a fortified city on the south bank of the Xiling gorge called Anshu fort (安蜀城). To transport food supplies into the city, they had stretched a large rope across the river and wove it into a bridge. Zhang Zhaoda ordered his troops to make long halberds and placed them on the deck of his warships. They then used the halberds to cut the bridge from above, thus severing the enemy supply lines. Zhang carried out an assault on Anshu, and the defenders surrendered.

As Zhaoda attacked Jiangling, however, he encountered stiff resistance from the Liang and Zhou forces. He breached the Ningshuo dyke (寧朔堤) at Longchuan (龍川; in present-day Jiangling, Hubei) and flooded the city, but after Lu Teng came out from the west to fight, he suffered a defeat and was forced to withdraw. Along the way, Zhang attacked Qingni (青泥; in present-day Tianmen, Hubei), defeating the Liang general, Xu Shiwu (許世武) who was sent to reinforce the area. At the time, the Liang and Zhou had amassed a large number of ships in Qingni, so Zhang sent his subordinates Qian Daoji and Cheng Wenji on small boats to burn them.

=== Death and posthumous honours ===
On 19 January 571, Zhang Zhaoda died of illness at the age of 54. He was posthumously appointed Grand General and rewarded with twenty swordsmen as his guards. His fief was also increased by 500 households as his eldest son, Zhang Dabao inherited his titles. In 572, Zhang was enshrined in the ancestral temple of Emperor Wen.

== Character ==
The Book of Chen describes Zhang Zhaoda as strict and demanding. Whenever he was assigned to lead a campaign, he would order his troops to march day and night. However, whenever he won a battle, he would always attribute credit to his generals or commanders first. He was also well-respected among his soldiers, as he would share his food and drinks with them. At banquets, he arranged for female performers to play various kinds of music, most prominently the music of the Qiang and Hu people of the north and west. The music and presentation of the performers were said to be the best of the time, and they performed even when Zhang's forces were engaged in battle.

== Sources ==
- Book of Chen
- History of the Southern Dynasties
- Zizhi Tongjian
