= Zhou She =

Zhou She (周捨) (469–524), courtesy name Shengyi (昇逸), formally Viscount Jian (簡子, literally "the undiscriminating viscount"), was an official of the Chinese Liang Dynasty. He was never titular prime minister, and never held an office of high rank, but was largely considered a de facto prime minister and was well regarded by his contemporaries.

Zhou She was an eighth-generation descendant of the famed Jin official Zhou Yi (周顗). His father Zhou Yong (周顒) was a Southern Qi official. When Zhou She was young, he became known for his skills in rhetoric, and he was retained by Wang Liang (王亮), then the mayor of the capital Jiankang, to serve as his secretary.

When Emperor Wu of Liang seized the throne from Emperor He of Southern Qi in 502, he sought out people with talent to serve in his administration. His prime minister Fan Yun was friendly with Zhou She's father Zhou Yong, and he recommended Zhou She, whom Emperor Wu made a low-level official and gradually promoted. In 503, Fan died, and Emperor Wu entrusted the important matters of state to Zhou She and Xu Mian, effectively making them co-prime ministers, even though neither carried the title and neither received particularly high rank. For the next 20 years, Zhou and Xu served together in this key capacity. Zhou was considered capable and honest and particularly frugal in his living.

In 524, a letter was from Bai Wo (白渦), a commandery governor, was uncovered, in which Bai promised Zhou a large bribe. While there was no evidence showing that Zhou actually received the letter or acted on Bai's behalf, Emperor Wu relieved Zhou from his post. Zhou died later that year, and Emperor Wu, regretting relieving Zhou of his post, issued two edicts greatly praising Zhou for his service and personally attended his wake. He also gave Zhou the posthumous name of Viscount Jian—although there was no record in history indicating that Emperor Wu ever created Zhou a viscount while he was alive or posthumously.
