= Book of Qi =

Liang Dynasty history book about Southern Qi dynasty

- Traditional Chinese: 齊書
- Simplified Chinese: 齐书
Transcriptions
Standard Mandarin
- Hanyu Pinyin: Qí Shū
Yue: Cantonese
- Jyutping: Cai4 Syu1
Southern Min
- Hokkien POJ: Chê-su

Alternative Chinese name
- Traditional Chinese: 南齊書
- Simplified Chinese: 南齐书
Transcriptions
Standard Mandarin
- Hanyu Pinyin: Nán Qí Shū
Yue: Cantonese
- Jyutping: Naam4 Cai4 Syu1

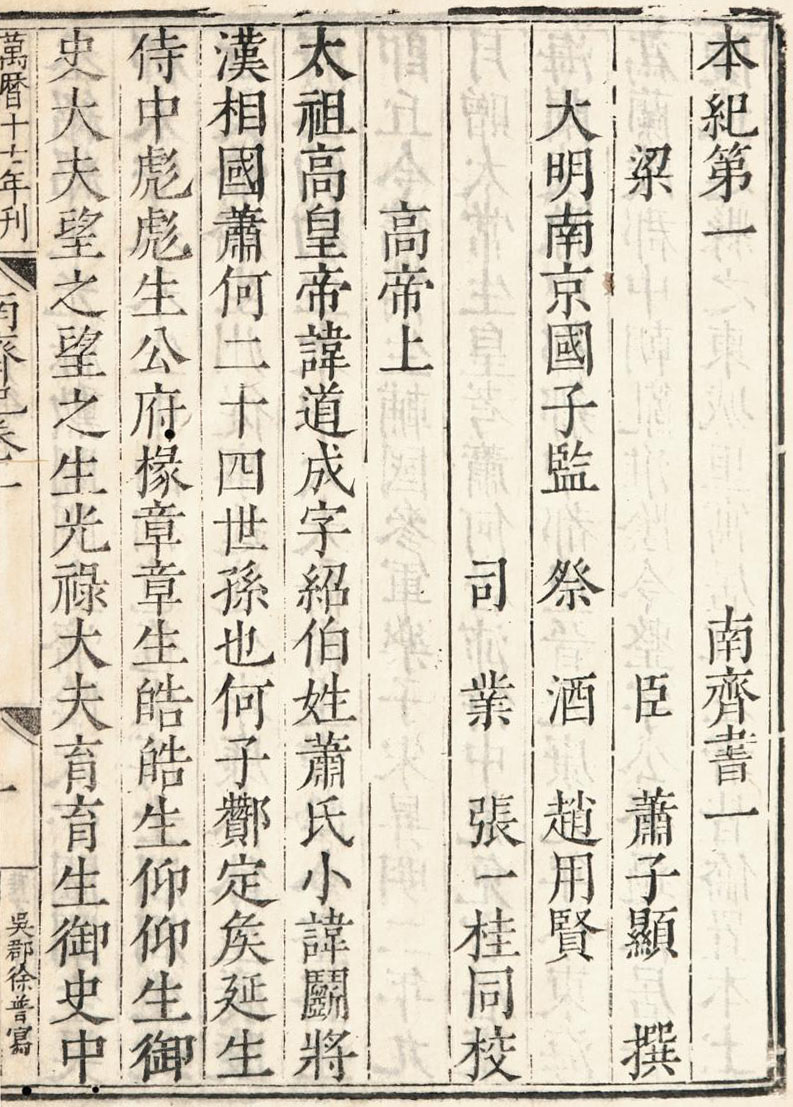
A page from a Ming Dynasty edition of the Book of Qi

The Book of Qi (Qí Shū) or Book of Southern Qi (Nán Qí Shū) is a history of the Chinese dynasty Southern Qi covering the period from 479 to 502, and is one of the Twenty-Four Histories of Chinese history. It was written by Xiao Zixian during the succeeding Liang Dynasty. This book was the only one of the Twenty-Four Histories to be authored by a member of the chronicled dynasty's ruling house – Xiao Zixian was a grandson of Emperor Gao, founder of Southern Qi,

When first submitted to Emperor Wu of Liang, the book was known simply as the Book of Qi. After the Book of Northern Qi (the history of the later Northern Qi dynasty) was written, this book became known as the Book of Southern Qi so that the two could be distinguished. The book contained 60 volumes when written, but one preface was later lost.

== Content ==
The format of the text is similar to previous standard histories, with volumes that include annals, treatises, and biographies. Volumes 1 to 8 are annals covering the emperors of the dynasty starting with Emperor Gao in volumes 1 and 2. Some short lived rulers that were not given the posthumous title of emperor are covered, including Volume 4 Prince of Yulin, Volume 5 Prince of Hailing, and Volume 7 Marquess of Donghun. Volumes 9 to 19 are treatises covering rituals in volumes 9 and 10, music in volume 11, astronomy in volumes 12 and 13, administrative districts in 14 and 15, official posts in volume 16, carriages and dress in volume 17, auspicious signs in volume 18, and the five elements in volume 19.

Volumes 20 to 59 are biographies beginning with Volume 20 Biographies of Empresses and Consorts. Xiao Zixian devotes Volume 22 Prince Wenxian of Yuzhang 豫章文獻王 to his father, also known by his personal name Xiao Ni. Volume 52 Biographies of Men of Letters includes an analysis of literary style. Xiao Zixian was a well known poet and his description in this volume is considered a valuable source of historic literary criticism. Xiao Zixian was open about his Buddhist background. In Volume 54 he described a debate between Taoist Gu Huan 顧歡 (c. 425–488) and Buddhist Yuan Can 袁粲 (420–477). Xiao Zixian favored the Buddhist side of the debate.

== Translations ==
Tian contains a partial translation of Volume 52 'Biographies of Men of Letters'.
