= Shitong =

Tang-era treatise on Chinese historiography

A page from a Ming dynasty printed edition of Shitong

Pages from a copy of Shitong located in the Shanghai Library

The Shitong (Chinese: 史通; pinyin: Shǐtōng; lit. "Generality of Historiography" or "All about Historiography"), also translated into English as A Thorough Exploration in Historiography, is one of the first Chinese-language works specifically about the theories of history and a detailed examination of historiography. It is deemed to be "the first comprehensive work on historical criticism in any language." The text was compiled by Liu Zhiji (Note: Liu's biographies in both Books of Tang refer to him by his courtesy name "Zixuan" (子玄); the New Book of Tang recorded that Liu went by his courtesy name while he was alive as his name violated the naming taboo of Emperor Xuanzong of Tang, whose name was Li Longji.) between 708 and 710 during the Tang dynasty. The book discusses the general pattern of the past official dynastic historiography on structure, method, order of arrangement, sequence, caption and commentary back to the pre-Qin era.

Shitong is divided into 39 inner chapters and 13 outer chapters. Three of the inner chapters had been lost since the times of Ouyang Xiu, (Note: Hence, the New Book of Tang recorded that Shitong only had 49 chapters.) while the rest managed to survive. The inner chapters, the principal part of the book, provided information on the types, forms, rules, layout, the collecting of historical materials, outline, and the principle of historiography. The outer chapters describe the official system of the historiographer, origin and development of histories, and the success and failure of past historians.

The printed copies from the Song dynasty are no longer available, while the printed editions of the Ming dynasty are. The oldest are the 1535 edition by Lu Shen, and the most complete version is the 1577 edition by Zhang Zhixiang, which was published by Zhonghua Shuju in 1961.

In comparison with other contemporary Chinese works, the Shitong has several notable innovations in ideas and content, including:

- The Shitong rejected the idea of fatalism and stated that the successes or failures of dynasties were not determined by heaven's decree, but by the dynasties’ character and quality.
- The Shitong rejected the idea of using results as the only criteria to assess people.
- The Shitong rejected the idea of Sinocentrism and Han Chinese chauvinism and advocated a healthy skepticism about the established conceptions and ideas, which were not always correct or indisputable.

== See also ==
- Chinese historiography
