= Shen Zhong =

Sixth century Chinese philologist

沈重 Shěn Zhòng is a sixth-century Chinese philologist. In his commentary of the Book of Songs he was the first scholar to note that the poems did not rhyme in contemporary pronunciation. He suggested pronouncing words differently in order to make the rhymes work. This practice is referred to as xíe yùn.
