= Jiang Yan (poet) =

Chinese poet and politician

- Born: 444; Kaocheng
- Died: 505
- Occupation: Poet
- Writing career
- Period: Liu Song dynasty Southern Qi; Liang dynasty

Jiang Yan (Chinese: 江淹; 444 – 505), courtesy name Wentong (文通), was a poet and fu writer during the Northern and Southern dynasties known for his imitation poetry, a prominent genre of the Six Dynasties era.

Jiang Yan stated that he loved the strange and different, and therefore sought new social trends and literary habits. This affected his friendships and writing style.

There was a legend saying that Jiang once dreamt of returning his magic brush to Guo Pu and lost his writing talent ever since. The idiom "江郎才盡" is therefore used for describing the situation when a creator is experiencing writer's block after using up all his/her talent.

== See also ==
- Six Dynasties poetry
