= Qu Yi (actor) =

Chinese musical actor (born 1992)

- 瞿艺
- Born: November 9, 1992 (age 33); Huaihua, Hunan, China
- Education: Shenyang Conservatory of Music
- Occupation: Actor

Qu Yi (simplified Chinese: 瞿艺; traditional Chinese: 瞿藝; pinyin: Qú Yì; born 9 November 1992) is a Chinese musical actor.

== Biography ==
Qu Yi was born in Huaihua, Hunan Province in 1992. He graduated from the Performing Arts Department of Shenyang Conservatory of Music. Influenced by his family, he studied opera, folk dance, Latin dance, hosting, performance and piano when he was young, and then received professional vocal training.

His musical works include: the Chinese version of musical Journey Under the Midnight Sun (adapted from a Japanese mystery novel『白夜行』written by Keigo Higashino, cooperated with Han Xue and Liu Lingfei), the Chinese version of musical Rimbaud, musical Non-stop Sorrow adapted from Jerry Huang's song (the same name), the Chinese version of musical Rock of Ages (cooperated with Zheng Yunlong), the Chinese version of musical Vincent Van Gogh directed by Hong Kong stage director Desmond Wai-Kit Tang (鄧偉傑), musical Secret adapted from Jay Chou's movie (the same name), original musical Law Poem - Lei Jingtian which is a rare law topic musical in China, domestic original musical Love Because Of Taste, little theater musical Music Cooking Show, campus musical Exchange Students and musical Hidden Addict.

== Musical work ==
Production	Production in Chinese	Role	Location	Time & Round
Journey Under the Midnight Sun	《白夜行》(Chinese and Japanese)	Kazunari Shinozuka (Chinese: 筱冢一成 Japanese:篠塚一成)	National Tour	Mar 29th 2019 - Jul 14th 2019
Rimbaud	《兰波》	Rimbaud	Shanghai Grand Theatre	Dec 5th 2018 - Dec 9th 2018
Rimbaud	《兰波》	Rimbaud	Beijing Longfu Theatre	Aug 22nd 2018 - Sept 1st 2019
Non-stop Sorrow	《马不停蹄的忧伤》	Jiang Dayu	Shanghai Grand Theatre	Sept 5th 2018 - Sept 14th 2018
Rock of Ages	《摇滚年代》中文版)	Drew	Shenzhen Nanshan Culture and Sports Center Theatre	Jun 1st 2018 - Jun 2nd 2018
Rock of Ages	《摇滚年代》中文版)	Drew	Guangdong Arts Theatre	Jun 7th 2018 - Jun 8th 2018
Rock of Ages	《摇滚年代》中文版)	Drew	Beijing Century Theatre	Jun 14th 2018 - Jun 17th 2018
Vincent Van Gogh	《梵高》	Theo van Gogh/ Van Gogh's Father/ Anton Mauve / Paul Gauguin	Shanghai ET Theatre	Sept 30th 2017-Oct 8th 2017 (Round One)
Vincent Van Gogh	《梵高》	Theo van Gogh/ Van Gogh's Father/ Anton Mauve / Paul Gauguin	Shanghai Grand Theatre	Dec 8th 2017 - Dec 17th 2017 (Round Two)
Secret	《不能说的秘密》	Yuhao (Piano Prince)	National Tour	2017 (39 Rounds)
Law Poem - Lei Jingtian	《律诗－雷经天》	Wang Yifan/ Li Xingguo	Shanghai ET Theatre	May 19, 2016 - May 22, 2016
Law Poem - Lei Jingtian	《律诗－雷经天》	Wang Yifan/ Li Xingguo	Shanghai Culture Square	Mar 18th 2017 - Mar 19th 2017
Exchange Students	《交换生》	Simon	Shanghai Culture Square	Aug 9th 2016 - Aug 15th 2016
Love Because Of Taste" & “Music Cooking Show	《因味爱，所以爱》&《音乐厨男秀》	Liu Yan	Shanghai Musical Theme Restaurant	2016 -2017 (150 Rounds)
Hidden Addict	《瘾藏者》	Group Dancer	People's Great Stage in Shanghai	Jun 24th 2016 - Jun 26th 2016

== Discography ==
- Song Miserable Love (Chinese Title:《千刀万剐的爱》), episode of Musical Vincent Van Gogh, cooperated with musical actor Mao Haifei, 2017
- Song To.Vincent van Gogh, episode of Musical Vincent Van Gogh, 2017
- Song Draw a Real Life (Chinese Title:《画出写实人生》), episode of Musical Vincent Van Gogh, cooperated with musical actor Mao Haifei, 2017
- Song Moonlight (Chinese Title:《皓月》), episode of Musical Rimbaud, adapted from Paul Verlaine's poem(the same name), cooperated with musical actor Sun Douer, 2019

== Radio and TV program ==
- Shanghai Traffic Station FM 105.7, Flying Arts ( Chinese Title:《艺点欣飞扬》), Sept 30th 2016, Sing Today, Happy in Arts (Chinese Title: 《今天来唱歌，快乐在艺起》)
- Shanghai Traffic Station FM 105.7, Flying Arts ( Chinese Title:《艺点欣飞扬》), Sept 20th 2017, Wonderful Music - Van Gogh is Coming (Chinese Title: 《音乐美好，梵高来了》)
- National Treasure (Chinese: 国家宝藏), a Chinese cultural exploration reality TV program that aired on China Central Television, Season One, Jan 28th 2018, Chapter Jade Cong (玉琮), played a role as clansman of Liangchu Tribe, cooperated with Zhou Dongyu
- Central People's Broadcasting Station FM106.6, Art Talk (Chinese Title:《文艺大家谈》), Aug 17th 2019
