= Ren Zhong =

Chinese artist (born 1976)

Ren Zhong (Chinese: 任重; pinyin: Rèn Zhòng; born 1976) is a Chinese calligrapher, painter, and art collector known for his gongbi paintings and calligraphy. His artworks have been exhibited in the National Art Museum of China, Sun Yat-sen Memorial Hall, Yunnan Provincial Museum, and Rong Bao Zhai.

== Biography ==
Ren Zhong was born in Yinchuan, Ningxia Autonomous Region in 1976. While his father taught him traditional Chinese painting and poetry, Ren developed a strong interest in Song and Yuan dynasty paintings and literature. He started to practice painting and calligraphy since childhood and won the Golden Award at the National “Star Cup” Painting and Calligraphy Exhibition at the age of 16. In 1997, a selection of his works was exhibited at the First European Exhibition of Chinese Art and First International Exhibition of Fan Paintings and Calligraphies hosted by the Ministry of Culture of China. Since then, his works have been exhibited in major art museums and galleries around the country, including the National Art Museum of China, Sun Yat-Sen Memorial Hall, and Sichuan Museum. He is Chair of Yinchuan Artists Association, and a member of the Ningxia Artists Association. His presence on an international level includes being featured on Masterpiece London, Art Basel Hong Kong, and Casa Natale di Leonardo da Vinci.

== Influence and theme ==
Ren have been influenced by the Southern School of ink painting and modern ink painting master Chang Dai-chien, as well as traditional Chinese culture and Confucianism. He believes any ordinary activities of human life – including art practices - is a manifestation of the sacred. As he puts heavy emphasis on humanism and harmony among nature and society, both his creative process and the final works echo to this belief. “The investigation on traditional masterpieces and techniques, the observation of nature, and the devotion to traditional culture… few people can dedicate themselves to such hard work persistently”, foremost Chinese artist and scholar Chen Peiqiu commented, “therefore, Ren’s works have captured all aspects of Gongbi art comprehensively, from figures to landscape to animals, from the Song Dynasty to the modern era, he is such a well-rounded artist.”

== Auction ==
Ren Zhong's artworks have been offered at auction multiple times. In 2013, his ink and colour on silk Seven Sages achieved a realized price of 8.85 million Chinese yuan (approximately $1.25 million US dollars) at Sotheby's Beijing
