= Ahakp'yŏn =

Joseon-era Korean educational book

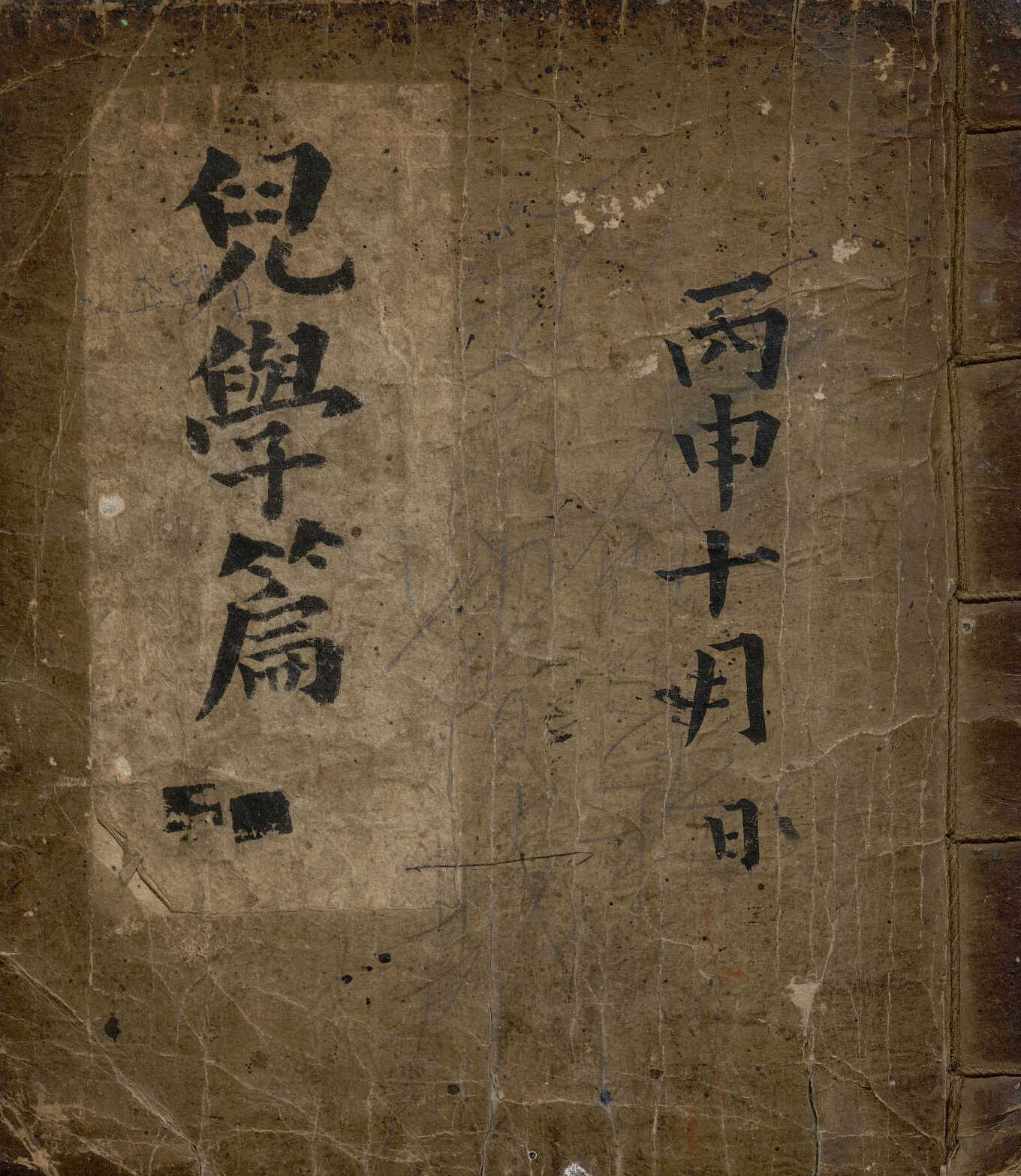
- Cover of a copy of the text
- Author: Chŏng Yagyong
- Language: Classical Chinese (Hanja)
- Genre: Educational
- Publication place: Joseon

Korean name
- Hangul: 아학편
- Hanja: 兒學編
- RR: Ahakpyeon
- MR: Ahakp'yŏn

Ahakp'yŏn (Korean: 아학편; Hanja: 兒學編) is a Joseon-era Korean educational book for learning Hanja (Chinese characters). The book was originally written by Chŏng Yagyong (1762–1836) possibly some time around 1810 and builds on the Chinese educational text Thousand Character Classic.

The text was reprinted and adapted a number of times afterwards. One notable edition was published in 1908 by Chi Sŏgyŏng; that edition covers the English, Chinese, Japanese, and Korean languages, with primary focus on English.

== Description ==
The book was created to address perceived flaws in how the Thousand Character Classic teaches Chinese characters. It takes some inspiration from the 1527 educational text Hunmong chahoe, which also covers the Thousand Character Classic. The text consists of two volumes. Each volume focuses on 1,000 Hanja characters, for a total of 2,000. The first volume covers largely nouns relating to the natural world. The second contains more abstract or intangible concepts, as well as terms like pronouns, adjectives, verbs.

== Chi Sŏgyŏng edition (1908) ==
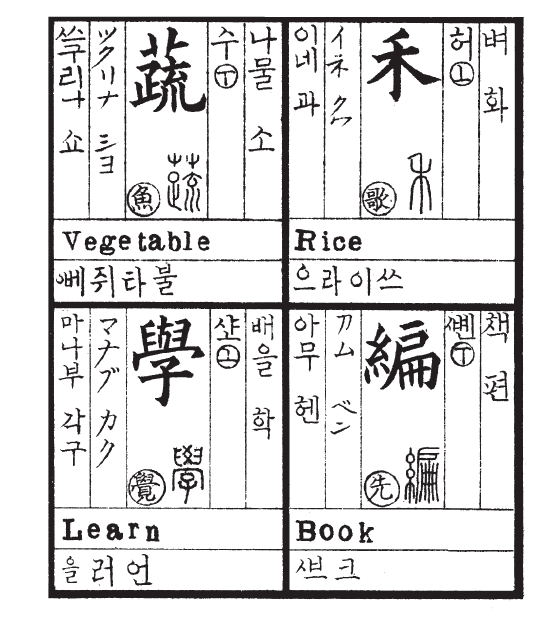
Four entries in the 1908 Ahakp'yŏn. Each entry contains (in order, from top right to top left, then to bottom to rows) native Korean and Sino-Korean readings in Hangul, Chinese reading in Hangul (with tone), Chinese character (with seal script and rhyme), Japanese kun'yomi and on'yomi in katakana, Japanese reading in Hangul, English in Latin script, then English in Hangul.

In 1908, scholar Chi Sŏgyŏng published a revised multilingual version of the text. The text covers 2003 Hanja characters in four languages: English, Chinese, Japanese (using Katakana), and Korean (using Hangul). It is mostly intended for educating people on the English language.

The text employs an unusual Hangul orthography that attempts to more closely represent the sounds of English. For example, it uses the unusual Hangul consonant cluster ᅋ to represent the 'f' sound in face: ᅋᅦ이쓰. Another example is the use of ᅈ to represent the 'th' sound in nothing: 너ᅈᅵᆼ.

This edition, particularly for its unusual orthography for English, drew some interest on social media beginning around 2018. It was featured on a November 17, 2018 episode of the television program Heavenly Collection.
