= Pingshui Yun =

Historical rhyming system for Middle Chinese

The Pingshui Rhyming Scheme (Chinese: 平水韻; pinyin: Píngshǔi Yùn; lit. 'Level Water Rhyme') is a rhyming system of the Middle Chinese language. Compiled in the Jin dynasty, Pingshui Yun is one of the most popular rhyming systems in Chinese poetry after the Tang dynasty and the official standard in later dynasties.

== History ==
Pingshui Yun possibly originated as an abridged version of the rhyme dictionary Guangyun, whose 206-rhyme system was criticized for being overly restrictive. The system was traditionally attributed to Song dynasty scholar Liu Yuan (劉淵), whose 1252 work Renzi Xinkan Libu Yunlüe (壬子新刊禮部韻略) divided common Chinese characters in poetry into 107 rhyme categories. However, in 1223, Xinkan Yunlüe (新刊韻略) was already published by Wang Wenyu (王文鬱) of the Jin dynasty. The latter's contents were almost identical to Renzi Xinkan Libu Yunlüe, with the only difference being that Liu's book splits the rhyme category 迥 into two. A book unearthed from the Mogao Caves named Paizi Yun (排字韻) implies that the system was already widely circulated at the time.

Both works have since been lost. In the Yuan dynasty, Yunfu Qunyu by Yin Shifu (陰時夫) first named the 106-category version as Pingshui Yun. The origin of the name "Pingshui" is unclear. Traditionally, it is believed that "Pingshui" refers to Liu Yuan's hometown in modern Linfen, Shanxi. Alternatively, "Pingshui" may refer to a government post in charge of tax for fishing.

In the Yuan, Ming and Qing dynasties, the Pingshui Yun system was highly influential as the Yunfu Qunyu version served as the official standard in the imperial examinations. Although modern Chinese phonology has become significantly different from Middle Chinese, the system is still being used by some poets today.

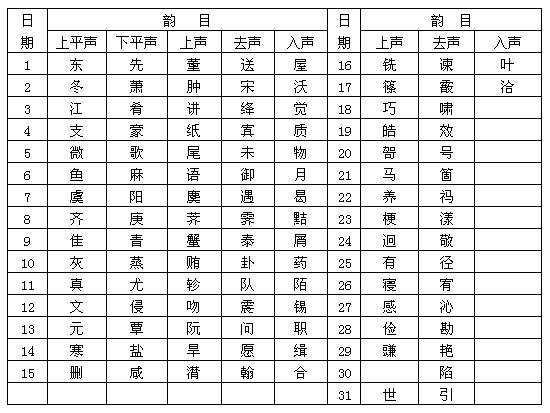
Representation of dates with Pingshui Yun

In addition to literary usage of this rime system, in early modern China when sending telegraphs were expensive, the words in Pingshui Yun were used to represent dates in order to reduce the number of characters as shown on the table on the right.

== Rhyme categories ==
The following chart lists all 106 rhyme groups of the Pingshui Yun system and the modern Standard Mandarin pronunciation of the representative characters.

Pingshui rhyme groups by tone
平 level	上 rising	去 departing	入 entering
東 dōng	董 dǒng	送 sòng	屋 wū
冬 dōng	腫 zhǒng	宋 sòng	沃 wò
江 jiāng	講 jiǎng	絳 jiàng	覺 jué
支 zhī	紙 zhǐ	寘 zhì	
微 wēi	尾 wěi	未 wèi	
魚 yú	語 yǔ	御 yù	
虞 yú	麌 yǔ	遇 yù	
齊 qí	薺 jì	霽 jì	
		泰 tài	
佳 jiā	蟹 xiè	卦 guà	
灰 huī	賄 huì	隊 duì	
真 zhēn	軫 zhěn	震 zhèn	質 zhì
文 wén	吻 wěn	問 wèn	物 wù
元 yuán	阮 ruǎn	願 yuàn	月 yuè
寒 hán	旱 hàn	翰 hàn	曷 hé
刪 shān	潸 shān	諫 jiàn	鎋 xiá
先 xiān	銑 xiǎn	霰 xiàn	屑 xiè
蕭 xiāo	篠 xiǎo	嘯 xiào	
肴 yáo	巧 qiǎo	效 xiào	
豪 háo	晧 hào	號 hào	
歌 gē	哿 gě	箇 gè	
麻 má	馬 mǎ	禡 mà	
陽 yáng	養 yǎng	漾 yàng	藥 yào
庚 gēng	梗 gěng	映 yìng	陌 mò
青 qīng	迥 jiǒng	徑 jìng	錫 xī
蒸 zhēng			職 zhí
尤 yóu	有 yǒu	宥 yòu	
侵 qīn	寑 qǐn	沁 qìn	緝 qì
覃 tán	感 gǎn	勘 kàn	合 hé
鹽 yán	琰 yǎn	豔 yàn	葉 yè
咸 xián	豏 xiàn	陷 xiàn	洽 qià
