= Fu Zai =

Chinese police dog

- Other name: 福仔
- Species: Dog
- Breed: Corgi
- Sex: Male
- Born: August 28, 2023 (age 3)
- Occupation: Police dog
- Employer: Weifang Public Security Bureau
- Years active: 2024—present

Fu Zai (Chinese: 福仔; pinyin: Fú zǐ) is a corgi dog from China, the first dog of the breed to work as a police dog in China. He has accumulated attention for his presence on social media and for being an unusual breed of police dog.

== Early life ==
Fu Zai was born on August 28, 2023. His name roughly translates to "Lucky Boy". His original owner was a pet vlogger named Zhao Shan. He was recruited as a police dog in October 2023 after a police dog trainer encountered Fu Zai and his owner and observed that he had qualities that would make him trainable as a police dog, including strong food motivation and a love for people.

== Police career ==
Fu Zai began his police training with the Weifang police department in January 2024, and graduated as a police dog for the Weifang Public Security Bureau in October of that year. Though corgis are not conventionally used as police dogs, as they have a reputation for being distractable and overly playful, Fu Zai's trainers said his low center of gravity and short legs proved to be an advantage, allowing him to access spaces normally inaccessible to police dogs. He has worked as bomb-sniffing dog. He is the first corgi to work as a police dog in China.

In 2025, Fu Zai was disciplined through the loss of his Lunar New Year bonus of treats and toys for having a "fed up expression" and for urinating in his food bowl. The clip of Fu Zai's loss of his bonus went viral on social media, which shows an officer playfully taking away the treats and toys and Fu Zai barks and runs after him. Users on Weibo expressed sympathy for Fu Zai, with one user writing that Fu Zai "worked hard all year, only to find its year-end bonus gone. This is so relatable." In another incident, Fu Zai took a bite from a sausage held by kindergardener while patrolling, leading to his trainer promising to tighten his discipline and visiting the kindergardener's classroom with Fu Zai to apologize.

== Social media presence ==
Fu Zai has attracted attention on the Chinese social media site Douyin, where an account entitled "Fu Zai and his comrades" amassed over 400,000 followers. The Washington Post has characterized Fu Zai's social media presence as part of ongoing efforts by police in China "to present a softer image."
