= Liu Zhiji =

Chinese historian and author

Liu Zhiji (simplified Chinese: 刘知几; traditional Chinese: 劉知幾; pinyin: Liú Zhījī; Wade–Giles: Liu Chih-chi; c.661 – c.721), (Note: Liu's biographies in both Books of Tang recorded that he died at the age of 61 (by East Asian reckoning). His biography in the Old Book of Tang recorded that his eldest son Liu Kuang committed a crime in 721. When Zhiji tried to intercede on his son's behalf, an angered Emperor Xuanzong banished him to Anzhou; he died shortly after reaching Anzhou.) courtesy name Zixuan (子玄), (Note: Liu's biographies in both Books of Tang refer to him by his courtesy name; the New Book of Tang recorded that Liu went by his courtesy name while he was alive as his name violated the naming taboo of Emperor Xuanzong of Tang, whose name was Li Longji.) was a Chinese historian and politician of the Tang dynasty. Well known as the author of Shitong, he was born in present-day Xuzhou, Jiangsu. Liu's father Liu Zangqi (Note: Zangqi has his own biographies in part 1 of vol.190 of Old Book of Tang and vol.201 of New Book of Tang.) and elder brother Liu Zhirou were officials, famous for their literary compositions. He received his imperial examination degree in 680 and began working on several compilations with others in the court in 699. In 708, he decided to resign himself and started compiling the Shitong.

Stephen W. Durrant calls Liu Zhiji "one of ancient China's most critical and brilliant readers". (Note: See The Cloudy Mirror, pages 71–72. Liu is quoted criticizing Sima Qian's style for verbosity and deliberately setting apart the chronologically close accounts.)
