= Yao Silian =

Chinese politician and historian (564–637)

- 姚思廉
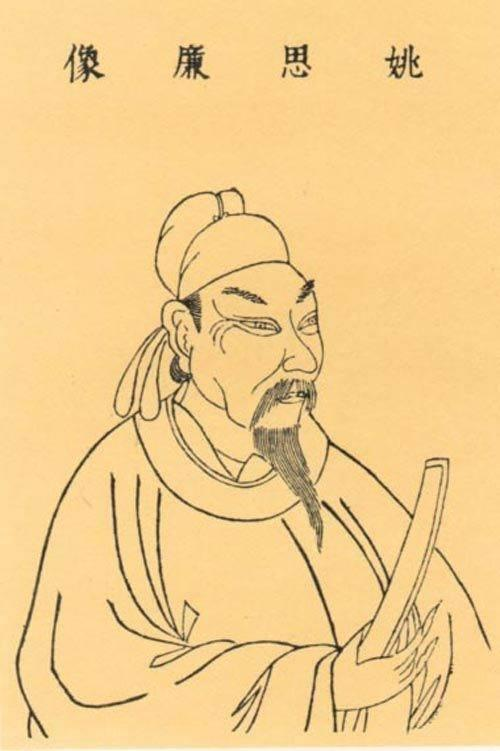
- Yao Silian, as portrayed in the Ming dynasty encyclopedia Sancai Tuhui
- Born: c. Chen dynasty
- Died: 637
- Occupations: Writer, historian, politician
- Title: Baron of Fengcheng County (豐城縣男)
- Father: Yao Cha

Academic work
- Era: Sui dynasty, Tang dynasty
- Notable works: Book of Liang, Book of Chen

Yao Silian
- Chinese: 姚思廉
Transcriptions
Standard Mandarin
- Hanyu Pinyin: Yáo Sīlián
- Wade–Giles: Yao Ssu-lien

Yao Silian (姚思廉; died 637), courtesy name Jianzhi (簡之), formally the Baron of Fengcheng (豐城縣男), posthumous name Kang (康), was a Chinese historian and politician during the Sui dynasty and Tang dynasty. He was the lead author of the Book of Liang and Book of Chen, the official histories of the Liang dynasty and the Chen dynasty, which his father Yao Cha (姚察), a Chen official, had begun but did not finish.

== Background ==
It is not known when Yao Silian was born, other than that it was likely during the Chen dynasty. His father Yao Cha (533 - 606) was the minister of civil service affairs during Chen, and after Chen's destruction by rival Sui dynasty in February 589, Yao Cha moved his family from Wuxing (吳興, in modern Huzhou, Zhejiang) to the Sui capital Daxing (Chang'an), successively serving as an advisor to Emperor Wen of Sui's crown prince Yang Yong and the secretary general of the Palace Library, carrying the title of Duke of Beijiang. During Yao Cha's life, he had begun to write the histories of Chen and its predecessor Liang dynasty but was unable to complete it before his death.

Yao Silian studied the Book of Han under his father when he was young. It was said that he had few desires other than to study. Prior to Chen's destruction, he served as a military officer under Chen Boxin, the seventh son of Emperor Wen of Chen, and as a registrar (主簿) to Chen Zhuang (陳莊) the Prince of Kuaiji, the eighth son of Chen's last emperor Chen Shubao in the mid-to-late 580s.

== During the Sui dynasty ==
After Chen's destruction, Yao Silian served as a military advisor to Emperor Wen's son Yang Liang the Prince of Han. Due to Yao Cha's death, he resigned in 606 to observe a mourning period; before his death, Yao Cha had also implored Yao Silian to finish his histories. After the mourning period, Yao Silian served as a secretary at the government of Hejian Commandery (河間, roughly modern Baoding, Hebei). He requested permission from Emperor Wen's son and successor Emperor Yang to continue writing the histories of Liang and Chen that Yao Cha had started, and Emperor Yang agreed. Emperor Yang further ordered him and another official, Cui Zujun (崔祖濬), to lead a team of scholars in drafting regional maps and histories. He later served as a teacher of Emperor Yang's grandson Yang You the Prince of Dai.

By 617, the Sui state was engulfed by agrarian rebellions, and Emperor Yang was in Jiangdu (江都, in modern Yangzhou, Jiangsu), leaving Yang You nominally in charge of Chang'an, when the general Li Yuan the Duke of Tang started a rebellion and attacked Chang'an, claiming that his intent was to make Yang You emperor. When Chang'an fell in winter 617, it was said that Yang You's staff all fled, except for Yao Silian, who stayed with Yang You, and as Li Yuan's soldiers entered Yang You's mansion, yelled out sternly, "The Duke of Tang started his uprising in order to secure the imperial clan. You cannot be impolite to the Prince." The soldiers backed off. Li Yuan was impressed with Yao's dedication to Yang You, and while he still had Yang You seized by his own subordinates, allowed Yao to accompany Yang You to Shunyang Pavilion (順陽閣) before leaving. People who witnessed the event commented, "It is said that kind people are also brave. This man is an example." Li Yuan soon declared Yang You emperor (as Emperor Gong), but after receiving news in 618 that Emperor Yang had been killed in a coup at Jiangdu led by the general Yuwen Huaji, had Yang You yield the throne to him, establishing the Tang dynasty as Emperor Gaozu.

== During the Tang dynasty ==
After the founding of the Tang dynasty, Yao Silian served as a scholar at the mansion of Emperor Gaozu's son and leading general Li Shimin the Prince of Qin. Later, when Li Shimin was on a campaign against a rival agrarian rebel ruler, Xu Yuanlang the Prince of Lu, Li Shimin had some discussions with others about the events during the Sui dynasty, and he commented, "Yao Silian dared to stand up to swords to show his faithfulness, and this was difficult even in ancient days." At that time, Yao was not with him, but was at Luoyang. Li Shimin sent a messenger to Luoyang to award Yao with silk, stating, "I have just remembered your faithfulness and righteousness and I am now awarding you for them."

In 626, Li Shimin, then locked in an intense rivalry with his brother Li Jiancheng the Crown Prince, ambushed and killed Li Jiancheng and another brother who supported Li Jiancheng, Li Yuanji the Prince of Qi, at Xuanwu Gate. He then effectively forced Emperor Gaozu to create him crown prince and then yield the throne to him (as Emperor Taizong). Yao became an imperial scholar at the institute Hongwen Pavilion (弘文館). Emperor Taizong had him continue the compilation of the histories of Liang and Chen, under supervision by the chancellor Wei Zheng. Yao, taking in also commentaries that had been written by Xie Gui (謝炅) and Gu Yewang (顧野王), completed the works in 636, and Emperor Taizong awarded him with silk and promoted him to be Tongzhi Sanqi Changshi (通直散騎常侍), a senior advisor at the examination bureau of government (門下省, Menxia Sheng). It was said that Yao was faithful and gave honest advice whenever needed. In 632, for example, there was an occasion when Emperor Taizong was about to visit the summer palace Jiucheng Palace (九成宮, in modern Baoji, Shaanxi), when Yao argued against it, opining that visiting secondary palaces was something that Qin Shi Huang and Emperor Wu of Han did, not what rulers who were even better regarded—the legendary Emperor Yao, Emperor Shun, Yu the Great, and Tang of Shang did. Emperor Taizong, while citing that he was going to Jiucheng Palace to avoid an asthma attack, nevertheless awarded Yao with silk. In 635, he created Yao the Baron of Fengcheng. Yao died in 637 and was buried with honor, near the tomb of Emperor Taizong's wife Empress Zhangsun, where Emperor Taizong himself would eventually be buried. His grandson Yao Shu would later serve as a chancellor during the reign of Emperor Taizong's daughter-in-law Wu Zetian.
