= Fan Yun =

Fàn Yun (c. 451–15 June 503) (simplified Chinese: 范云; traditional Chinese: 范雲) was born in Wuyin (舞阴) (in the northwest of today's Biyang County (泌阳县), Zhumadian Prefect, Henan Province) and lived during the Liu Song, Southern Qi and Liang dynasties. He learned to write poems at the age of eight and had a quick wit. He was a personal friend of Emperor Wu, founder of the Liang dynasty, and held authority as Wu's de facto chancellor, although he died less than two years into Emperor Wu's reign. Fàn was a member of the elite Fàn family.

== See also ==
- Yongming poetry
