= Shen Wuhua =

Wife of emperor Chen Shubao

Shen Wuhua (Chinese: 沈婺華) dharma name Guanyin (觀音; c. 554 – c. 630), was an empress consort of the Chen dynasty of China. Her husband was Chen Shubao, the last emperor of the dynasty.

Shen Wuhua's father, Shen Junli (沈君理), was a junior official during the reign of Chen dynasty's founder Emperor Wu; the emperor, impressed by his abilities, created for Shen Junli the title Marquess of Wangcai (望蔡侯) and gave Shen Junli his eldest daughter the Princess Mu of Kuaiji (会稽穆公主, "Mu; 穆" being her posthumous name) as his wife. Shen Wuhua was born of the Princess Kuaiji around the year 554 CE. Shen Junli subsequently served under Emperor Wu's nephews, Emperor Wen and Emperor Xuan. When Princess Kuaiji died, Shen Wuhua mourned her greatly and was praised for her filial piety.

In 569, Shen Wuhua married Chen Shubao, who was then the crown prince under his father, Emperor Xuan. Her age at the time of their marriage is not known; he was 16. They did not have any sons together, but when Chen Shubao's concubine, Sun, died in childbirth in 573, Shen Wuhua raised the boy, Chen Yin, as her own. Her father, Shen Junli, died later that year, and she again mourned greatly. He was given the posthumous name Zhenxian (貞憲).

In 582, Emperor Xuan died. Chen Shubao survived a failed coup attempt, albeit with substantial injuries, by his brother Chen Shuling (陳叔陵), Prince of Shixing, and his cousin Chen Bogu (陳伯固) the Prince of Xin'an. After taking the throne, Chen Shubao enthroned Shen Wuhua as empress, and Chen Yin as crown prince. However, as he did not favor her, she was not allowed to attend to him during his injuries--only Zhang Lihua, his favorite concubine, was allowed to.

Empress Shen was said to be solemn and had few desires, spending much of her time studying the Chinese classics, history, and Buddhist sutras as well as practicing calligraphy. She did not participate much in Chen Shubao's feasting, and he did not favor her, instead greatly favoring his Consort Zhang, who effectively took over the governance of the palace. Empress Shen had few complaints about that, however, and she lived a frugal life, limiting her staff to about 100 people and not using elaborate decorations, often submitting suggestions to Chen Shubao. In 588, believing in accusations that Chen Yin despised him for not favoring Empress Shen, Chen Shubao deposed him and replaced him with Consort Zhang's son, Chen Yuan. He also considered deposing Empress Shen and replacing her with Consort Zhang, but had not had a chance to carry this out before Sui dynasty forces captured the capital Jiankang in 589, seizing him and ending the Chen dynasty, unifying China.

Consort Zhang was executed by the Sui general, Gao Jiong, but Chen Shubao was spared and taken to the Sui capital, Chang'an, to be treated as an honored guest of Emperor Wen of Sui. Empress Shen followed Chen Shubao to Chang'an. She wrote deeply mournful texts to commemorate him when he died in 604. Earlier that year, Emperor Wen had died as well and was succeeded by his son, Emperor Yang of Sui, who, during his reign, undertook 11 journeys through various parts of the empire and often had Empress Shen accompany his train. She was with his train in Jiangdu (江都, in modern Yangzhou, Jiangsu) in 618, when he was killed in a coup led by the general Yuwen Huaji. After Emperor Yang's death, Empress Shen crossed the Yangtze south to Pi-ling city (毗陵, modern Changzhou in Jiangsu province), where she became a Buddhist nun with the name Guanyin ("Avalokiteśvara") in 618.

Guanyin died early in the reign of Emperor Taizong of Tang (626–649), but the exact year is not known.

== Ancestry ==
Ancestors of Shen Wuhua

8. Shen Sengce
4. Shen Xun
2. Shen Junli, Marquess Zhenxian of Wangcai
1. Empress Shen Wuhua
24. Chen Daoju
12. Chen Wenzan
6. Emperor Wu of Chen
13. Lady Dong
3. Princess Mu of Kuaiji

Chinese royalty
Preceded by Empress Liu	Empress of the Chen dynasty 582 – 589	Dynasty ended
Preceded by Empress Liu	Empress of China (Southeastern); 582 – 589	Succeeded by Empress Dugu of the Sui dynasty
