= The Broken Mirror Restored =

Chinese folklore

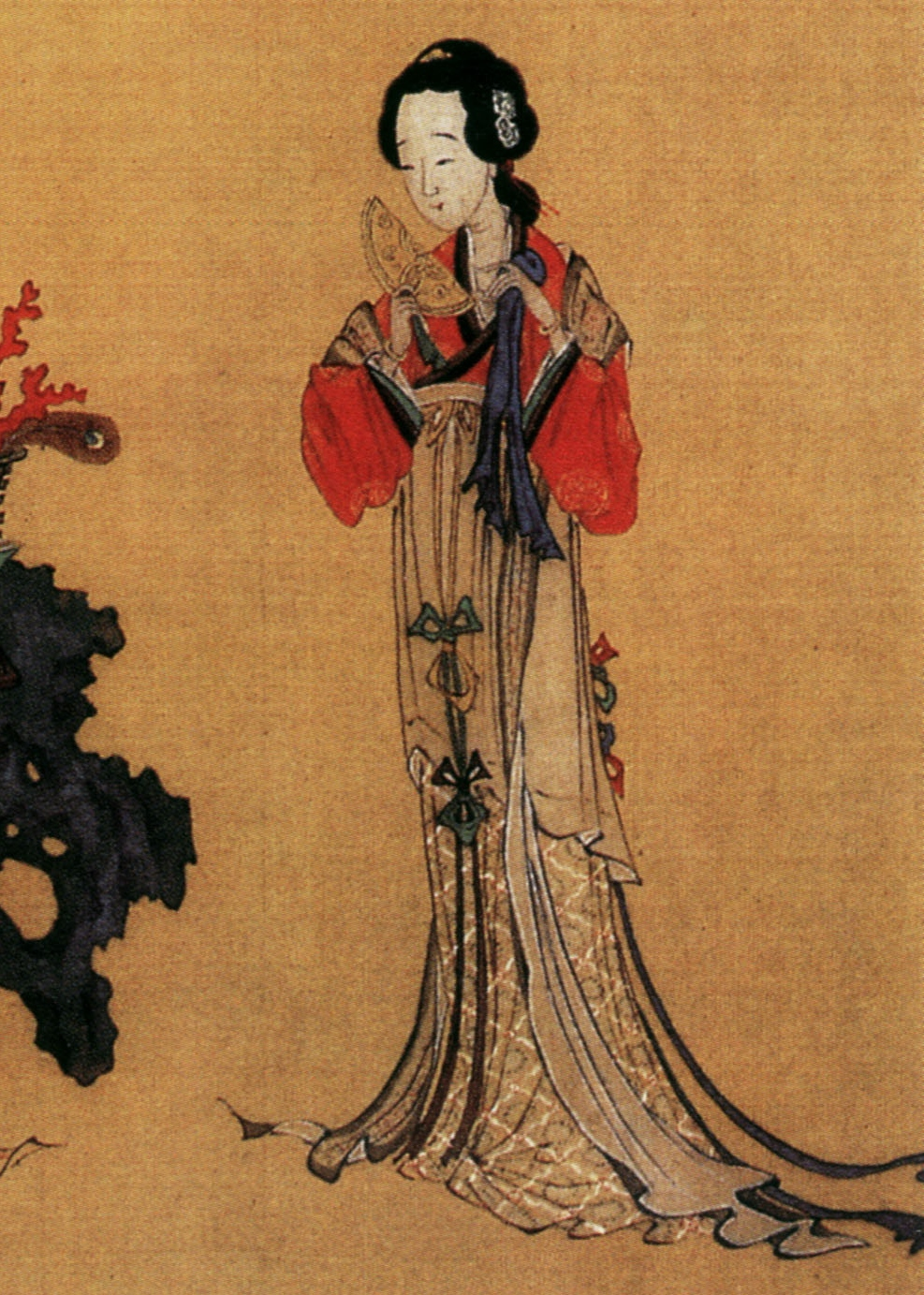
Ming era illustration of Princess Lechang, the female protagonist of the tale.

The Broken Mirror Restored (Chinese: 破镜重圆; pinyin: Pò jìng chóng yuán) is a Chinese classic romantic folklore about the separation and reunion of an aristocratic couple using their broken mirrors. The story is alleged to have occurred at the end of the 6th century during the transition from Northern and Southern dynasties to the Sui dynasty.

Although the authenticity and origin of the story is debated, the story circulated widely in Chinese and Japanese literature and influenced future dynasties. The phrase "broken mirror restored", or "broken mirror joined together" has been used as an idiom to suggests the happy reunion of a separated couple.

== Story plot ==
The main protagonist of the story were Princess Lechang (樂昌公主) and her husband, Xu Deyan (徐德言). Their love story was not recorded in official historical annals, but was mentioned in the New Record of the Two Capitals (兩京新記, Liangjing xinji) written by Wei Shu (韋述) and Poetry Stories (本事诗) by Meng Qi (孟啟).

Princess Lechang was alleged to be the daughter of Emperor Xuan of Chen (568–582) and sister of Emperor Houzhu of Chen (582–589). She married Xu Deyan (徐德言), a retainer of the Crown Prince (太子舍人, Crown Prince's Servant). However, in 589 ACE, the Chen dynasty was destroyed by the Sui dynasty. Knowing their inevitable separation in such turbulent event, Xu told his wife: "When the country falls, you will certainly be taken into a powerful house. If your love for me doesn't die, I hope we will have a chance to be together again." The couple then broke a handheld mirror into two, each person kept on half of the mirror as a mean of identification at the future reunion. Xu later escaped from the Sui army onslaught, while Princess Lechang was captured by the Sui forces. The Sui Emperor then awarded the Princess to the State Duke of Yue, Yang Su, as a concubine. Princess Lechang was quickly favoured by Yang Su, Yang even had a separate cloister built for Lechang. However Lechang was still unhappy and could never forget her former husband.

After a while, at the First Full Moon Festival in Sui capital, Xu Deyan brought the mirror half to the capital market to seek for his lost wife. He managed to find the other half of the mirror sold at an unreasonably high price by an old man. Xu told the seller the story behind the broken mirror and asked the seller to delivered a poem to his master:

镜与人俱去，
镜归人不归。
无复嫦娥影，
空留明月辉。

Translation:

The mirror and the person are gone
The mirror returns. The person doesn't
I don't see the Chang'e's shadow
Bright and empty moonlight lingers.

Princess Lechang instantly realized the poem's author was her lost husband and burst into tears. Yang Su was also moved by the Princess's love story and finally allowed her to remarry Xu Deyan.

It is said that Yang Su asked Princess Lechang to write a poem to describing this incident. The Princess's poem was written as:

今日何遷次,
新官對舊官。
笑啼俱不敢
方驗作人難。

Translation:

How bewildered I am today
When my new and old masters come face to face
I dare neither laugh nor cry
For now I feel the pain of being human.

== Controversial authenticity ==
Some scholars have questioned the story's authenticity and claimed that this story was made up at the Middle Tang era due to several reasons:

1. There was no record in the Book of Chen of Xu Deyan as the prince consort of the Chen dynasty. The only recorded prince consort was Kong Bayu (孔伯鱼).
2. The Sui army's commander-in-chief was not allowed to rob Chen princess as his concubine like Yang Su was alleged to do in the folktale.
3. The Chen Emperor's family and court was spared by the Sui army and were relocated to the Sui capital Chang'an. If Xu Deyan was the prince consort, he would be escorted properly to Chang'an, too.
4. At the time of Sui's invasion against Chen, Yang Su's reputation was not high enough to take a Chen princess as his concubine. Moreover, Sui Empress Consort Wenxian was notorious for her hatred of polygamy and concubines; Yang Su would definitely get on her bad side if he really did take the Princess as a concubine.
5. It was very hard for a broken (and therefore, unvaluable) mirror to be sold at a Chang'an market and due the sheer size of the capital, it was very hard for Xu Deyan to figure out the location of the keeper of his wife's mirror piece.

However, Chen Shangjun, a professor at Fudan University argued that the story of Princess Lechang might be historically reliable due to several reasons:

1. It is true that Sui Empress Consort Wenxian hated concubines the act of taking concubine, but not all people fell victim to her wraith. For example, He Ruobi (賀若弼) was able to take a Chen princess as concubine and if a person like He could, then Yang Su definitely also could.
2. Considering the date of New Record of the Two Capitals (兩京新記), it is impossible that the story was made up by people at the middle Tang Dynasty.
3. Xu Deyan is not recorded in official history annals but was mentioned in other documents. The genealogical work Yuanhe Xingzuan recorded Xu Deyan worked at the position of "Crown Prince's Servant" (太子舍人) of the Chen dynasty and Sigong of the Bo province (蒲州司功) in the Sui dynasty.

Graham Sanders argued that it might not be simply a coincidence that a pre-Tang background (Sui dynasty) is set as the background of the story plot. One sign of the pre-Tang context is that it is the true lovers are "man and wife", rather than "man and singing girl" or "man and concubine". Once the "stolen love" story enter the Tang period, the naive power of the poems seen in such story became more complicated and conditional.
