= Chen Yuan (disambiguation) =

Chen Yuan may refer to:

- Chen Yuan (prince) (574–?), Chen dynasty prince
- Chen Yuan (historian) (1880–1971), Chinese historian
- Chen Yuan (born 1945), Chinese economist and politician
- Chen Yuan (water polo) (born 1989), Chinese water polo player
