= Xiao Mohe =

Xiao Mohe (Chinese: 蕭摩訶; 532–604), courtesy name Yuanyin (元胤), was a general of the Chinese Chen and Sui dynasties. He initially served in the military in the late Liang dynasty, and gradually grew in stature and fame during the reigns of each of the emperors of Chen dynasty. When Sui forces attacked Chen in 589, Xiao resisted, and his defeat and capture sealed Chen's fate, allowing Sui to destroy Chen and unify China proper. He later served under Emperor Wen of Sui's son, Yang Liang, the Prince of Han, and became a major proponent of Yang Liang's rebellion against his brother, Emperor Yang of Sui, in 604. However, he was unable to stand against the attack led by the general Yang Su, and was captured and executed.

== During the Liang dynasty ==
Xiao Mohe was born in 532, during the reign of Emperor Wu of Liang. When he was less than 10 years old, his father Xiao Liang (蕭諒) was made a commandery official at Shixing Commandery (始興, roughly modern Shaoguan, Guangdong), and Xiao Mohe accompanied his father to the commandery. His father died while in service there, and at that time, Cai Luyang (蔡路養), who had married either his sister or his aunt, was a member of the local gentry at nearby Nankang Commandery (南康, roughly modern Ganzhou, Jiangxi), and Cai took him and raised him. As Xiao Mohe grew in age, he became known for being resolute and strong.

In 548, the rebel general Hou Jing rose against Emperor Wu and by 549 had captured the capital Jiankang, taking Emperor Wu and his crown prince Xiao Gang (the eventual Emperor Jianwen) hostage. In winter 549, the ambitious general Chen Baxian raised an army at Guang Province (廣州, roughly modern Guangdong) and planned to march north, eventually to head to Jiankang to attack Hou. His path, however, was blocked by Cai, who then controlled Nankang as a local warlord. Xiao served in Cai's forces and fought so fiercely that none of Chen's soldiers was a match for him, but eventually Cai was defeated, and Xiao surrendered. Xiao became a subordinate of Chen's commander Hou Andu. He was part of Chen's campaign, as Chen joined with Wang Sengbian, the chief general of Xiao Yi the Prince of Xiangdong (the eventual Emperor Yuan), to destroy Hou Jing.

By 556, Chen was the regent over Emperor Jing, Emperor Yuan's son and the chief among the claimants for the Liang throne after Emperor Yuan's capture and execution by Western Wei in 555, after Chen ambushed and killed Wang Sengbian and deposed Xiao Yuanming, the candidate favored by Emperor Wenxuan of Northern Qi who was declared emperor by Wang. Wang's subordinates Ren Yue (任約) and Xu Sihui (徐嗣徽) sought Northern Qi aid in resisting Chen, and Northern Qi forces soon arrived in Jiankang's vicinity. Chen sent Hou Andu to engage Northern Qi forces. Before battle, Hou commented to Xiao, "You are famed for your ferocity in battle, but seeing is better than hearing." Xiao responded, "I will let you see today." During the battle, Hou was having a hard time and was nearly captured by the enemy forces. Xiao experienced a surge of fury, roaring fiercely and single-handedly fighting through the frontlines to save Hou from Northern Qi soldiers, and no men could stop him. Eventually, Hou was able to repel Northern Qi forces, and for his accomplishments was created a duke. It is not clear whether and how Xiao was awarded, although it was said that Xiao was one of the few subordinates that Hou treated with respect and honor.

== During the Chen dynasty ==
In 557, Chen Baxian seized the throne from Emperor Jing, establishing Chen dynasty as its Emperor Wu. Xiao Mohe's superior, Hou Andu, served as a major general under Emperor Wu, and became particularly prominent after Emperor Wu died in 559 and was succeeded by his nephew Emperor Wen. However, Hou came under Emperor Wen's suspicions in 563, and Emperor Wen forced him to commit suicide. The impact of Hou's death on Xiao's career is unclear, but prior to Hou's death he participated with distinction in the campaigns against the warlords Liu Yi (留異) (561-562, a campaign commanded by Hou) and Ouyang Ge (歐陽紇) (569-570), and for those accomplishments he was eventually promoted to the post of governor of Bashan Commandery (巴山, roughly modern Ji'an, Jiangxi).

It was as the governor of Bashan Commandery that Xiao served under the major general Wu Mingche in 573 as Wu, commissioned by Emperor Wen's brother Emperor Xuan, led a campaign against Northern Qi, seeking to capture the region between the Yangtze River and the Huai River. The Chen forces under Wu were intimidated by a small vanguard force in the Northern Qi army, commanded by the Xianbei generals Wei Pohu (尉破胡) and Zhangsun Honglüe (長孫洪略), this elite squad consisted of tens of sturdy looking fighters with great physical strength and they were all above 1.9 metres tall, and accompanied by a sharpshooting Eurasian bowsman from the Western Regions (Xiyu). Wu informed Xiao of this, while praising him as having fortitude equivalent to Guan Yu and Zhang Fei. In response, Xiao first sought out the Xiyu bowsman, charged forward and killed him with a dart, and then dozens of fighters from the elite squad came forth and challenged Xiao to a small battle, Xiao fought fiercely and eventually slew all of them, leading to the Northern Qi forces' losing morale and collapsing. Wei fled, while Zhangsun was killed in battle. Wu was eventually able to capture all of the region between the Yangtze and the Huai later that year. For Xiao's contributions, he was created the Count of Lianping and soon promoted to the rank of marquess. During the subsequent minor campaigns against Northern Qi over the next several years, Xiao also contributed.

After Northern Zhou destroyed Northern Qi and conquered its territory in 577, Emperor Xuan wished to contend for the Xu Province (徐州, roughly modern Xuzhou, Jiangsu) region, and he sent Wu to attack the region in winter 577. Xiao served under Wu. Initially, Wu defeated the Northern Zhou governor of Xu Province Liang Shiyan, forcing Liang to withdraw inside Pengcheng (彭城, the capital of Xu Province) and defend it. Wu put Pengcheng under siege. In spring 578, the Northern Zhou general Wang Gui arrived with a force to lift the siege, and he, as his first step, cut off Wu's supply route (and escape path). Xiao Mohe advised Wu to attack Wang as quick as he could to prevent the supply route from being cut off, but Wu did not follow Xiao's suggestion. Soon, the Chen forces were trapped. Wu subordinates suggested destroying the levee near Pengcheng so that the area would flood, allowing them to escape by ships. Wu agreed, but believing that he, as the commanding general, should withdraw last, did so, sending Xiao with the cavalry first. The cavalry was therefore able to escape, but most of the foot soldiers—30,000—and Wu himself were captured by Wang and taken to the Northern Zhou capital Chang'an. Xiao was able to return to Jiankang and continued to serve as a general under Emperor Xuan. In 580, after Northern Zhou captured the region between the Yangtze and Huai from Chen, Emperor Xuan made an attempt to recapture the territory, and Xiao served in the campaign along with Emperor Xuan's nephew Chen Huiji (陳慧紀), but after he was unable to capture Guangling (廣陵, in modern Huaiyin, Jiangsu), he withdrew. Another campaign waged by Xiao and Zhou Luohou (周羅睺) in 581 also ended in failure.

In 582, Emperor Xuan died, and his son Chen Shuling (陳叔陵) tried to assassinate the crown prince Chen Shubao, but only managed to wound, not kill, Chen Shubao. Chen Shuling fled back to his mansion and mobilized troops under his command, and he made overtures to Xiao Mohe, asking Xiao to join his coup attempt. Xiao initially pretended to agree, and when Chen Shuling sent his associates Dai Wen (戴溫) and Tan Qi (譚騏) to confer with Xiao, Xiao beheaded them and hang their heads on the city walls. Chen Shuling's troops lost morale and collapsed, and he was killed. For Xiao's contribution, Chen Shubao, who soon took the throne, created Xiao the Duke of Suijian and awarded Chen Shuling's considerable wealth to Xiao. He also selected Xiao's daughter to be the wife and crown princess of his son and crown prince Chen Yin. He also granted Xiao several honors normally reserved for the highest-ranked officials. He subsequently made Xiao the governor of Southern Xu Province (南徐州, roughly modern Zhenjiang, Jiangsu), to defend against potential attacks by Northern Zhou's successor state Sui dynasty from Guangling.

In spring 589, when Xiao was at Jiankang, the Sui general Heruo Bi (賀若弼) took the chance to cross the Yangtze (as part of the overall campaign by Emperor Wen of Sui to destroy Chen and reunited China) and captured Jingkou (京口, the capital of Southern Xu Province). Soon, Heruo arrived at Zhongshan (now Purple Mountain), near Jiankang, and Xiao volunteered to engage Heruo. Chen Shubao agreed, despite warnings by another major general, Ren Zhong (任忠), not to engage Heruo. Xiao's own motivation level was said to be low, however, due to an affair that Chen Shubao was having with Xiao's wife. Heruo defeated him and captured him. Heruo threatened him with beheading, and yet Xiao would not prostrate himself. Heruo was impressed and spared Xiao. Subsequently, Heruo captured Chen Shubao as well, and Xiao obtained permission to cook and serve Chen Shubao one final meal from the Chen imperial kitchen as well as to make a tearful farewell—acts that greatly impressed Sui's Emperor Wen.

== During the Sui dynasty ==
Emperor Wen made Xiao Mohe a general, but unlike the situation with Zhou Luohou, did not give him great responsibilities. However, when Xiao Mohe's son Xiao Shilüe (蕭世略) participated in resistance campaigns by former Chen subjects against Sui rule, Emperor Wen pardoned Xiao Mohe from any punishments that he would otherwise have suffered based on Xiao Shilüe's rebellion, on the basis that Emperor Wen believed that Xiao Shilüe was forced to participate.

In August 604, when Emperor Wen died and was succeeded by Emperor Yang, Xiao was serving under Emperor Yang's brother Yang Liang the Prince of Han, who was the commandant at Bing Province (并州, roughly modern Taiyuan, Shanxi). Yang Liang, not willing to yield to Emperor Yang, rebelled in c.September 604, a rebellion encouraged by Xiao and Wang Kui (王頍, Wang Sengbian's son). However, when Xiao engaged Emperor Yang's general Yang Su, Yang Su defeated and captured him, and then had him executed. His sons were not killed but were seized as imperial servants, and his subordinate Chen Zhishen (陳智深) took his body and gave it a proper burial.
