= Chen Yin (6th century) =

Crown prince of the Chinese Chen dynasty

Chen Yin (Chinese: 陳胤) (born 16 April 573), courtesy name Chengye (承業), was a crown prince of the Chinese Chen dynasty.

Chen Yin was the first son of his father Chen Shubao, who was crown prince under Chen Yin's grandfather Emperor Xuan at the time of Chen Yin's birth. Chen Yin's mother Consort Sun died in childbirth, and Chen Shubao's wife Crown Princess Shen Wuhua, mournful of her death, took Chen Yin and raised him as her own son. As Chen Shubao was already 20 at the time of Chen Yin's birth—a relatively late age to have a son in those times—Emperor Xuan had Chen Shubao designate Chen Yin as his heir even though Chen Yin was not born of Crown Princess Shen, and further awarded a bowl of wine to each father in the realm. In 578, he was created the Duke of Yongkang.

In 582, Emperor Xuan died, and Chen Shubao, after surviving a coup attempt, became emperor. He created Chen Yin's adoptive mother Crown Princess Shen empress and Chen Yin crown prince. Chen Shubao selected the daughter of the general Xiao Mohe to be Chen Yin's wife and crown princess.

Chen Yin was said to be intelligent and studious, but also often made mistakes. When his chief of staff Yuan Xian (袁憲) urged him to change his ways, he would not accept Yuan's suggestion. Meanwhile, Empress Shen was not favoured by Chen Shubao, whose favourite concubines were Consort Zhang Lihua and Consort Kong. As Empress Shen and Chen Yin often exchanged messengers, Chen Shubao suspected that Chen Yin despised him for not favouring Empress Shen. Consorts Zhang and Kong, assisted by the high-level official Kong Fan (孔範, who, although he was not related to Consort Kong, referred to her as his sister), began to make accusations against Chen Yin before Chen Shubao. In 588, Chen Shubao thus decided to depose Chen Yin and make Consort Zhang's son Chen Yuan the Prince of Shi'an crown prince, despite Yuan's opposition. In summer 588, he deposed Chen Yin and demoted him to the title of Prince of Wuxing, creating Chen Yuan crown prince instead. Chen Shubao then considered deposing Empress Shen as well and replacing her with Consort Zhang, but as the rival Sui dynasty captured the Chen capital Jiankang in 589, ending the Chen dynasty and unifying China proper, that did not occur.

Chen Shubao was taken to the Sui capital Chang'an and treated as an honoured guest of Emperor Wen of Sui, and Chen Yin followed his father to Chang'an. He died there, but there is no historical record of the year of his death. Unlike many of his brothers, there was also no record that he served as an official to the Sui dynasty, so he probably died fairly early.
