= Zhide =

Zhide may refer to:

- Worth It (album), known as Zhide in Mandarin, a 1996 Mandopop album by Sammi Cheng

== Historical eras ==
- Zhide (至德, 583–586), era name used by Chen Shubao, emperor of the Chen dynasty
- Zhide (至德, 756–758), era name used by Emperor Suzong of Tang
