= Liu Jingyan =

Chinese empress (531–616)

- Born: 531
- Died: 20 March 615 (aged 83–84)
- Spouse: Emperor Xuan of Chen
- Issue: Chen Shubao
- Father: Liu Yan
- Mother: Princess Changcheng

Empress Liu (531 – 20 March 615), personal name Liu Jingyan (Chinese: 柳敬言), was an empress of the Chinese Chen dynasty. Her husband was Emperor Xuan (Chen Xu). She briefly governed as regent during the illness of her son Chen Shubao in 582.

== Background ==
Liu Jingyan was born in 531 when her father Liu Yan (柳偃) was a Liang dynasty official. His wife was Princess Changcheng, a daughter of Emperor Wu of Liang. (The traditional histories imply that she was the princess' daughter, but do not clearly state so.) Liu Yan came from a lineage of officials, as his grandfather Liu Shilong (柳世隆) was a key general under Emperor Gao of Southern Qi and Emperor Wu of Southern Qi, and his father Liu Yun (柳惲) was a Liang official. When Liu Yan died while being governor of Poyang Commandery (鄱陽, roughly modern Shangrao, Jiangxi), Liu Jingyan, having no older brothers (she had one younger brother, Liu Pan (柳盼)), managed the affairs of the household. After the rebel general Hou Jing attacked the capital Jiankang in 548 and captured it in 549, Liu Jingyan and Liu Pan went to Jiangling to rely on Princess Changcheng's brother Xiao Yi the Prince of Xiangdong. On account of the princess, Xiao Yi treated them with kindness.

== Marriage to Chen Xu ==
In 552, after Xiao Yi's general Wang Sengbian defeated Hou, Xiao Yi declared himself emperor (as Emperor Yuan). He rewarded Wang and his lieutenant Chen Baxian, while requesting Chen Baxian to send his son Chen Chang and nephew Chen Xu to Jiangling, his new capital, to serve in his administration—but also to serve as hostages. While Chen Xu was at Jiangling, Emperor Yuan married Liu Jingyan to him as his wife, notwithstanding that he had already married a Lady Qian while he was a commoner at his home commandery of Yixing (義興, roughly modern Huzhou, Zhejiang). In 553, she bore Chen Xu a son, Chen Shubao. In 554, Western Wei forces attacked and captured Jiangling, and around the new year 555, they put Emperor Yuan to death. Chen Xu and Chen Chang were taken to the Western Wei capital Chang'an as honored captives, while Lady Liu and Chen Shubao were left at Rangcheng (穰城, in modern Nanyang, Henan).

In 557, Chen Baxian seized the throne and established the Chen dynasty as its Emperor Wu. While Chen Xu was then still detained at Chang'an, he remotely created Chen Xu the Prince of Shixing. Subsequently, when Emperor Wu died in 559, because Chen Baxian's son Chen Chang was still detained at Chang'an as well, Chen Xu's brother Chen Qian succeeded Emperor Wu (as Emperor Wen). In 562, following negotiations, Western Wei's successor state Northern Zhou agreed to allow Chen Xu to return to Chen. Later that year, after further negotiations, Lady Liu and Chen Shubao were allowed to return to Chen as well. As Chen Xu then carried the title of Prince of Ancheng, she carried the title of Princess of Ancheng.

In 566, Emperor Wen died and was succeeded by his son Emperor Fei. Chen Xu, as the young emperor's uncle, was in an honored position, sharing power with the officials Dao Zhongju (到仲舉), Kong Huan (孔奐), Yuan Shu (袁樞), and Liu Shizhi (劉師知). However, Chen Xu soon came into a power struggle with Dao and Liu, and in 567, after Liu made a failed attempt to have Chen Xu removed from the palace, Chen Xu forced him to commit suicide, and subsequently forced Dao to commit suicide as well. He was now in control of the imperial government. In winter 568, he had an edict issued in the name of Emperor Wu's wife Grand Empress Dowager Zhang Yao'er deposing Emperor Fei and giving him the throne. In spring 569, he formally took the throne as emperor (as Emperor Xuan). He created Princess Liu as empress and her son Chen Shubao as crown prince.

== As empress consort ==
Empress Liu was said to be beautiful, tall, and humble. Cognizant that Emperor Xuan had married Lady Qian as his wife before marrying her, but that Lady Qian had been subordinated to the lesser imperial consort title of Guifei (貴妃), she humbled herself when in Consort Qian's presence, often offering the better items to Consort Qian and taking the lesser items for herself.

In spring 582, Emperor Xuan became ill. Crown Prince Shubao, as well as his brothers Chen Shuling (陳叔陵) the Prince of Shixing and Chen Shujian (陳叔堅) the Prince of Changsha, attended to Emperor Xuan. Chen Shuling, who wanted the throne for himself, secretly had a dull knife designed to cut medications sharpened. When Emperor Xuan died, Crown Prince Shubao, while mourning his father, placed himself over the casket. Chen Shuling stabbed him in the neck with the knife, and he fell to the ground. When Empress Liu saw this, she intervened, but she was also stabbed several times by Chen Shuling, who was however then hit by the lady in waiting Lady Wu and was unable to kill Chen Shubao. Subsequently, Chen Shuling fled out of the palace and staged a military coup, along with his cousin Chen Bogu (陳伯固) the Prince of Xin'an (Emperor Wen's son). Because Chen Shubao had been seriously wounded, Empress Liu, while also herself injured, took control of the situation, and the imperial troops were able to defeat Chen Shuling's and Chen Bogu's. Both were killed. Chen Shuling's sons were also killed, while Chen Bogu's sons were demoted to commoner status.

== As empress dowager ==
Chen Shubao then assumed the throne, and Empress Liu took the title of empress dowager. As Chen Shubao was continuing to recover from his injuries, the various urgent matters at hand—including Emperor Xuan's funeral arrangements, the border defenses (as Chen had recently lost the region between the Huai River and the Yangtze River to Northern Zhou's successor state Sui dynasty), and other important matters, were ruled on by Empress Dowager Liu, assisted by Chen Shujian. When Chen Shubao recovered, she returned the imperial authorities to him and no longer ruled on governmental matters.

When Chen fell to Sui in 589, Chen Shubao and his clan were taken to Chang'an. Empress Dowager Liu went to Chang'an as well. She subsequently took up residence at Sui's eastern capital Luoyang. She died there in 615 and was buried in Luoyang, not with her husband Emperor Xuan.

== Notes and references ==
- Book of Chen, vol. 7.
- History of the Southern Dynasties, vol. 12.
- Zizhi Tongjian, vols. 168, 170, 175.

Chinese royalty
Preceded by Empress Wang	Empress of Chen Dynasty; 569–582	Succeeded by Empress Shen Wuhua
