= Chen Yuan (prince) =

Crown prince of the Chen dynasty of China

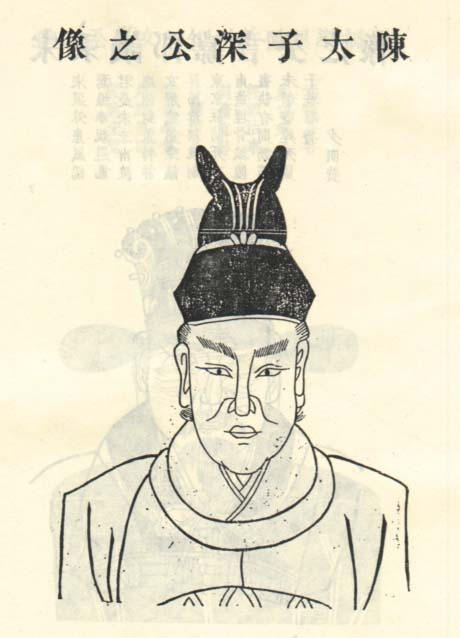
Prince Chen Yuan

Chen Yuan (Chinese: 陳淵), also referred to as Chen Shen (Chinese: 陳深) due to the naming taboo of the Emperor Gaozu of Tang, courtesy name Chengyuan (承源), was a crown prince of the Chen dynasty of China.

Chen Yuan was the fourth son of Chen Shubao, and the oldest son of Chen Shubao's favorite concubine Consort Zhang Lihua. His exact birth year is not known. At the time of Chen Yuan's birth, Chen Shubao was crown prince under Chen Yuan's grandfather Emperor Xuan. On her account, Chen Shubao also greatly favored Chen Yuan, but at the order of Emperor Xuan, Chen Yuan's older brother Chen Yin, Chen Shubao's oldest son, was designated heir. (Chen Yin was also not born of Chen Shubao's wife Crown Princess Shen Wuhua, but Crown Princess Shen raised him after Chen Yin's mother Consort Sun died in childbirth in 573).

Emperor Xuan died in 582, and Chen Shubao, after surviving a coup attempt, became emperor. He created Chen Yin crown prince, and in 583 created many of his sons, including Chen Yuan, imperial princes (in Chen Yuan's case, the Prince of Shi'an). Chen Yuan was said to be composed and intelligent in his youth, and not even his attendants could tell his emotions easily. In 588, Chen Shubao, after believing in accusations against Chen Yin, deposed Chen Yin and created Chen Yuan crown prince instead.

In 589, Sui dynasty forces captured the Chen capital Jiankang, ending the Chen dynasty and unifying China proper. When soldiers under the command of the Sui general Han Qinhu (韓擒虎) entered the crown prince's palace, Chen Yuan's staff largely fled, but Chen Yuan, said to be then a teenager, himself solemnly sat within his hall to wait for the soldiers to enter, attended only by Kong Boyu (孔伯魚). When the Sui soldiers entered, Chen Yuan greeted them, neither overly arrogantly nor overly self-deprecating, with, "You have marched a long way, and I can see that you are tired." The Sui soldiers, impressed, treated him with respect.

Chen Yuan's mother Consort Zhang was executed by the Sui general Gao Jiong, who blamed her for Chen's collapse. Chen Shubao, however, was not harmed, and was taken to the Sui capital Chang'an as an honored guest of the Emperor Wen of Sui. Chen Yuan followed his father to Chang'an. During the reign of Emperor Wen's son Emperor Yang of Sui, Chen Yuan was made the governor of Fuhan Commandery (枹罕, roughly modern Linxia, Gansu). By the time that Sui fell and was replaced by Tang dynasty, however, he was back in Chang'an, and he served as a mid-level official early in the reign of Emperor Gaozu of Tang. He died early in Emperor Gaozu's reign (618-626), but the exact year is not known.
