= Chen Shubao =

Emperor of the Chen dynasty from 582 to 589

Chen Shubao 陳叔寶
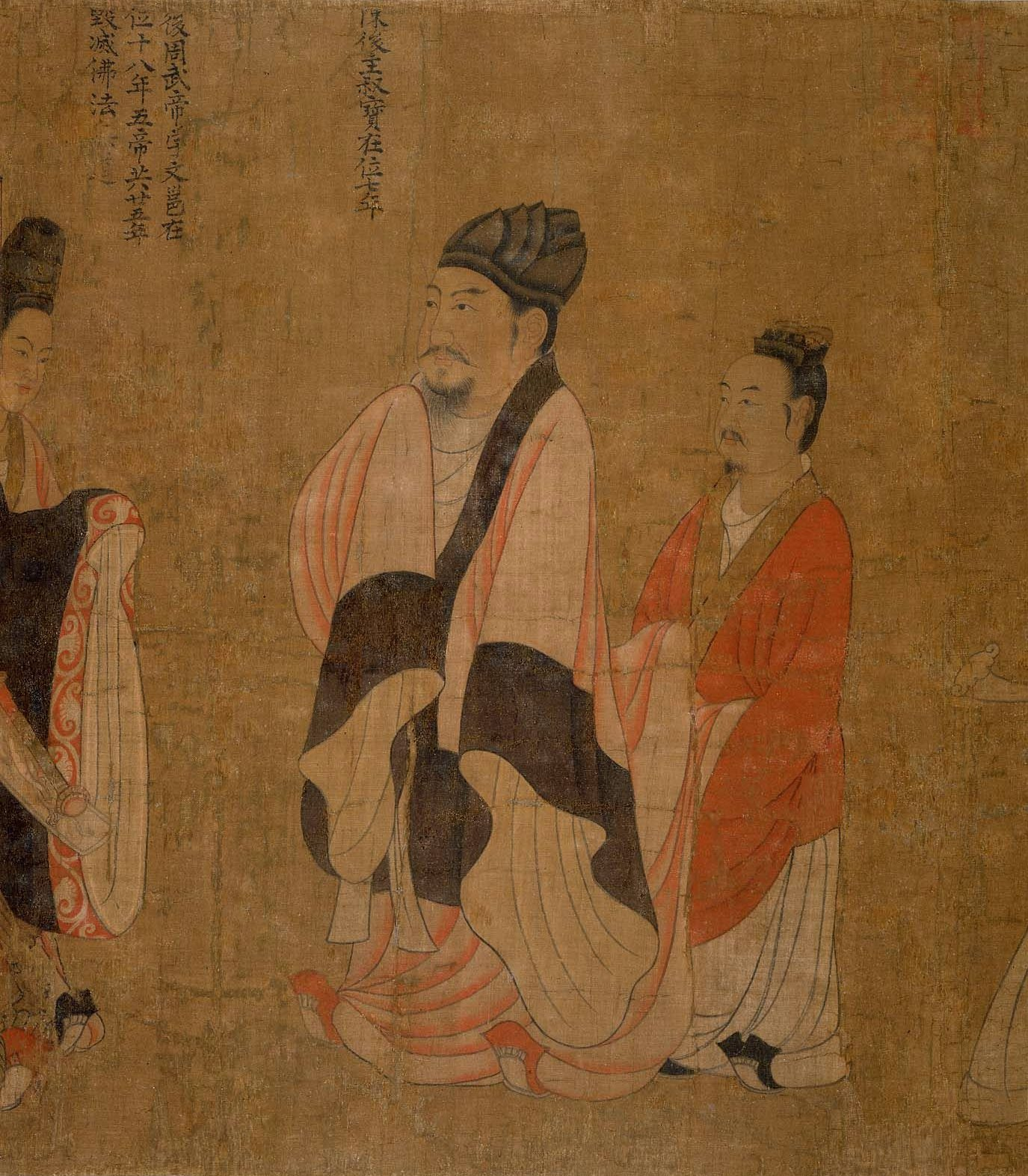
- Tang dynasty portrait of Emperor Houzhu by Yan Liben

Emperor of the Chen dynasty
- Reign: February 20, 582 – February 10, 589
- Predecessor: Emperor Xuan
- Born: Chen Huangnu (陳黃奴); December 10, 553
- Died: December 16, 604 (aged 51)
- Consorts: Shen Wuhua of Wuxing
Names
- Family name: Chen (陳); Given name: Shubao (叔寶); Courtesy name: Yuanxiu (元秀); Childhood name: Huangnu (黃奴)
Era dates
- Zhide (至德): 583–586; Zhenming (禎明): 587–589
Posthumous name
- Duke Yang of Changcheng (長城煬公)
- Dynasty: Chen dynasty
- Father: Emperor Xuan
- Mother: Lady Liu Jingyan of Hedong

Chen Shubao (Chinese: 陳叔寶; pinyin: Chén Shúbǎo, 10 December 553 – 16 December 604), also known as Houzhu of Chen (陳後主; Chén Hòuzhǔ; 'Last Ruler of Chen'), posthumous name Duke Yáng of Chángchéng (長城煬公; Chángchéng Yáng Gōng), courtesy name Yuánxiù (元秀), childhood name Huángnú (黃奴), was the fifth and last emperor of the Chinese Chen dynasty, which was conquered by the Sui dynasty in 589.

At the time of his ascension, Chen was already facing military pressure by Sui on multiple fronts, and, according to traditional historians, Chen Shubao was an incompetent ruler who was more interested in literature and women than in state affairs.

In February 589, Sui forces captured Chen's capital, Jiankang (modern Nanjing, Jiangsu), and captured him, ending Chen's rule and unifying China after nearly three centuries of division that had started with the upheaval of the Five Barbarians. He was taken to the Sui's capital Chang'an, where he was treated kindly by Emperor Wen of Sui and his son and successor, Emperor Yang of Sui until his death in December 604, during the reign of Emperor Yang.

== Background ==
Chen Shubao was born in 553, when his father Chen Xu was serving as a mid-level official under Emperor Yuan of Liang at the capital of Jiangling. His mother was Chen Xu's second wife, Liu Jingyan, and he was Chen Xu's eldest son.

In 554, the Western Wei attacked Jiangling and captured it, executing Emperor Yuan. Emperor Yuan's nephew Xiao Cha was made Emperor Xuan of Western Liang (萧詧) and given Jiangling as his capital, but a large segment of Jiangling's population and Emperor Yuan's officials, including Chen Xu and Chen Xu's cousin Chen Chang, were taken to the Western Wei capital of Chang'an. For reasons lost to history, Lady Liu and Chen Shubao were not taken to Chang'an, but left at Rang City (穰城; Ráng chéng, now in Nanyang, Henan province).

In 557, Chen Xu's uncle and Chen Chang's father Chen Baxian founded a new dynasty as Emperor Wu of Chen with his capital at Jiankang. He requested that Western Wei's successor state, Northern Zhou, return Chen Chang and Chen Xu to him, but Northern Zhou, while initially agreeing, did not do so during Emperor Wu's lifetime. In 559, Emperor Wu died, and Chen Xu's older brother Chen Qian, Prince of Linchuan, as Emperor Wu's only close male relative in the realm, took the throne as Emperor Wen of Chen. In 560, Northern Zhou began making overtures to return Chen Xu to Chen. In 562, Emperor Wen, who had remotely created Chen Xu the Prince of Ancheng, traded the city of Lushan (魯山, in modern Wuhan, Hubei) to Northern Zhou in exchange for Chen Xu's return. Initially, Chen Shubao and his mother Princess Liu were not returned, but after further negotiations by Emperor Wen, were returned. Chen Shubao was designated as Chen Xu's successor. He held minor offices during Emperor Wen's reign.

In 566, Emperor Wen died and was succeeded by his son, Crown Prince Chen Bozong, as Emperor Fei. The high-level officials that Emperor Wen left in charge, including Chen Xu, eventually became locked in a power struggle, and in 567, Chen Xu killed Liu Shizhi (劉師之) and Dao Zhongju (到仲舉) and seized control. In winter 568, he had an edict issued in the name of Emperor Wu's wife Grand Empress Dowager Zhang Yao'er that deposed Emperor Fei and he took the throne as Emperor Xuan in spring 569. Chen Shubao was made crown prince, and his mother, Princess Liu, was made empress.

== As crown prince ==
In fall 569, Chen Shubao married Shen Wuhua, the daughter of the official Shen Junli (沈君理), as his wife and crown princess. However, eventually he came to favor his concubine, Zhang Lihua.

As crown prince, Chen Shubao was known for his love of literature and feasting. He thus wanted to command the official Jiang Zong (江總), who was talented in literature, serve as his chief of staff, and he requested that Kong Huan (孔奐), the minister of civil service, to make it so. Kong declined, citing that Jiang, while talented, lacked steadiness and would not be able to correct Chen Shubao. Chen Shubao then personally made the request to his father Emperor Xuan, and Emperor Xuan, while he hesitated due to Kong's opposition, eventually agreed. Eventually, however, because Jiang and Chen Shubao overly feasted, including instances where Chen Shubao wore civilian clothing to sneak out of the palace to visit Jiang's mansion, Emperor Xuan removed Jiang from his post.

In spring 582, Emperor Xuan grew ill, and Chen Shubao, along with his brothers Chen Shuling (陳叔陵) the Prince of Shixing, and Chen Shujian (陳叔堅) the Prince of Changsha, attended Emperor Xuan at the palace. The ambitious Chen Shuling had ambitions for the throne, and when Emperor Xuan died, while Chen Shubao was mourning over Emperor Xuan's casket, Chen Shuling pulled out a sharpened knife and stabbed Chen Shubao in the neck, who then collapsed.

Empress Liu tried to stop Chen Shuling, but was also stabbed several times. However, the lady-in-waiting Lady Wu grabbed Chen Shuling, allowing Chen Shubao to get up and escape. Meanwhile, Chen Shujian grabbed Chen Shuling and tied him to a pillar, but as Chen Shujian then sought Chen Shubao's permission to kill Chen Shuling, Chen Shuling managed to slip away. Chen Shuling was then able to mobilize his personal troops and launch a coup together with his cousin, Chen Bogu (陳伯固) the Prince of Xin'an, Emperor Wen's son. They were soon defeated, however, and both were killed in battle. Chen Shuling's sons were forced to commit suicide, while Chen Bogu's sons were reduced to commoner rank.

Three days after the coup attempt, Chen Shubao, despite being severely wounded, took the throne. He honored his mother Empress Liu as empress dowager. He made his wife Lady Shen empress and his oldest son Chen Yin (who, while not born of Empress Shen, was raised by her) crown prince.

== Reign ==
Initially, Chen Shubao was still recovering from his injuries, and Empress Dowager Liu governed as regent, assisted by Chen Shujian. (As Chen Shubao did not favor Empress Shen, she was not allowed to attend to him during his recovery period; rather, Consort Zhang did.) After Chen Shubao recovered—and while it is not clear how long it took him to recover, it seemed to be a period of months—Empress Dowager Liu returned imperial authorities to him and did not again govern.

When Emperor Xuan died, Northern Zhou's successor state, Sui China, had been attacking Chen, but upon hearing about Emperor Xuan's death, Emperor Wen of Sui (Yang Jian) decided that it was improper to attack a state that had just lost its emperor and withdrew his forces. He also sent ambassadors to mourn Emperor Xuan's death, and his letter to Chen Shubao referred to himself by his personal name—a sign of humility. However, Chen Shubao's return letter included the sentence, "May it be that when you govern your state, all things can be well, and that between heaven and earth, there will be peace and quiet." The sentence was viewed as arrogant and condescending by Emperor Wen and his key official Yang Su and made them displeased. Despite this, however, for the next few years, the states exchanged ambassadors often and generally had peaceful relations, although Sui's Emperor Wen was gradually building up military power on the Yangtze and planning for eventual attack against Chen.

In spring 583, displeased that Chen Shujian was, in his view, becoming overly powerful, Chen Shubao, encouraged by his associates Kong Fan (孔範) and Shi Wenqing (施文慶), made Chen Shujian the governor of Jiang Province (江州, roughly modern Jiujiang, Jiangxi) to remove him from power. (He subsequently kept Chen Shujian at the capital by promoting him to the honorary post of Sikong (司空), but did not restore Chen Shujian to power.) Meanwhile, despite the fact that Chen Shubao was still supposed to be in mourning period for Emperor Xuan, he was spending much time in feasting. When the official Mao Xi (毛喜) tried to persuade him to change his ways, Chen Shubao demoted Mao and sent him out of the capital.

Around the new year 584, Chen Shujian, in fear, prayed to the spirits, hoping that he would be restored to grace. When this was discovered, Chen Shubao considered executing Chen Shujian, but after Chen Shujian reminded him how Chen Shujian was responsible for saving him from Chen Shuling, Chen Shubao spared him but removed him from his posts.

In 584, Chen Shubao built three particularly luxurious pavilions within his palace—Linchun Pavilion (臨春閣), Jieqi Pavilion (結綺閣), and Wangxian Pavilion (望仙閣), residing himself at Linchun Pavilion, while having Consort Zhang reside at Jieqi Pavilion and Consorts Gong and Kong share Wangxian Pavilion. He often spent his days feasting with his concubines, headed by Consort Zhang, as well as those ladies in waiting and officials who had literary talent (including Jiang Zong, whom he made prime minister, Kong Fan, and Wang Cuo (王瑳)), having those officials and ladies in waiting sing or write poetry to praise his concubines' beauty. Two of the particularly known songs, Yushu Houting Hua (玉樹後庭花) and Linchun Yue (臨春樂), were written to praise the beauties of Consorts Zhang and Kong.

It was said that Chen Shubao lacked interest and understanding in important governmental matters, and that because he could not comprehend matters well, he would often hold Consort Zhang on his lap and have Consort Zhang, who was considered intelligent, read and rule on the petitions submitted to him. Meanwhile, Consort Kong and Kong Fan, who were not related, began to refer to each other as sister and brother, and used their relationship to further their power as well, so Consorts Zhang and Kong became exceedingly powerful. To finance Chen Shubao's construction projects, taxes were raised, and soldiers and the officials, who were previously immune to taxes, were also required to pay them, causing general discontent from those classes. Further, at Kong Fan's urging, Chen Shubao transferred much of the military command to civilian officials, further causing the generals to be disgruntled.

In spring 585, Zhang Dabao (章大寶) the governor of Feng Province (豐州, roughly modern Fuzhou, Fujian), accused of corruption and on the verge of being replaced by Li Yun (李暈), instead ambushed Li and killed him, starting a rebellion. Zhang was however soon defeated and killed.

In fall 587, while Emperor Jing of Western Liang (Xiao Cong, Xiao Cha's grandson) was at the Sui capital to meet with Sui's Emperor Wen, the Western Liang officials Xiao Yan (蕭巖, Emperor Jing's uncle) and Xiao Huan (蕭瓛, Emperor Jing's brother), in fear that the Sui general Cui Hongdu (崔弘度) was actually intending to attack the Western Liang capital Jiangling, surrendered to Chen Shubao's cousin Chen Huiji (陳慧紀) the Marquess of Yihuang with the people of Jiangling. Chen Shubao accepted the surrender and made Xiao Yan and Xiao Huan provincial governors—acts that Emperor Wen (who, in response, abolished Western Liang and seized its remaining territory) considered provocation, making him continuing his preparation to attack Chen in earnest.

In spring 588, Chen Shubao, believing Consorts Zhang's and Kong's accusations that Chen Yin resented him for not favoring Empress Shen, deposed Chen Yin and created him the Prince of Wuxing, instead creating Consort Zhang's son Chen Yuan crown prince. He also considered deposing Empress Shen and replacing her with Consort Zhang, but did not get a chance to do so before Sui launched a major attack in spring 588 as well. By winter 588, the Sui attack was in full operation, with three major prongs commanded by Emperor Wen's sons, Yang Guang (later Emperor Yang of Sui) and Yang Jun, and Yang Su, and with Yang Guang in overall command of the operation, assisted by Gao Jiong. Reports from the upper Yangtze, however, were being suppressed by Shi Wenqing and Shen Keqing (沈客卿) and never reached Chen Shubao, as Shi, not realizing the seriousness of the Sui threat, did not want anything to interfere with his own plans to become the governor of Xiang Province (湘州, roughly modern Changsha, Hunan). Yang Su, who attacked from the upper Yangtze, therefore faced no serious opposition and soon controlled the upper Yangtze, not allowing any Chen forces which might have wanted to head downstream to aid the capital to be able to get through.

In spring 589, the Sui general Heruo Bi (賀若弼) crossed the Yangtze from Guangling (廣陵, in modern Yangzhou, Jiangsu), and the Sui general Han Qinhu (韓擒虎) crossed the Yangtze at Caishi (采石, in modern Ma'anshan, Anhui), without opposition from Chen forces and sandwiching the Chen capital Jiankang. Only then did Chen Shubao realize the seriousness of the situation, but instead of resisting in earnest, he panicked, leaving Shi in effective control of the situation. Eventually, the general Xiao Mohe convinced Chen Shubao that he should be allowed to engage Heruo, despite opposition from the general Ren Zhong (任忠). Heruo defeated Xiao Mohe and captured him, and the rest of Chen troops collapsed, allowing the Sui forces to enter the capital. In panic and abandoned by his officials, Chen Shubao hid in a well with Consorts Zhang and Kong, but was discovered and captured. When he was brought before Heruo, he was so fearful that he prostrated himself before Heruo—an act that brought words of contempt from Heruo. However, he and his household were generally treated well by the Sui generals, although Gao, blaming Consort Zhang for Chen's collapse, executed her. Some of the Chen generals continued to resist, but were quickly defeated, particularly because at the Sui forces' request, Chen Shubao wrote letters to the Chen generals ordering them to surrender. Chen was at its end. Soon, the Sui army escorted Chen Shubao and his household to the Sui capital Daxing (大興, near Chang'an).

== During the Sui Dynasty ==
Emperor Wen treated Chen Shubao with kindness, and, not willing to subjugate Chen Shubao as an official under him, initially did not give him any official titles—but was dismayed when Chen Shubao, not understanding the rationale, requested a title. Chen Shubao also engaged in heavy drinking, which Emperor Wen initially tried to curb, but later stopped doing so, reasoning that Chen Shubao needed to have something to do with his time. Emperor Wen sent members of the imperial Chen household out to the provinces, dividing them so that they could not coalesce.

In 594, Emperor Wen, citing the fact that the former emperors of Northern Qi, Liang, and Chen were not being sacrificed to, ordered that the former Northern Qi prince Gao Renying (高仁英), Chen Shubao and Xiao Cong be given regular supplies so that they could make periodic sacrifices to their ancestors.

In December 604, a few months after Emperor Wen's death and succession by Yang Guang (as Emperor Yang), Chen Shubao died. Emperor Yang posthumously created him the Duke of Changcheng (a title that his granduncle, Chen's Emperor Wu, carried at one point) and gave him the posthumous name of Yang (煬). (This would also be the posthumous name that Emperor Yang received from the succeeding Tang dynasty.)

== Family ==
- Empress, of the Shen clan of Wuxing (皇后 吳興沈氏; d. 628), second cousin, personal name Wuhua (婺華)
- Guifei, of the Zhang clan (貴妃 張氏; 559–589), personal name Lihua (麗華)
  - Chen Yuan (prince), Crown Prince (皇太子 陳淵; b. 575), fourth son
  - Chen Zhuang, Prince of Kuaiji (會稽王 陳莊), eighth son
- Guipin, of the Gong clan (貴嬪 龔氏)
  - Chen Qian, Prince of Nanhai (南海王 陳虔), fifth son
  - Chen Tian, Prince of Qiantang (錢唐王 陳恬; d. 589), 11th son
- Guipin, of the Kong clan (貴嬪 孔氏)
  - Chen Fan, Prince of Wu (吳王 陳蕃), tenth son
- Guipin, of the Lü clan (淑媛 呂氏)
  - Chen Yan, Prince of Yongjia (永嘉王 陳彥), third son
  - Chen Jing, Prince of Shaoling (邵陵王 陳兢), seventh son
- Guipin, of the Zhang clan (淑華 張氏)
  - Chen Zhi, Prince of Xinyi (信義王 陳祗), sixth son
- Guipin, of the Xu clan (淑儀 徐氏)
  - Chen Quan, Prince of Dongyang (東陽王 陳恮), ninth son
- Guipin, of the Gao clan (昭儀 高氏)
  - Chen Yi, Prince of Nanping (南平王 陳嶷; d. 589), second son
  - Princess Guangde (廣德公主), fourth daughter
    - Married Yang Guang (569–618) in 589
- Guipin, of the Xie clan (昭儀 謝氏)
  - Princess Lincheng (臨成公主), fifth daughter
    - Married Yang Jun (571–600) in 589
- Lady, of the Sun clan (孫氏; d. 573)
  - Chen Yin, Prince Wuxing (吳興王 陳胤; 573–589), first son
- Unknown
  - Chen Zong (陳總), 12th son
  - Chen Guan (陳觀), 13th son
  - Chen Ming (陳明), 14th son
  - Chen Gang (陳綱), 15th son
  - Chen Tong (陳統), 16th son
  - Chen Chong (陳沖), 17th son
  - Chen Qia (陳洽), 18th son
  - Chen Tao (陳絛), 19th son
  - Chen Chuo (陳綽), 20th son
  - Chen Wei (陳威), 21st son
  - Chen Bian (陳辯), 22nd son
  - Sixth daughter, personal name Chou (婤)
    - Married Yang Guang (569–618) in 606

Chinese royalty
Preceded by Emperor Xuan of Chen	Emperor of Chen Dynasty; 582–589	Dynasty ended
Preceded by Emperor Xuan of Chen	Emperor of China (Southeastern); 582–589	Succeeded by Emperor Wen of Sui
