= Chen dynasty =

Last of the Southern Dynasties in China (557–589)

Chen 陳
- 557–589
- The Chen dynasty at territorial peak with surrounding polities 576

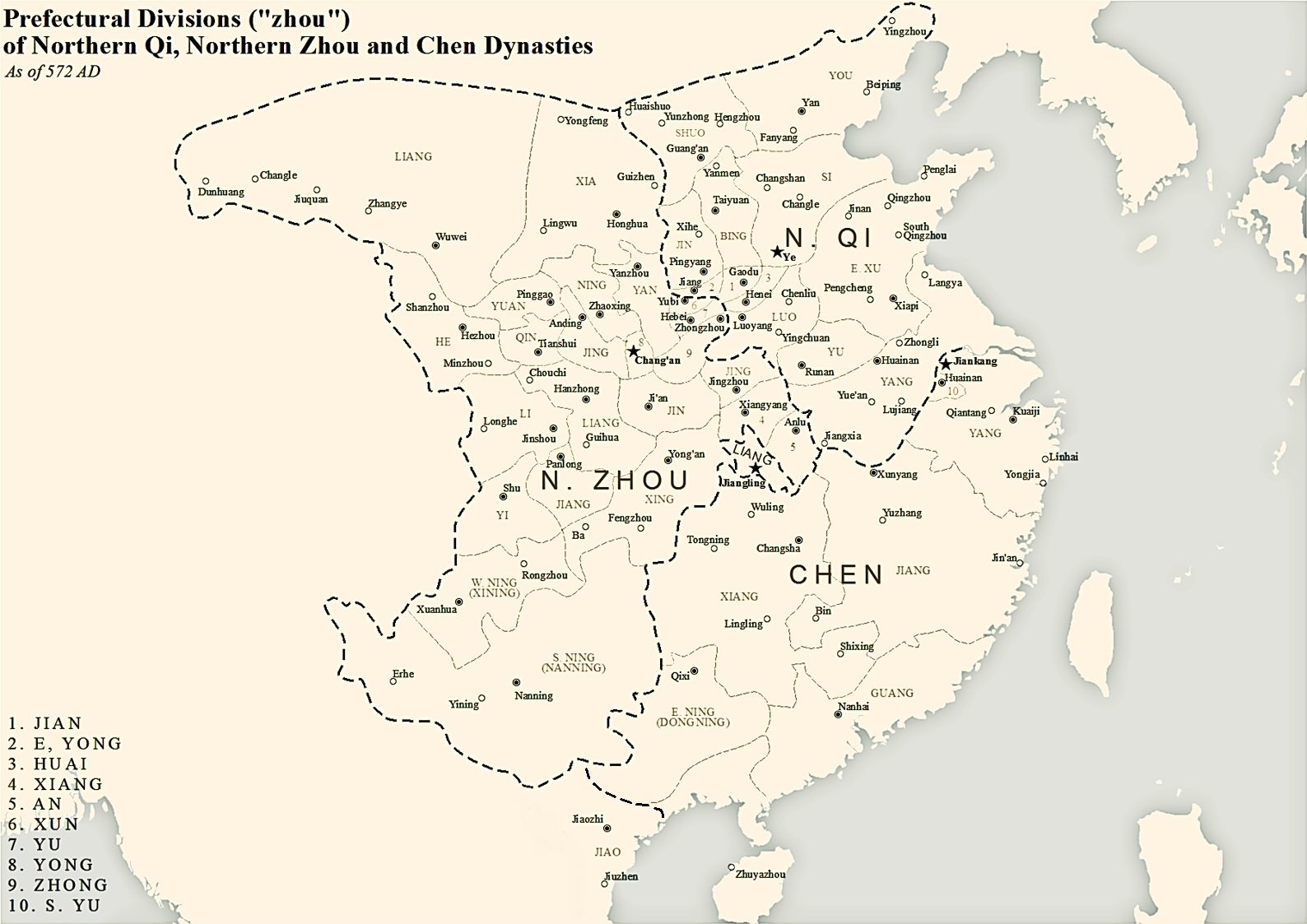
- Administrative divisions in 572
- Capital: Jiankang
- Government: Monarchy
- Emperor
  - 557–559: Emperor Wu of Chen
  - 559–566: Emperor Wen of Chen
  - 566–568: Emperor Fei of Chen
  - 569–582: Emperor Xuan of Chen
  - 582–589: Emperor Houzhu of Chen
- History
  - Established: 16 November 557
  - Disestablished: 10 February 589
  - Chen Shubao's death: 16 December 604
- Currency: Chinese coin, Chinese cash
Preceded by	Succeeded by
Liang dynasty	Sui dynasty
- Today part of: China; Vietnam

The Chen dynasty (traditional Chinese: 陳朝; simplified Chinese: 陈朝; pinyin: Chén Cháo), alternatively known as the Southern Chen (南陳 / 南朝陳) in historiography, was a Chinese imperial dynasty and the fourth and last of the Southern dynasties during the Northern and Southern dynasties period. Following the Liang dynasty, the Chen dynasty was founded by Chen Baxian (Emperor Wu). The Chen dynasty further strengthened and revitalized the economy and culture of southern China, and made territorial expansions northward, laying the foundation for future dynasties. It was conquered by the Sui dynasty in 589 AD, marking an end to the Northern and Southern dynasties period in Chinese history. The descendants of the Chen imperial family continued to hold powerful high-ranking positions in the imperial courts of both the Sui and Tang dynasties.

== History ==
=== Founding and expansion: Chen Baxian ===
In the twilight of the Liang dynasty (548–557), the Hou Jing Disturbance (侯景之乱) occurred. The insurrection caused the downfall and ruin of the Liang. In 557, Chen Baxian a former high-ranked Liang general, took the initiative to establish a new empire in Southern China: the Chen dynasty. Its founder Chen Baxian had been granted the title of "Prince of Chen", and on taking the throne he followed the Chinese practice of using his former princely title as the name of the new dynasty.

Chen Baxian was a visionary leader whose conquests helped revive the economy and culture of South China, bringing it to new heights. Near the start of the dynasty, Chen's northern neighbors the Eastern and Western Wei were later replaced by the Northern Zhou and Northern Qi, with the north of the Yangtze river held by the Qi, and the southwest including Sichuan was held by the Zhou. Chen Baxian defeated the Northern armies in one swoop, securing the prosperity and dominance of the Chen dynasty, and making further territorial gains in the north.

==== Vietnam: Defeating Lý Thiên Bảo ====
In 541, the people of Giao Châu Province (Chen northern Vietnam) rebelled under Lý Bôn. Xiao Ying sent the generals Sun Jiong (孫冏) and Lu Zixiong (盧子雄) to attack Lý Bôn, with Xiao Ying overseeing the operations. In spring 542, Xiao Ying and Xiao Zi ordered Sun and Lu to attack, but they lost to Lý, and soon infighting broke out between Sun, Lu, and another general Zhou. Xiao Ying then sent Chen Baxian to clean up the situation, and Chen Baxian defeated all of them, killing Du Tianhe and capturing Du Sengming and Zhou. Believing that Du Sengming and Zhou were both good soldiers, he released them and retained them on his staff. For this accomplishment, the Emperor Wu of Liang created Chen the Viscount of Xin'an and had an artisan draw a portrait of Chen.

In January 544, Lý Bôn proclaimed himself emperor and named his small state Vạn Xuân. In winter 544, Xiao Ying died, and initially, Chen started escorting Xiao Ying's casket back to Jiankang for burial. On the way, while he was still at Dayu Mountain (大庾嶺, on the borders of modern Jiangxi and Guangdong), he made a rendezvous with the new governor of Giao Châu Province, Yang Piao (楊瞟), and another nephew of Emperor Wu's, Xiao Bo (蕭勃), to attack Lý Bôn. Xiao Bao did not want to set out on the campaign, and therefore tried to persuade Yang not to advance. Chen persuaded Yang otherwise, and in spring 545, Yang, with Chen as his lieutenant, attacked Lý Bôn, defeating him and forcing him to flee into the mountains and conduct guerilla warfare instead. In 548, Lý Bôn died of illness, and when Lý Bôn's brother Lý Thiên Bảo succeeded him and attacked Ái Province (愛州, around modern Thanh Hóa Province, Vietnam), Chen defeated Lý Thiên Bảo. Emperor Wu made Chen the governor of Gaoyao Commandery (高要, Chen Zhaoqing, Guangdong) as well as the commander of the forces of the surrounding commanderies.

==== Hou Jing ====
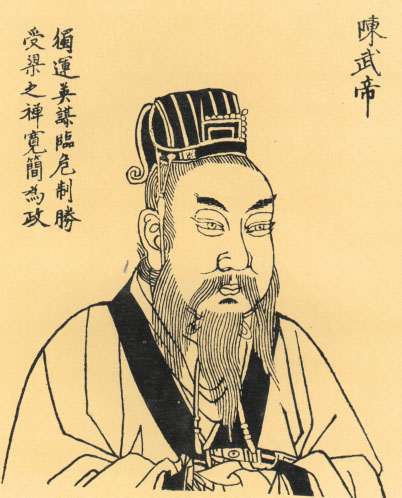
Emperor Baxian

In summer 548, Hou Jing, formerly a general of Eastern Wei (a successor state of the Northern Wei), rebelled and in 549 captured Jiankang, taking Emperor Wu of Liang and his son and crown prince Xiao Gang hostage. After Jiankang's fall, Hou, who had initially claimed that he wanted to restore Northern Wei's imperial clan to power, from the control of the regent Gao Cheng, enticed the governor of Guang Province, Yuan Jingzhong (元景仲), a member of Northern Wei's imperial Yuan clan, to join him. When Chen received the news, he publicly announced Yuan's treachery and gathered the troops of the nearby generals to attack Yuan. Yuan committed suicide, and Chen welcomed Xiao Bo, then the governor of Ding Province (定州, roughly Guangxi) to take over Guang Province. In winter 549, against Xiao Bo's request, Chen took his troops and embarked on a campaign to join the fight against Hou, sending messengers to Emperor Wu's son Xiao Yi the Prince of Xiangdong, the governor of Jing Province (荊州, central and western Hubei), pledging support and loyalty to Xiao Yi, then commonly viewed as the leader of the remaining Liang provinces not under Hou's control.

For the next year, Chen advanced north through modern Jiangxi, fighting the various local warlords and generals loyal to Hou, with his main struggle against Li Qianshi (李遷仕). In spring 551, he captured and killed Li. Xiao Yi made him the governor of Jiang Province (江州, around Jiangxi). By fall 551, he had rendezvoused with Xiao Yi's main general, Wang Sengbian, at Xunyang (尋陽, Chen Jiujiang, Jiangxi). In 552, after they had sworn a solemn oath to Liang, they advanced east toward Jiankang, where Hou Jing had killed Xiao Gang (who had succeeded Emperor Wu as Emperor Jianwen) and taken the throne himself as Emperor of Han. Chen Baxian was instrumental in the subsequent siege of Jiankang, and they defeated Hou Jing together, causing Hou to flee. Subsequently, Hou was killed by his own men. For Chen's contributions, Xiao Yi created Chen the Marquess of Changcheng—Chen's home county. Wang put Chen in charge of the important city Jingkou (京口, Chen Zhenjiang, Jiangsu). For the next two years, Chen fought several border battles against the Northern Qi. At times, when Xiao Yi summoned Wangon campaigns, Wang would putChen in charge of Jiankang.

==== Rise ====
At the time of his accession, Xiao Yi had sought aid from Western Wei, to attack rival claimant Xiao Ji's home base of Chengdu from the rear, and most of Xiao Ji's domain of Sichuan fell into Western Wei hands. In 554, Western Wei launched a major attack on Jiangling, and Emperor Yuan summoned Wang to come to his aid, putting Chen in charge of Jiankang. Before Wang could reach Jiangling, however, Western Wei had already captured Jiangling, killing Emperor Yuan and declaring his nephew Xiao Cha emperor instead (as Emperor Xuan). Wang and Chen refused to recognize Emperor Xuan; instead, in spring 555, they welcomed Emperor Yuan's 11-year-old son Xiao Fangzhi the Prince of Jin'an—Emperor Yuan's only surviving son—to Jiankang, preparing to make him emperor and first having him take the title Prince of Liang. When Jiankang fell, Chen's son Chen Chang and nephew Chen Xu, who had been serving in the imperial administration, were captured and taken to the Western Wei capital Chang'an as honored captives.

At this time, however, Emperor Wenxuan of Northern Qi had other ideas, and he sent his brother Gao Huan (高渙) the Prince of Shangdang to command an army to escort Emperor Yuan's cousin Xiao Yuanming the Marquess of Zhenyang—whom Eastern Wei had taken captive in 547—back to Liang to be emperor. Wang initially rejected Xiao Yuanming, but after his forces lost a few battles to Northern Qi forces, changed his mind and decided to accept Xiao Yuanming as emperor after extracting a promise from Xiao Yuanming to make Xiao Fangzhi crown prince. In summer 555, Xiao Yuanming arrived at Jiankang to take the throne, and he created Xiao Fangzhi crown prince. Wang and Chen continued to be in charge of the military.

Chen Baxian, however, was unhappy about the situation, believing Xiao Yuanming to be unworthy of the throne. Despite Wang Sengbian's knowledge of Chen's displeasure, however, Wang did not suspect Chen of having any rebellious intentions, as they had been friendly, and Wang and Chen had agreed on having Wang Sengbian's son Wang Wei (王頠) marry Chen's daughter. In fall 555, believing reports that Northern Qi was going to attack, Wang Sengbian sent his secretary Jiang Gan (江旰) to Jingkou to alert Chen. Chen Baxian turned on Wang Sengbian, killed him and took over control of the imperial government, forcing Xiao Yuanming to abdicate and making Xiao Fangzhi emperor (as Emperor Jing).

Chen Baxian initially sent his nephew Chen Qian and his general Zhou Wenyu against Wang Sengbian's son-in-law Du Kan (杜龕) and Du's ally Wei Zai (韋載). Meanwhile, Xu Sihui (徐嗣徽) and Ren Yue (任約), loyal to Wang Sengbian and aided by Northern Qi, made a surprise attack on Jiankang, nearly capturing it, but were repelled by Chen's general Hou Andu. Soon, Chen Baxian defeated Wei Zai, and Chen returned to Jiankang, leaving Zhou Wenyu to face Du Kan.

Despite Northern Qi aid, Xu Sihui and Ren Yue could not defeat Chen Baxian, and Chen put the city of Shitou, which the Northern Qi general Liu Damo (柳達摩) had captured, under siege. Liu sought peace, but requested Chen to send his relatives as hostages to Northern Qi. Most officials advocated peace, and Chen, despite his skepticism about such a peace holding, agreed, and sent his nephew Chen Tanlang (陳曇朗), Emperor Yuan's grandson Xiao Zhuang the Prince of Yongjia, and Wang Min (王珉), the son of the key official Wang Chong (王沖), as hostages, permitting Northern Qi forces to withdraw, and Xu Sihui and Ren Yue withdrew with them.

By spring 556, Du Kan had either been captured or surrendered to Zhou Wenyu and Chen Qian, and Chen Baxian executed Du. Wang Sengzhi fled to Northern Qi, and the capital region was largely under Chen Baxian's control. Meanwhile, Northern Qi forces were preparing another attack, but they invited Xiao Yuanming to their camp to discuss peace. Chen sent Xiao Yuanming to the Northern Qi camp, but before talks could begin, Xiao Yuanming died from a severe infection on his back. By summer 556, Northern Qi forces were again descending on Jiankang, but once there, their forces stalemated with Chen Baxian's forces. Northern Qi forces' food supplies soon ran out, and Chen defeated them, killing Xu Sihui and capturing a number of Northern Qi generals, whom Chen executed. Meanwhile, Hou Tian, having been defeated by another general, Hou Ping (侯平), chose to submit to Chen.

During the next year, Chen Baxian began to receive greater titles and offices, progressing from Marquess of Changcheng to Duke of Changcheng to Duke of Yixing to Duke of Chen to Prince of Chen. In 557, Xiao Bo declared a resistance against Chen from Guang Province. Soon, however, Zhou Wenyu defeated Xiao Bo's general Ouyang Wei (歐陽頠), and Xiao Bo was killed by his own generals. At the same time, Wang Lin, who controlled modern Hunan and eastern Hubei, suspicious of Chen's intentions, refused his summons to Jiankang and prepared for battle instead. Chen Baxian sent Zhou Wenyu and Hou Andu against Wang Lin. In winter 557, Chen Baxian had Emperor Jing yield the throne to him (killing him in the next summer), establishing the Chen dynasty as its Emperor Wu of Chen. He created Emperor Jing the Prince of Jiangyin. He posthumously honored his parents emperor and empress, his deceased wife Lady Qian empress, and his deceased son Chen Ke crown prince. He created his wife Zhang Yao'er empress. The general Lu Xida (魯悉達), who controlled Northern Jiang Province (北江州, roughly modern Anqing, Anhui), caused a stalemate by accepting overtures from both Emperor Wu of Chen and Wang Lin but refusing to actually obey either side. Wang Lin sought help from Northern Qi and requested that it return Prince Xiao Zhuang to be emperor. Soon, Northern Qi returned Xiao Zhuang, and Wang Lin declared Xiao Zhuang emperor at Ying Province (郢州, modern eastern Hubei). Emperor Wu of Chen negotiated a peace with Wang Lin, after Wang's general Yu Xiaoqing (余孝頃) was defeated by the independent general Zhou Di (周迪), satrap of Linchuan (Jiangxi).

=== Emperor Wen ===
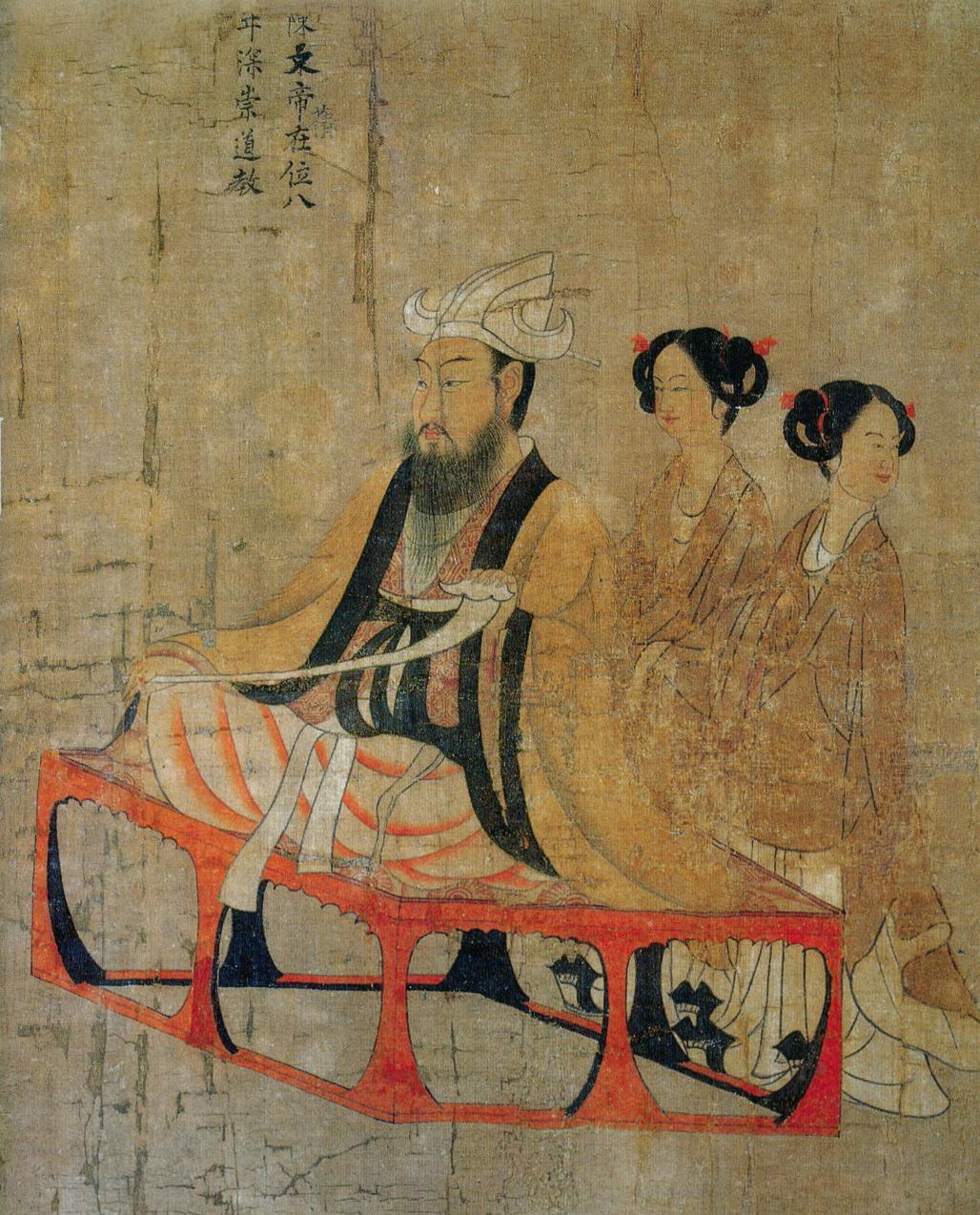
Tang dynasty portrait of Emperor Wen by Yan Liben.

In 559, Chen Baxian fell ill, and the throne was passed to his nephew Chen Geng or Emperor Wen of Chen. Hearing that Emperor Wu had died, Wang Lin launched a major attack on Chen in winter 559. He was initially successful, but by spring 560, Hou Tian defeated Wang, and both Wang and Xiao Zhuang fled to Northern Qi. Chen forces took about half of Xiao Zhuang's territory, while the other half went to the Northern Zhou-supported Western Liang. Hou Tian negotiated with the Northern Zhou for the Western Liang to cede this territory to the Chen in spring 561. Emperor Wen attacked warlord Zhou Di (in Jiangxi) and sent Hou Andu against another warlord, Liu Yi (留異), who controlled modern southern Zhejiang. By summer 562, Hou had defeated Liu Yi, forcing him to flee to his son-in-law, Chen Baoying (陳寶應), who controlled modern Fujian. In spring 563, Zhou Di's forces collapsed, and he fled to Chen Baoying as well. Emperor Wen's forces defeated them by 565. Chen Geng had eliminated separatist forces within the empire and reformed the former Liang's policies, making the dynasty more stable. Over time, the economy of major cities was restored.

Emperor Wen honored Empress Zhang as empress dowager. He created his wife Princess Shen Miaorong empress and her son Chen Bozong crown prince. As he inherited the throne from Emperor Wu, he did not posthumously honor his father Chen Daotan as an emperor as might otherwise have been expected, but, in order to make sure that his father would be properly venerated (which would require Chen Daotan's legal heir—Emperor Wen's brother Chen Xu—to be present to offer sacrifices to him), he created his own son Chen Bomao (陳伯茂) the Prince of Shixing instead, and created Chen Xu, who was then still at Chang'an, the capital of Western Wei's successor state Northern Zhou, the Prince of Ancheng. In 563, Emperor Wen himself began to offer sacrifices to Chen Daotan using ceremonies due to an emperor, but never honored his father as an emperor.

In the Book of Chen, the historian Yao Silian wrote about Emperor Wen (referring to Emperor Wen by his temple name Shizu):

Shizu [Emperor Wen] grew up in difficult times, and he knew much about the people's suffering. He was observant of things and frugal in his lifestyle. Ever night, he would order his servants to open the door to his sleeping quarters, to bring in the emergency submissions so that he could review them. He also ordered that his guards, whenever they were to change shifts, should throw their shift plates on the stone steps so that they would be loud enough to wake him.

Emperor Wen further solidified and unified the territory of Chen, helping the economy recover and flourish.

=== Emperor Chen Bozong ===
Emperor Wen was succeeded by Chen Bozong (Emperor Fei), who was then succeeded by Chen Xu (Emperor Xuan). Both Chen Bozong and Chen Xu were also very effective and capable rulers who further strengthened and expanded the state, rivaling and even defeating the Northern Zhou and Northern Qi.

In the ninth year of Taijian (太建 577), Northern Zhou dynasty destroyed Northern Qi. In the following year, Chen and Zhou launched a fierce battle in Luliang, Chen defeated the Zhou and made further advances north.

Chen Bozong married Empress Wang (Chen dynasty), and they had a son Chen Zhize. During his reign, important matters were also trusted to his uncle Chen Xu, as well as Kong, Dao Zhongju (到仲舉), Yuan Shu (袁樞), and Liu Shizhi (劉師知).

=== Emperor Xuan ===
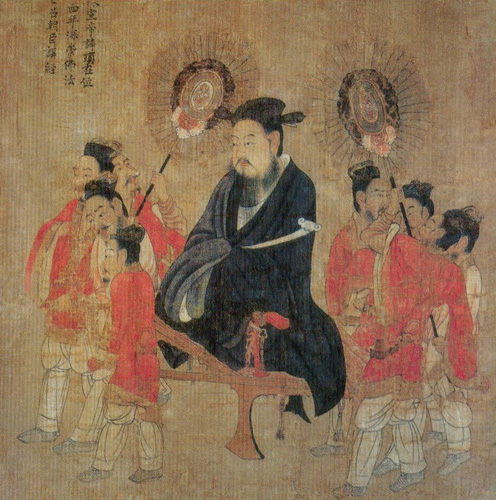
Emperor Xu

Emperor Chen Xu married Liu Jingyan and had a son Chen Shubao. For reasons unclear in history, Chen Xu left the throne empty for more than a month, but finally took the throne in spring 569 (as Emperor Xuan). He honored Grand Empress Dowager Zhang as empress dowager instead, while Emperor Wen's wife Empress Dowager Shen became known as Empress Wen. He created his wife Princess Liu empress and his heir apparent Chen Shubao crown emperor. Emperor Wen's sons continued to have honored positions as imperial princes and held key posts, but none had particularly high power.

In fall 569, Emperor Xuan, suspicious that Ouyang He (歐陽紇) the governor of Guang Province (廣州 Guangzhou, Guangdong) would rebel, summoned Ouyang back to Jiankang. Ouyang was himself suspicious of Emperor Xuan's intentions, and therefore refused the order and rebelled. Emperor Xuan sent the official Xu Jian (徐儉, Xu Ling's son) to try to persuade Ouyang to change his mind, but Ouyang would not relent. Emperor Xuan then sent the general Zhang Zhaoda to attack Ouyang. By spring 570, Zhang captured Ouyang and delivered him to Jiankang, where Ouyang was beheaded. Zhang, encouraged by the victory, then attacked Western Liang's capital Jiangling, but after some initial gains, nearly capturing Jiangling, he suffered defeats by the Northern Zhou general Lu Teng (陸騰) and withdrew. Despite this campaign, after this point on, Chen and Northern Zhou largely had peaceful relations, often exchanging embassies, forming an alliance against Northern Qi.

In spring 573, Emperor Xuan resolved to attack Northern Qi. Emperor Xuan, at the suggestion of Xu Ling, selected Wu Mingche, who alone among the generals was resolute as to his support for the campaign, as the commander of the forces, with Pei Ji (裴忌) and Huang Faqu as Wu's deputies. Wu's forces made quick gains against Northern Qi, and by summer 573 had gained most of the territory between the Yangtze River and the Huai River. By fall 573, Wu put the important city Shouyang (壽陽, Chen Lu'an, Anhui) under siege, and he captured Shouyang in 573, capturing and killing the Northern Qi general in charge of defending the city, the former Liang general Wang Lin. The entire region between the Yangtze and Huai was now in Chen hands. Emperor Xuan was so pleased that he, in an elaborate ceremony, conferred a variety of honors on Wu. He also displayed Wang's head on the Jiankang city gate, although after a request by Zhu Yang (朱瑒), in which Zhu pointed out that Wang was faithful to Liang and should be honored, he returned Wang's head for a proper burial. In the following years, Chen continued to make minor gains against Northern Qi, but was not making major attacks.

In winter 576, Emperor Wu of Northern Zhou launched a major attack on Northern Qi, quickly capturing, in succession, Northern Qi's secondary capital Jinyang (晉陽, Chen Taiyuan, Shanxi) and capital Yecheng. Soon, he captured the Northern Qi emperor Gao Wei and annexed most of Northern Qi's territory by spring 577.

Oddly enough, Emperor Xuan believed that he could seize part of Northern Qi territory after Northern Zhou's victory, and he sent Wu Mingche to again advance north. In winter 577, Wu put Pengcheng (彭城, Chen Xuzhou, Jiangsu) under siege, and Emperor Xuan was confident that Wu would soon be able to capture the region south of the Yellow River. When the official Cai Jingli (蔡景歷) warned otherwise, he was so displeased that he demoted Cai to the post of a commandery governor. In spring 578, the Northern Zhou general Wang Gui (王軌) thoroughly crushed Wu, capturing him. Regretting his actions, Emperor Xuan recalled Cai to the capital. With the people's hearts shaken by the great defeat, in fall 578, Emperor Xuan held a ceremony in which the officials reaffirmed their loyalty to the state.

In winter 579, Emperor Xuan of Northern Zhou launched an attack on Chen, commanded by the general Wei Xiaokuan. Chen's Emperor Xuan mobilized his troops to resist. However, all of the cities that they had captured from Northern Qi previously quickly fell. By new year 580, nearly all of the territory north of the Yangtze had fallen to Northern Zhou, leading to a large wave of refugees who fled across the Yangtze to Chen territory.

In summer 580, Northern Zhou's Emperor Xuan died suddenly, and his father-in-law Yang Jian seized power as regent. The generals Yuchi Jiong rose against Yang, and he was joined by the generals Sima Xiaonan (司馬消難) and Wang Qian (王謙). Sima, the governor of Xun Province (勛州, Chen Xiaogan, Hubei) and the nine surrounding provinces, soon surrendered to Chen, seeking Chen aid. Emperor Xuan sent the generals Fan Yi (樊毅), Ren Zhong (任忠), and Chen Huiji (陳慧紀) to attack Northern Zhou's southern provinces to aid Sima, whom he created the Duke of Sui. However, Wei Xiaokuan quickly defeated Yuchi, forcing Yuchi to commit suicide, and Sima's own forces collapsed. He was forced to flee to Chen territory, and all of the territory he controlled was retained by Northern Zhou. Yang Jian soon seized the throne in spring 581, destroying the Northern Zhou and establishing the Sui dynasty.

In spring 582, Emperor Xuan died. After a failed attempt by his son Chen Shuling (陳叔陵), allied with Emperor Wen's son Chen Bogu (陳伯固), to seize the throne, Crown Prince Shubao took the throne.

=== Last emperor: Chen Shubao ===
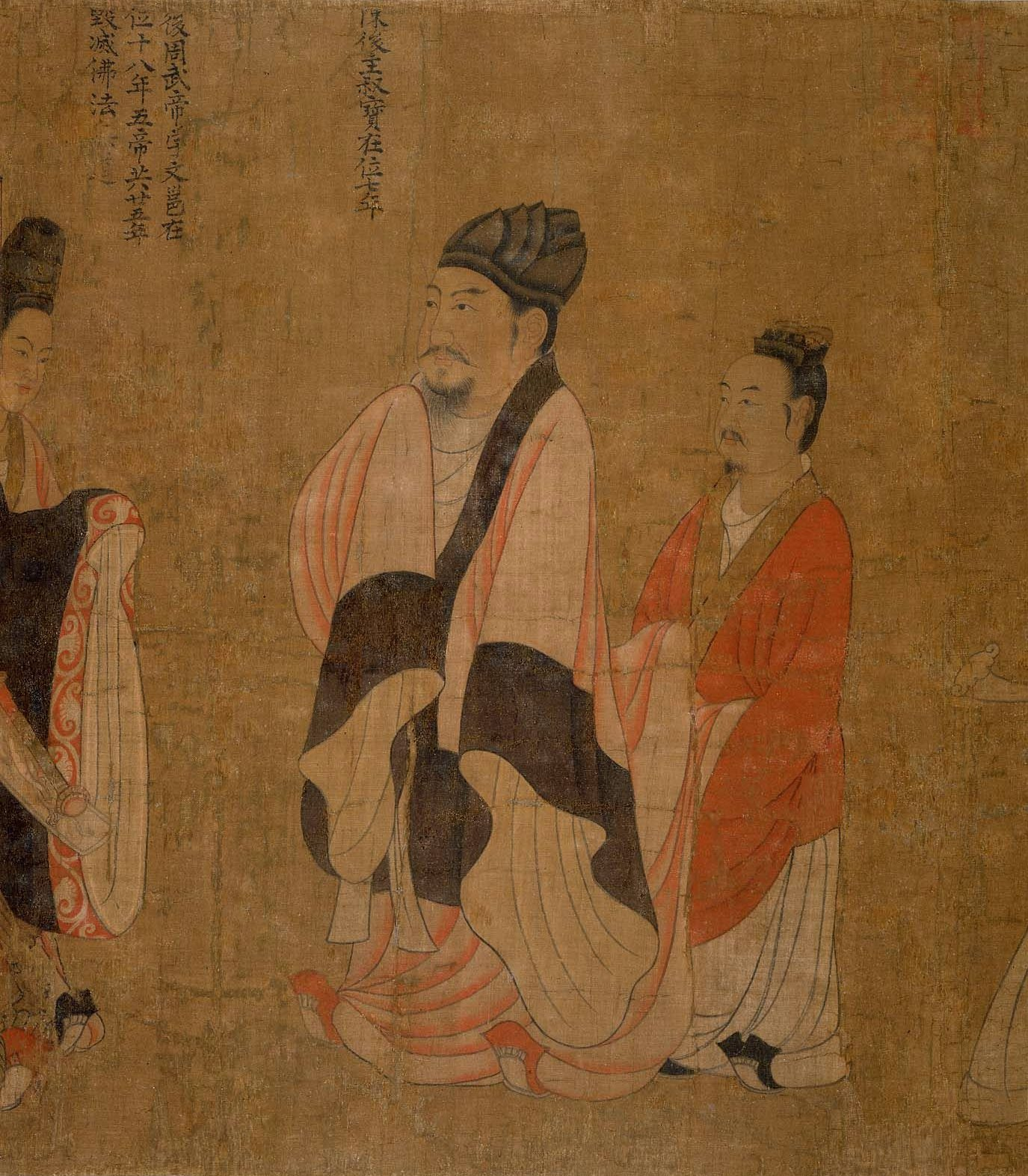
Emperor Shubao

Initially, Chen Shubao was still recovering from his injuries, and Empress Dowager Liu governed as regent, assisted by Chen Shujian. As Chen Shubao did not favor Empress Shen, she was not allowed to attend to him during his recovery period. Rather, Consort Zhang did. After Chen Shubao recovered, Empress Dowager Liu returned imperial authorities to him and did not again govern.

When Emperor Xuan died, Northern Zhou's successor state, the Sui dynasty, had been attacking, but upon hearing about Emperor Xuan's death, Emperor Wen of Sui (Yang Jian) decided that it was improper to attack a state that had just lost its emperor and withdrew his forces. He also sent ambassadors to mourn Emperor Xuan's death, and his letter to Chen Shubao referred to himself by his personal name—a sign of humility. Chen Shubao's return letter included the sentence, "May it be that when you govern your state, all things can be well, and that between heaven and earth, there will be peace and quiet." The states exchanged ambassadors often and generally had peaceful relations, although Sui's Emperor Wen was gradually building up military power on the Yangtze.

In spring 583, displeased that Chen Shujian was becoming overly powerful, Chen Shubao, encouraged by his associates Kong Fan (孔範) and Shi Wenqing (施文慶), made Chen Shujian the governor of Jiang Province (江州, Chen Jiujiang, Jiangxi) to remove him from power. He subsequently kept Chen Shujian at the capital by promoting him to the honorary post of Sikong (司空). Meanwhile, despite the fact that Chen Shubao was still supposed to be in mourning period for Emperor Xuan, he was spending much time in feasting. When the official Mao Xi (毛喜) tried to persuade him to change his ways, Chen Shubao demoted Mao and sent him out of the capital.

Around the new year 584, Chen Shujian, prayed that he would be restored to grace. When this was discovered, Chen Shubao considered executing Chen Shujian, but after Chen Shujian reminded him how Chen Shujian was responsible for saving him from Chen Shuling, Chen Shubao spared him but removed him from his posts.

In 584, Chen Shubao built three particularly luxurious pavilions within his palace—Linchun Pavilion (臨春閣), Jieqi Pavilion (結綺閣), and Wangxian Pavilion (望仙閣), residing himself at Linchun Pavilion, while having Consort Zhang reside at Jieqi Pavilion and Consorts Gong and Kong share Wangxian Pavilion. He often spent his days feasting with his concubines, headed by Consort Zhang, as well as those ladies in waiting and officials who had literary talent (including Jiang Zong, whom he made prime minister, Kong Fan, and Wang Cuo 王瑳), having those officials and ladies in waiting sing or write poetry to praise his concubines' beauty. Two of the particularly known songs, Yushu Houting Hua (玉樹後庭花) and Linchun Yue (臨春樂), were written to praise the beauties of Consorts Zhang and Kong.

Chen Shubao would often hold Consort Zhang on his lap and have Consort Zhang, who was considered intelligent, read and rule on the petitions submitted to him. Meanwhile, Consort Kong and Kong Fan, who were not related, began to refer to each other as sister and brother, and used their relationship to further their power as well, so Consorts Zhang and Kong became exceedingly powerful. To finance Chen Shubao's construction projects, taxes were raised, and soldiers and the officials, who were previously immune to taxes, were also required to pay them, causing general discontent from those classes. Further, at Kong Fan's urging, Chen Shubao transferred much of the military command to civilian officials, further causing the generals to be disgruntled.

In spring 585, Zhang Dabao (章大寶) the governor of Feng Province (豐州, Chen Fuzhou, Fujian), accused of corruption and on the verge of being replaced by Li Yun (李暈), instead ambushed Li and killed him, starting a rebellion. However, Zhang was soon defeated and killed.

In fall 587, while Emperor Jing of Western Liang was at the Sui capital to meet with Sui's Emperor Wen, the Western Liang officials Xiao Yan (蕭巖, Emperor Jing's uncle) and Xiao Huan (蕭瓛, Emperor Jing's brother), in fear that the Sui general Cui Hongdu (崔弘度) was actually intending to attack the Western Liang capital Jiangling, surrendered to Chen Shubao's cousin Chen Huiji (陳慧紀) the Marquess of Yihuang with the people of Jiangling. Chen Shubao accepted the surrender and made Xiao Yan and Xiao Huan provincial governors.

In spring 588, Chen Shubao, believing Consorts Zhang's and Kong's accusations that Chen Yin resented him for not favoring Empress Shen, deposed Chen Yin and created him the Prince of Wuxing, instead creating Consort Zhang's son Chen Yuan crown prince. He also considered deposing Empress Shen and replacing her with Consort Zhang, but did not get a chance to do so before Sui launched a major attack in spring 588 as well. By winter 588, the Sui attack was in full operation, with three major prongs commanded by Emperor Wen's sons, Yang Guang (later Emperor Yang of Sui) and Yang Jun, and Yang Su, and with Yang Guang in overall command of the operation, assisted by Gao Jiong. Reports from the upper Yangtze, however, were being suppressed by Shi Wenqing and Shen Keqing (沈客卿) and never reached Chen Shubao, as Shi, not realizing the seriousness of the Sui threat, did not want anything to interfere with his own plans to become the governor of Xiang Province (湘州, Chen Changsha, Hunan). Yang Su, who attacked from the upper Yangtze, therefore faced no serious opposition and soon controlled the upper Yangtze, not allowing any Chen forces which might have wanted to head downstream to aid the capital to be able to get through.

In spring 589, the Sui general Heruo Bi (賀若弼) crossed the Yangtze from Guangling (廣陵, Chen Yangzhou, Jiangsu), and the Sui general Han Qinhu (韓擒虎) crossed the Yangtze at Caishi (采石, Chen Ma'anshan, Anhui), without opposition from Chen forces and sandwiching the Chen capital Jiankang. Only then did Chen Shubao realize the seriousness of the situation, but instead of resisting in earnest, he panicked, leaving Shi in effective control of the situation. Eventually, the general Xiao Mohe convinced Chen Shubao that he should be allowed to engage Heruo, despite opposition from the general Ren Zhong (任忠). Heruo defeated Xiao Mohe and captured him, and the rest of Chen troops collapsed, allowing the Sui forces to enter the capital. In panic and abandoned by his officials, Chen Shubao hid in a well with Consorts Zhang and Kong, but was discovered and captured. When he was brought before Heruo Bi, he was so fearful that he prostrated himself before Heruo Bi, act that brought words of contempt from Heruo. However, he and his household were generally treated well by the Sui generals, although Gao, blaming Consort Zhang for Chen's collapse, executed her. Some of the Chen generals continued to resist, but were quickly defeated, particularly because at the Sui forces' request, Chen Shubao wrote letters to the Chen generals ordering them to surrender. Chen was at its end. Soon, the Sui army escorted Chen Shubao and his household to the Sui capital Daxing (大興, near Chang'an).

=== Sui-Tang dynasties ===
In the north, a new power emerged, the Sui dynasty. The Sui destroyed the Northern Zhou and eventually absorbed the Chen dynasty in 589. Chen Shubao was the last ruler of the Chen dynasty, and his family held high positions in the Sui royal court. The Sui was an important dynasty for subjugating the East Tujue, Tuyuhun, and Goguryeo to the north and east as well as starting the Grand Canal project, much of which was based in Chen dynasty territory. Many members of the Chen royal family became high-ranking officers or married into the Yang ruling family of the Sui dynasty, such as Consort Chen (Wen).

The Sui also suppressed the Rau peoples to the south, who had resumed raids against the region of Jiaozhi (Vietnam). From 590 to 618, the short-lived Sui dynasty experienced numerous rebellions, not just from the former Chen territory, but also the Wang, Liu, and Li clans. Sui general Yang Su tried to suppress the rebellions in the early 590s, but eventually the Sui collapsed, and Yang Su's sons were executed. Li Yuan then murdered the last emperor Yang You of the Sui dynasty and founded the Tang dynasty.

During the Tang, numerous members of the former Chen family became high-ranked officials in the Tang court, with some like Chen Shuda holding powerful political offices.

== Culture ==
Jiankang, the capital, was an important cultural, political and religious center, attracting businessmen and Buddhist monks from Southeast Asia and India. The culture of the Southern dynasties reached their apex during the Chen dynasty. In literature, Xu Ling (徐陵) was an influential writer during the Chen dynasty, with his literary collection "New Songs of Yutai" being passed down for generations. One of the most famous chapters from New Songs of Yutai is "Peacock Flying Southeast" (《孔雀东南飞》). In art, Yao Zui's (姚最) "Continued Paintings" has the greatest influence.

Once Chen Baxian became emperor he immediately took steps to officially sanction Buddhism, as he displayed a relic believed to be a Buddha's tooth and held a major Buddhist festival. He also, following the lead of Liang's Emperor Wu, offered himself to Buddha's service on one occasion. He made several requests to Western Wei's successor state Northern Zhou to return Chen Chang and Chen Xu, and while Northern Zhou promised to do so, they would actually not be returned in Emperor Wu's lifetime.

Chen dynasty emperors including Chen Baxian claimed descent from the legendary Emperor Shun.

== Emperors of Chen dynasty (557–589) ==
Posthumous name	Personal name	Period of reigns	Era names	Empress
Emperor Wu of Chen	Chen Baxian	557–559	Yongding (永定) 557–559	Consort Zhang Yao'er
Emperor Wen of Chen	Chen Qian	559–566	Tianjia (天嘉) 560–566; Tiankang (天康) 566	
–	Chen Bozong	566–568	Guangda (光大) 566–568	
Emperor Xuan of Chen	Chen Xu	569–582	Taijian (太建) 569–582	Liu Jingyan
–	Chen Shubao	583–589	Zhide (至德) 583–586; Zhenming (禎明) 587–589	

== Family tree ==
Chen dynasty emperors family tree

Chen Wenzan 陈文赞
Chen Daotan 陈道谭	Chen Baxian 陳霸先 (503–559); Wu (r. 557–559)
Chen Qian 陳蒨 (522–566); Wen (r. 559–566)	Chen Xu 陈顼 (530–582); Xuan (r. 569–582)	Chen Chang 陳昌 (537–560)
Chen Bozong 陳伯宗 (554?–570); Fei (r. 566–568)	Chen Shubao 陈叔宝; 553–604; r. 582–589	Chen Shuda 陳叔達 d.635	Ningyuan 寧遠公主 577–605	Emperor Wen of Sui
Chen Yin 陳胤 b.573	Chen Yuan 陳渊 b.575

== Marriage ==
More than fifty percent of Tuoba Xianbei princesses of the Northern Wei were married to southern Han Chinese men from the imperial families and aristocrats from southern China of the Southern dynasties who defected and moved north to join the Northern Wei. Tuoba Xianbei Princess Nanyang (南阳长公主) was married to Xiao Baoyin (萧宝夤), a Han Chinese member of Southern Qi royalty.

== Notable descendants ==
- The ancestors of the Ho dynasty of Vietnam claim descent from the Chen dynasty, as well as the Chen (state)

== Gallery ==
Chen dynasty pictures

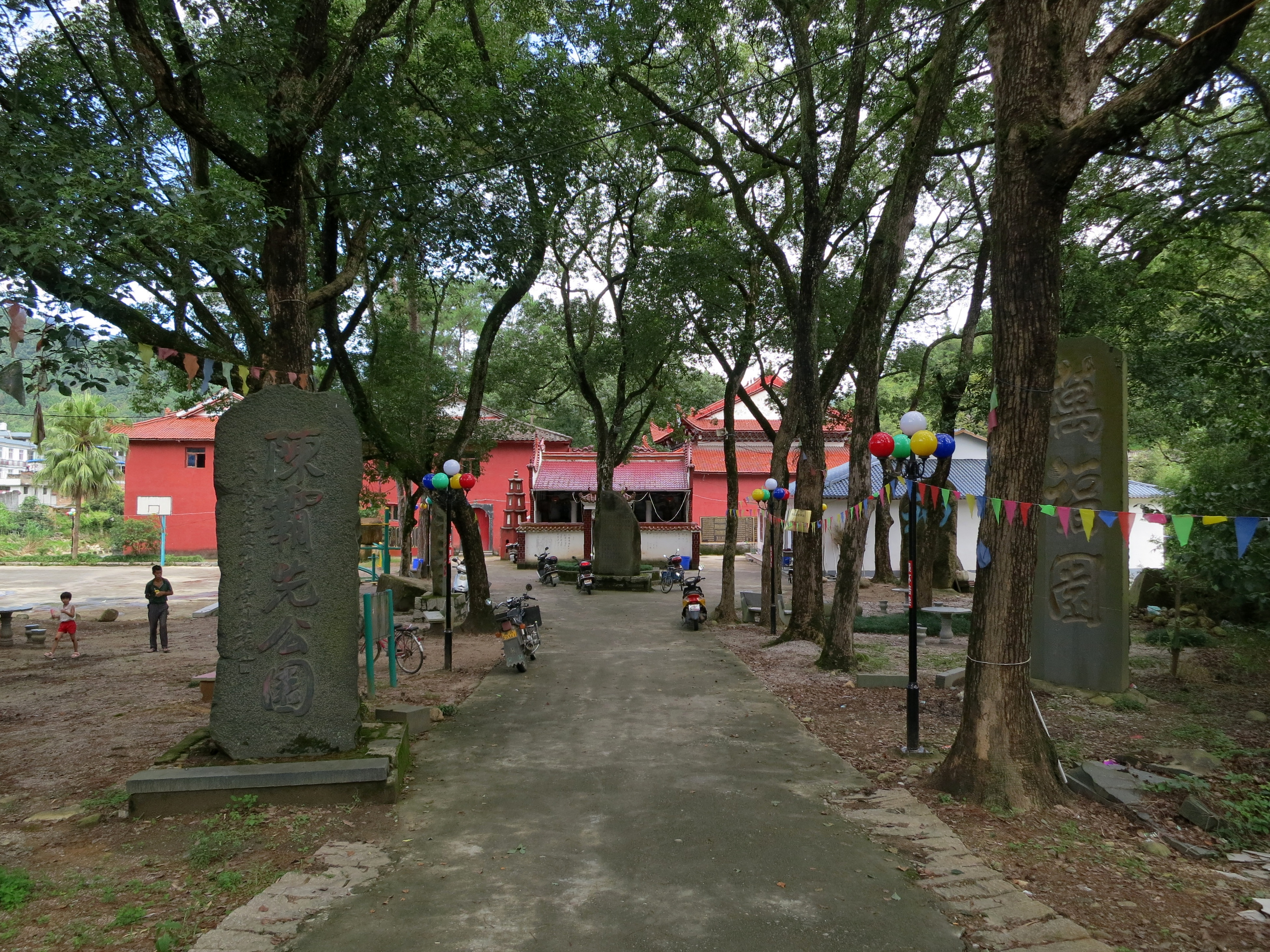
Park named in honor of the founding emperor Chen Baxian

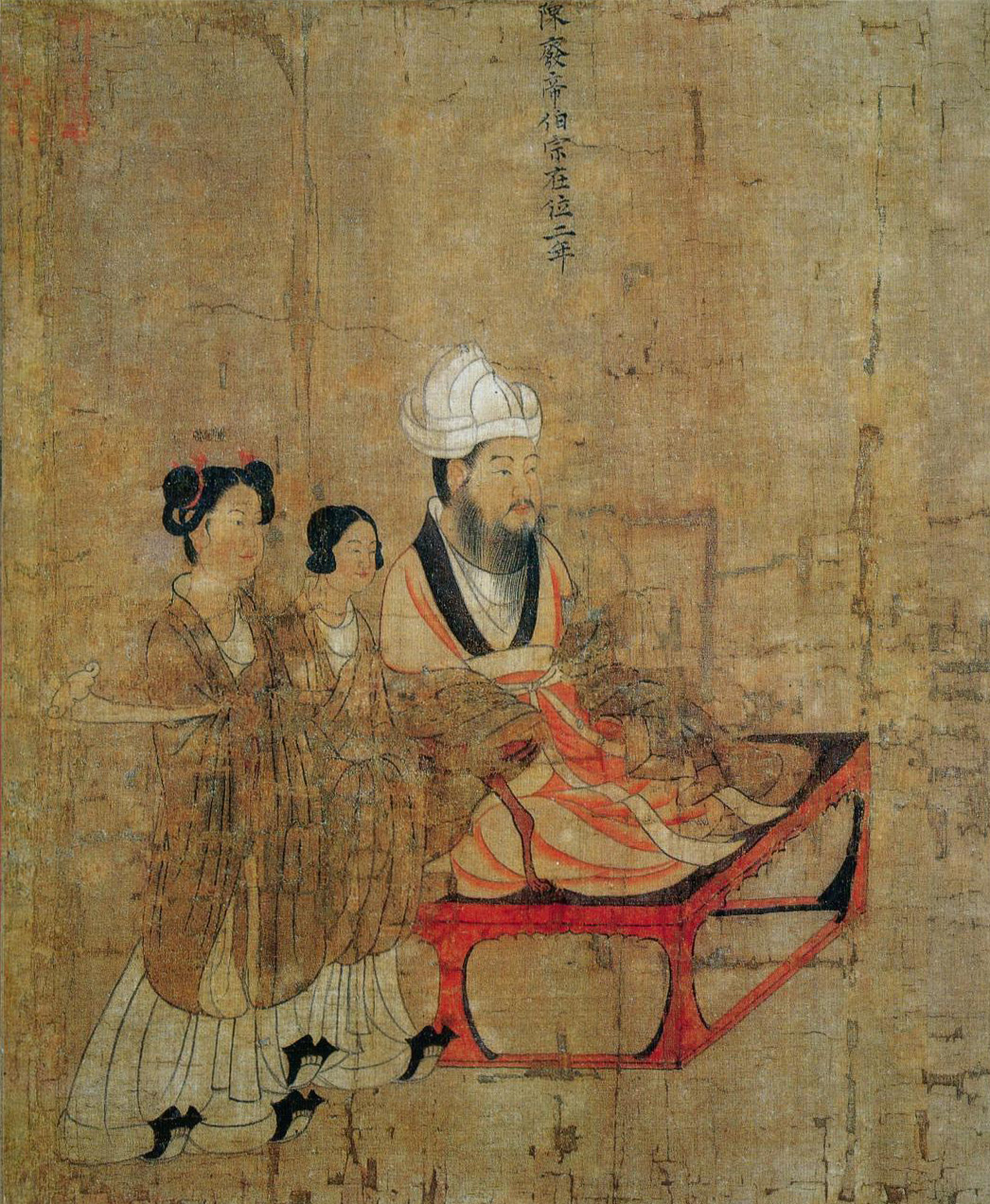
Chen Bozong

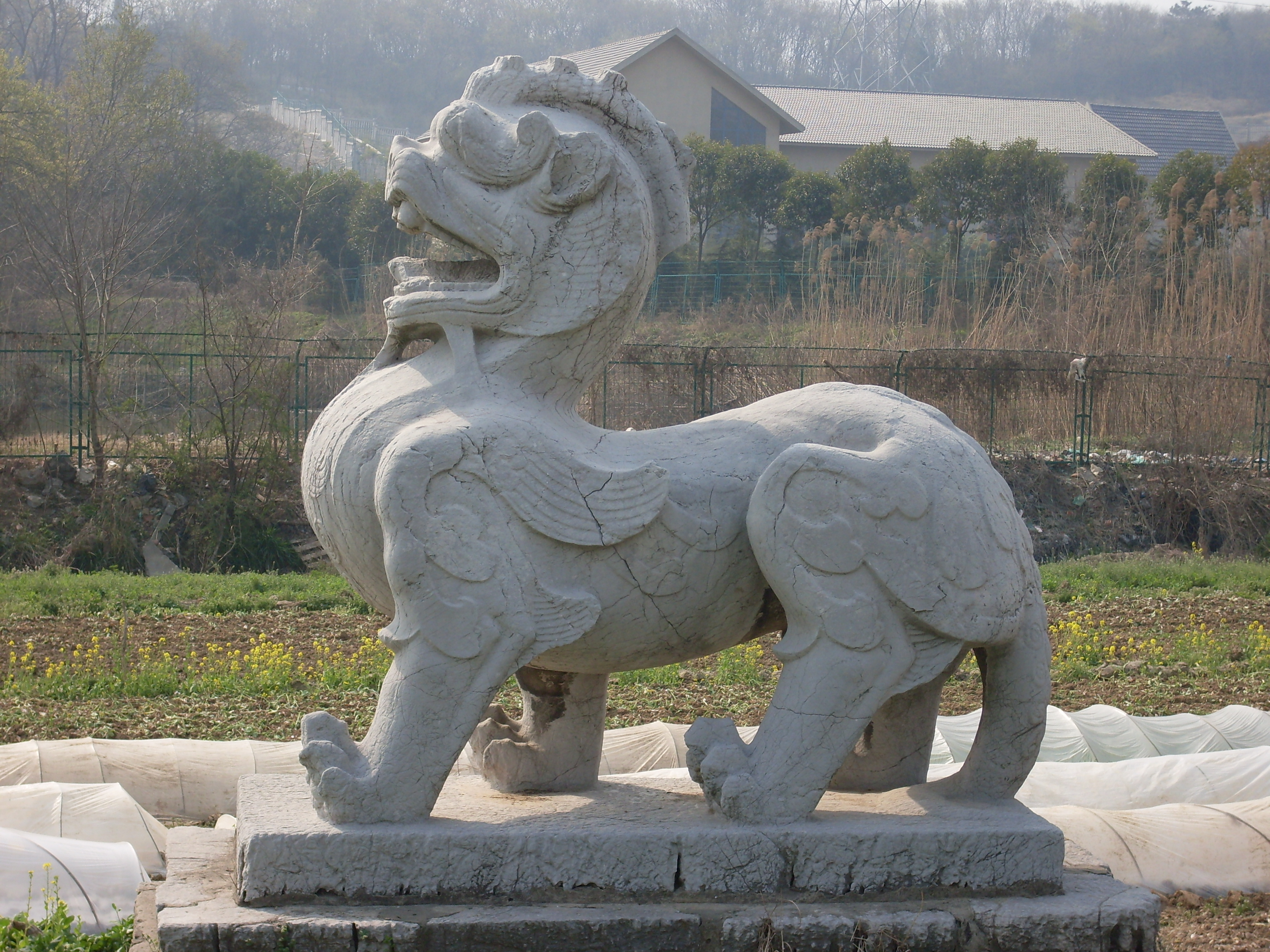
A pixiu from the Yongning Tomb of Emperor Wen of Chen (ca. 566). Qixia District

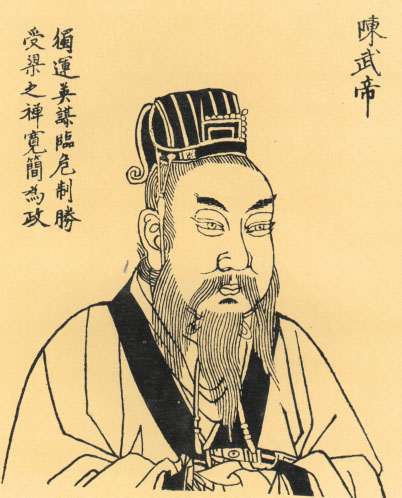
Emperor Wu of Chen

== See also ==
- Chen (state), Zhou dynasty
- Trần dynasty, Vietnam golden age
- Chen Han
- Sui dynasty, a brief successor state
- Tang dynasty, succeeded the Sui
- History of Northern Dynasties
- History of Southern Dynasties
- Zizhi Tongjian
