= Emperor Xuan of Chen =

Emperor of the Chen dynasty from 569 to 582

Emperor Xuan of Chen 陳宣帝
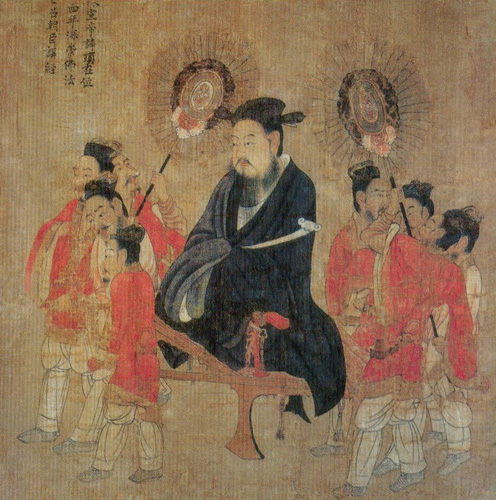
- Tang dynasty portrait of Emperor Xuan by Yan Liben

Emperor of the Chen dynasty
- Reign: 5 February 569 – 17 February 582
- Predecessor: Emperor Fei
- Successor: Emperor Houzhu
- Born: Chen Shili (陳師利); 530
- Died: 582 (aged 51–52)
- Burial: Xianning Mausoleum (顯寧陵, in present-day Yuhuatai District, Nanjing)
- Consorts: Lady Qian; Lady Liu of Hedong
Names
- Family name: Chen (陳); Given name: Xu (頊); Courtesy name: Shaoshi (紹世); Childhood name: Shili (師利)
Era name and dates
- Tàijiàn (太建): 569–582
Posthumous name
- Emperor Xiaoxuan (孝宣皇帝)
Temple name
- Gaozong (高宗)
- Dynasty: Chen dynasty
- Father: Chen Daotan

Emperor Xuan of Chen (陳宣帝) (530 – 17 February 582), personal name Chen Xu (陳頊), also called Chen Tanxu (陳曇頊), courtesy name Shaoshi (紹世), childhood name Shili (師利), was the fourth emperor of the Chen dynasty of China. He seized the throne from his nephew Emperor Fei in 569 and subsequently ruled the state for 13 years. He was considered to be a capable and diligent ruler, who at one point militarily expanded at the expense of the Northern Qi. After the Northern Qi fell to the Northern Zhou in 577, however, the Chen dynasty was cornered, and soon lost the gains it had previously made against Northern Qi. Emperor Xuan died in 582, leaving the state in the hands of his incompetent son Chen Shubao, and by 589, the Chen dynasty would be destroyed by Northern Zhou's successor state Sui dynasty.

== Background ==
Chen Xu was born in 530, as the second son of Chen Daotan (陳道譚), a commander in the Liang dynasty palace guards. His mother's name is not recorded in history. Chen Daotan died in 548 or 549, while commanding the guards in resisting a siege of the palace at the capital Jiankang by the rebel general Hou Jing. After the palace fell to Hou in 549, Chen Xu's older brother Chen Qian and cousin Chen Chang were imprisoned by Hou, because Chen Chang's father, the general Chen Baxian, had joined forces with Wang Sengbian, a general under the command of Xiao Yi the Prince of Xiangdong in resisting Hou. It is unclear whether Chen Xu was imprisoned as well. In 551, Wang, with Chen's assistance, defeated Hou and recaptured Jiankang. Xiao Yi subsequently declared himself emperor (as Emperor Yuan), but set up his capital at Jiangling (江陵, in modern Jingzhou, Hubei) rather than returning to Jiankang, which he put under the command of Wang. As part of this alignment, Chen Baxian was given the post of defending Jingkou (京口, in modern Zhenjiang, Jiangsu). Emperor Yuan then summoned Chen Chang and Chen Xu to Jiangling to serve in his administration—and also to serve as hostages. Both were given mid-level positions. He also gave Chen Xu a wife—his niece Liu Jingyan. (Chen Xu had previously married a wife, Lady Qian, while he was at his home commandery of Yixing (義興, roughly modern Huzhou, Zhejiang), but Lady Qian did not accompany him to Jiangling)

In 554, rival Western Wei attacked Jiangling and captured it, executing Emperor Yuan around the new year 555. Chen Xu and Chen Chang were taken to the Western Wei capital Chang'an as honored captives, while Lady Liu and their son Chen Shubao were left at Rangcheng (穰城, in modern Nanyang, Henan). Wang and Chen Baxian initially wanted to make Emperor Yuan's son Xiao Fangzhi the Prince of Jin'an emperor, but after military pressure from Northern Qi, in summer 555, Wang agreed to make Northern Qi's favored candidate Xiao Yuanming (Emperor Yuan's cousin) emperor instead—a decision that Chen disagreed with. In fall 555, he made a surprise attack on Jiankang, killing Wang and deposing Xiao Yuanming, making Xiao Fangzhi emperor instead (as Emperor Jing). In 557, he had Emperor Jing yield the throne to him, establishing the Chen dynasty as its Emperor Wu. Chen Xu's brother Chen Qian was created the Prince of Linchuan, and while Chen Xu was still then detained by Western Wei, Emperor Wu remotely created him the Prince of Shixing, to inherit the title that Emperor Wu posthumously created his father Chen Daotan.

Emperor Wu died in 559, and because Chen Chang was still detained at Chang'an as well, Chen Qian took the throne (as Emperor Wen). Because Chen Xu was not available to offer sacrifices to their father Chen Daotan, Emperor Wen created his own son Chen Bomao (陳伯茂) the Prince of Shixing instead, changing (remotely) Chen Xu's title to Prince of Ancheng. In 560, Western Wei's successor state Northern Zhou began to make overtures to Chen, offering to return Chen Xu. In 562, after Emperor Wen gave Northern Zhou the city of Lushan (魯山, in modern Wuhan, Hubei) in exchange, Chen Xu was allowed to return to Chen. Initially, Princess Liu and Chen Shubao were not returned, but after further negotiations by Emperor Wen, they were returned as well. (Chen Xu also welcomed his first wife Lady Qian to his mansion, but as Princess Liu was of an honored birth as the daughter of a Liang princess, she retained the position of his wife, although she gave due respect to Lady Qian)

== During Emperor Wen's reign ==
Chen Xu quickly became one of his brother Emperor Wen's key subordinates. For example, in spring 562, when the warlord Zhou Di (周迪) rebelled, Emperor Wen initially sent the general Wu Mingche against Zhou, but when Wu was unable to defeat Zhou, Emperor Wen sent Chen Xu to replace Wu. Over the next few years, Chen Xu continued to be promoted, although he was temporary relieved of several of his posts in 565, when his associate Bao Sengrui (鮑僧叡), in reliance of their close relationship, was acting inappropriately, and was accused of such impropriety by the official Xu Ling (徐陵).

In spring 566, Emperor Wen was seriously ill, and Chen Xu, along with the other key officials Dao Zhongju (到仲舉), Kong Huan (孔奐), Yuan Shu (袁樞), and Liu Shizhi (劉師之), attended to him. As Emperor Wen believed his crown prince Chen Bozong to be weak in personality, he offered to pass the throne to Chen Xu, but Chen Xu, weeping bitterly, declined, and the move was also opposed by Dao and Kong, and Emperor Wen did not alter his succession order. Emperor Wen died soon thereafter, and Chen Bozong took the throne as Emperor Fei.

== During Emperor Fei's reign ==
Although Emperor Fei was emperor, the power was split between Chen Xu, Dao Zhongju, and Liu Shizhi, and all three lived inside the palace in order to handle sensitive matters. Liu, fearful of Chen Xu's honored status as the emperor's uncle, soon planned to exclude Chen Xu. He had the official Yin Buning (殷不佞) informing Chen Xu that he should leave the palace to attend to the matters of the capital region Yang Province (揚州), of which Chen Xu was also governor. When Chen Xu considered doing so, his associate Mao Xi (毛喜) and the general Wu Mingche persuaded him that he needed to remain in the palace. Chen Xu therefore invited Liu to a meeting—and while the meeting was still going on, had Mao confirming with Emperor Wen's wife Empress Dowager Shen Miaorong and Emperor Fei that it was not their order that he leave the palace. Once Mao confirmed so, Chen Xu arrested Liu and ordered him to commit suicide, while demoting Dao to a lesser position. From this point on, the administration was controlled by Chen Xu.

Fearful of what would come next, Dao and the general Han Zigao (韓子高) considered actions against Chen Xu, but before they could take any actions against Chen Xu, their plot was reported to Chen Xu, and Chen Xu arrested them and then had Emperor Fei issue an edict ordering them to commit suicide. Emperor Fei's brother Chen Bomao (陳伯茂) the Prince of Shixing, whom Chen Xu believed to have participated in both Liu's and Dao and Han's plots, was stripped of his governmental posts and ordered to keep Emperor Fei company.

The deaths of Liu and Han, both of whom were close associates of Emperor Wen, brought fear into the heart of another associate of Emperor Wen—Hua Jiao (華皎) the governor of Xiang Province (湘州, modern central Hunan). In summer 567, Hua therefore submitted himself to Northern Zhou and Northern Zhou's vassal state, Western Liang. Chen Xu sent Wu and Chunyu Liang (淳于量) to lead a fleet against the joint forces of Hua, Northern Zhou, and Western Liang. The opposing sides met at Dunkou (沌口, in modern Wuhan, Hubei). Wu and Chunyu were able to ram Hua's, Northern Zhou's, and Western Liang's fleets, causing them to collapse. Both Hua and the Northern Zhou general Yuwen Zhi (宇文直) the Duke of Wei fled to Western Liang's capital Jiangling, while the Northern Zhou general Yuan Ding (元定) were captured. Wu followed up by putting Jiangling under siege in spring 568, but was not able to capture it and subsequently forced to withdraw.

Meanwhile, Chen Xu was receiving greater formal titles and authorities. Chen Bomao, angry over the situation, was making repeated denigrations of Chen Xu, who then resolved to take the throne himself. In winter 568, Chen Xu had an edict issued in the name of Emperor Wu's wife Grand Empress Dowager Zhang Yao'er, falsely accusing Emperor Fei of having been part of the plots of Liu and Hua. The edict further stated that Emperor Wen had already known that Emperor Fei was unsuitable, and that Emperor Wen's stated desire to have Chen Xu take the throne should be carried out. Emperor Fei was deposed and demoted to the title of Prince of Linhai, while Chen Bomao was demoted to Marquess of Wenma and subsequently assassinated.

== Early reign ==
For reasons unclear in history, Chen Xu left the throne empty for more than a month, but finally took the throne in spring 569 (as Emperor Xuan). He honored Grand Empress Dowager Zhang as empress dowager instead, while Emperor Wen's wife Empress Dowager Shen became known as Empress Wen. He created his wife Princess Liu empress and his heir apparent Chen Shubao crown emperor. Emperor Wen's sons continued to have honored positions as imperial princes and held key posts, but none had particularly high power.

In fall 569, Emperor Xuan, suspicious that Ouyang He (歐陽紇) the governor of Guang Province (廣州, roughly modern Guangzhou, Guangdong) would rebel, summoned Ouyang back to Jiankang. Ouyang was himself suspicious of Emperor Xuan's intentions, and therefore refused the order and rebelled. Emperor Xuan sent the official Xu Jian (徐儉, Xu Ling's son) to try to persuade Ouyang to change his mind, but Ouyang would not relent. Emperor Xuan then sent the general Zhang Zhaoda to attack Ouyang. By spring 570, Zhang captured Ouyang and delivered him to Jiankang, where Ouyang was beheaded. Zhang, encouraged by the victory, then attacked Western Liang's capital Jiangling, but after some initial gains, nearly capturing Jiangling, he suffered defeats by the Northern Zhou general Lu Teng (陸騰) and withdrew. Despite this campaign, however, after this point on, Chen and Northern Zhou largely had peaceful relations, often exchanging embassies, forming a rough alliance against Northern Qi.

In spring 573, Emperor Xuan resolved to attack Northern Qi—but when he discussed the matter with his officials and generals, they had split of opinion. Emperor Xuan, at the suggestion of Xu Ling, selected Wu Mingche, who alone among the generals was resolute as to his support for the campaign, as the commander of the forces, with Pei Ji (裴忌) and Huang Faqu (name not in Unicode) as Wu's deputies. Wu's forces made quick gains against Northern Qi, and by summer 573 had gained most of the territory between the Yangtze River and the Huai River. By fall 573, Wu put the important city Shouyang (壽陽, in modern Lu'an, Anhui) under siege, and he captured Shouyang in 573, capturing and killing the Northern Qi general in charge of defending the city, the former Liang general Wang Lin. The entire region between the Yangtze and Huai were now in Chen hands. Emperor Xuan was so pleased that he, in an elaborate ceremony, conferred a variety of honors on Wu. He also displayed Wang's head on the Jiankang city gate, although after a request by Zhu Yang (朱瑒), in which Zhu pointed out that Wang was faithful to Liang and should be honored, he returned Wang's head for a proper burial. In the following years, Chen continued to make minor gains against Northern Qi, but was not making major attacks.

== Late reign ==
In winter 576, Emperor Wu of Northern Zhou launched a major attack on Northern Qi, quickly capturing, in succession, Northern Qi's secondary capital Jinyang (晉陽, in modern Taiyuan, Shanxi) and capital Yecheng. Soon, he captured the Northern Qi emperor Gao Wei and annexed most of Northern Qi's territory by spring 577.

Oddly enough, Emperor Xuan believed that he could seize part of Northern Qi territory after Northern Zhou's victory, and he sent Wu Mingche to again advance north. In winter 577, Wu put Pengcheng (彭城, in modern Xuzhou, Jiangsu) under siege, and Emperor Xuan was confident that Wu would soon be able to capture the region south of the Yellow River. When the official Cai Jingli (蔡景歷) warned otherwise, he was so displeased that he demoted Cai to the post of a commandery governor. In spring 578, the Northern Zhou general Wang Gui (王軌) thoroughly crushed Wu, capturing him. Regretting his actions, Emperor Xuan recalled Cai to the capital. With the people's hearts shaken by the great defeat, in fall 578, Emperor Xuan held a ceremony in which the officials reaffirmed their loyalty to the state.

In winter 579, Emperor Xuan of Northern Zhou (Emperor Wu's son and successor) launched an attack on Chen, commanded by the general Wei Xiaokuan. Chen's Emperor Xuan mobilized his troops to resist. However, Chen forces could not stand against Northern Zhou's attacks, and all of the cities that they had captured from Northern Qi previously quickly fell. By new year 580, nearly all of the territory north of the Yangtze had fallen to Northern Zhou, leading to a large wave of refugees who fled across the Yangtze to Chen territory.

In summer 580, Northern Zhou's Emperor Xuan died suddenly, and his father-in-law Yang Jian seized power as regent. The generals Yuchi Jiong rose against Yang, and he was joined by the generals Sima Xiaonan (司馬消難) and Wang Qian (王謙). Sima, the governor of Xun Province (勛州, roughly modern Xiaogan, Hubei) and the nine surrounding provinces, soon surrendered to Chen, seeking Chen aid. Emperor Xuan sent the generals Fan Yi (樊毅), Ren Zhong (任忠), and Chen Huiji (陳慧紀) to attack Northern Zhou's southern provinces to aid Sima, whom he created the Duke of Sui. However, Wei Xiaokuan quickly defeated Yuchi, forcing Yuchi to commit suicide, and Sima's own forces collapsed. He was forced to flee to Chen territory, and all of the territory he controlled was retained by Northern Zhou. (Yang Jian soon seized the throne in spring 581, ending Northern Zhou and establishing the Sui dynasty)

In spring 582, Emperor Xuan died. After a failed attempt by his son Chen Shuling (陳叔陵), allied with Emperor Wen's son Chen Bogu (陳伯固), to seize the throne, Crown Prince Shubao took the throne.

== Family ==
- Guifei, of the Qian clan (貴妃 錢氏)
  - Chen Shuxian, Prince Kangjian of Hedong (河東康簡王 陳叔獻; 568–580), ninth son
- Empress, of the Liu clan of Hedong (皇后 河東柳氏; 533–615)
  - Chen Shubao, Emperor (皇帝 陳叔寶; 553–604), first son
  - Princess Lechang (樂昌公主)
    - Married Xu Deyan of Donghai (東海 徐德言)
- Guiren, of the Peng clan (貴人 彭氏; d. 579)
  - Chen Shuling, Prince of Shixing (始興王 陳叔陵; 554–582), second son
- Shuhua, of the Cao clan (淑華 曹氏)
  - Chen Shuying, Prince of Yuzhang (豫章王 陳叔英), third son
- Shuyi, of the He clan (淑儀 何氏)
  - Chen Shuxian, Prince of Changsha (長沙王 陳叔賢), fourth son
  - Chen Shuming, Prince of Yidu (宜都王 陳叔明; 562–615), sixth son
- Zhaorong, of the Wei clan (昭容 魏氏)
  - Chen Shuqing, Prince of Jian'an (建安王 陳叔卿), fifth son
- Zhaorong, of the Yuan clan (昭容 袁氏)
  - Chen Shuwen, Prince of Jinxi (晉熙王 陳叔文), 12th son
  - Chen Shuda, Prince of Yiyang (義陽王 陳叔達; d. 635), 17th son
  - Chen Shutan, Prince of Xinhui (新會王 陳叔坦), 31st son
- Zhaoyi, of the Liu clan (昭儀 劉氏)
  - Chen Shuqi, Prince of Xincai (新蔡王 陳叔齊; 569–608), 11th son
- Xiuhua, of the Wang clan (修華 王氏)
  - Chen Shuyu, Prince of Wuchang (武昌王 陳叔虞), 19th son
- Xiurong, of the Wei clan (修容 韋氏)
  - Chen Shuping, Prince of Xiangdong (湘東王 陳叔平), 20th son
- Jieyu, of the Shen clan (婕妤 申氏)
  - Chen Shujian, Prince of Nan'an (南安王 陳叔儉), 24th son
  - Chen Shucheng, Prince of Nan (南王 陳叔澄), 25th son
  - Chen Shushao, Prince of Yueshan (嶽山王 陳叔韶), 27th son
  - Chen Shukuang, Prince of Taiyuan (太原王 陳叔匡), 34th son
- Meiren, of the Ceng clan (美人 曾氏)
  - Princess Linchuan (臨川公主), 24th daughter
    - Married Yang Jian (541–604) in 589
- Lady, of the Wang clan (王氏)
  - Chen Shubiao, Prince of Huainan (淮南王 陳叔彪), 13th son
  - Chen Shuxiong, Prince of Bashan (巴山王 陳叔雄; d. 589), 18th son
- Lady, of the Wu clan (吳氏)
  - Chen Shuzhong, Prince of Shixing (始興王 陳叔重), 14th son
  - Princess Wucheng (武成公主)
- Lady, of the Xu clan (徐氏)
  - Chen Shuyan, Prince of Xunyang (尋陽王 陳叔儼; 573–589), 15th son
- Lady, of the Chunyu clan (淳于氏)
  - Chen Shushen, Prince of Yueyang (岳陽王 陳叔慎; 572–589), 16th son
- Lady, of the Shi clan (施氏; 551–609)
  - Chen Shu'ao, Prince of Linhe (臨賀王 陳叔敖), 21st son
  - Chen Shuxing, Prince of Yuanling (沅陵王 陳叔興; 573–607), 26th son
  - Princess Ningyuan (寧遠公主; 577–605), 14th daughter
    - Married Yang Jian (541–604) in 589
- Lady, of the Ceng clan (曾氏)
  - Chen Shuxuan, Prince of Yangshan (陽山王 陳叔宣), 22nd son
- Lady, of the Yang clan (楊氏)
  - Chen Shumu, Prince of Xiyang (西陽王 陳叔穆), 23rd son
- Lady, of the Yuan clan (袁氏)
  - Chen Shuchun, Prince of Xinxing (新興王 陳叔純), 28th son
- Lady, of the Wu clan (吳氏)
  - Chen Shumo, Prince of Badong (巴東王 陳叔謨), 29th son
- Lady, of the Liu clan (劉氏)
  - Chen Shuxian, Prince of Linjiang (臨江王 陳叔顯), 30th son
- Lady, of the Qin clan (秦氏)
  - Chen Shulong, Prince of Xinning (新寧王 陳叔隆), 32nd son
  - Chen Shurong, Prince of Xinchang (新昌王 陳叔榮; 577–612), 33rd son
- Unknown
  - Chen Shurui (陳叔睿), 35th son
  - Chen Shuzhong (陳叔忠), 36th son
  - Chen Shuhong (陳叔弘), 37th son
  - Chen Shuyi (陳叔毅), 38th son
  - Chen Shuxun (陳叔訓), 39th son
  - Chen Shuwu (陳叔武), 40th son
  - Chen Shuchu (陳叔處), 41st son
  - Chen Shufeng (陳叔封), 42nd son
  - Princess Qixi (齊熙公主), personal name Jingling (淨玲), 13th daughter
    - Married Shen Shu'an (沈叔安)
  - A daughter who married Heruo Bi (賀若弼; 544–607) in 589

Regnal titles
Preceded by Emperor Fei of Chen	Emperor of the Chen dynasty 569–582	Succeeded by Chen Shubao
