= Names of Japan =

The word Japan is an exonym, and is used (in one form or another) by many languages. The Japanese names for Japan are Nihon ([ɲi.hoꜜɴ], hiragana: にほん) and Nippon ([ɲip.poꜜɴ] hiragana: にっぽん). They are both written in Japanese using the kanji 日本.

During the early imperial period in China, Japan was known as Wa (倭) or Wa-koku (倭國, literally "Wa-nation" or "Wa-state"), which can mean either "dwarf" or "submissive". Japanese scribes found fault with its offensive connotation, and officially changed the characters they used to spell the native name for Japan, then known as Yamato, replacing the 倭 ("dwarf") character Wa with the homophone 和 ("peaceful, harmonious"). Wa 和 was often combined with 大 ("great") to form the name 大和, which is read as Yamato (see also Jukujikun for a discussion of this type of spelling where the kanji and pronunciations are not directly related). The earliest record of Nippon (日本) appears in the Chinese Old Book of Tang, which notes the change in 703 when Japanese envoys requested that its name be changed. It is believed that the name change within Japan itself took place sometime between 665 and 703, during the Heian period, Yamato (大和) was gradually replaced by Nippon (日本). In 1076, Turkic scholar Mahmud al-Kashgari in his book Dīwān Lughāt al-Turk mentioned this country as 'Jabarqa' (جَابَرْقَا). Marco Polo called Japan 'Cipangu' around 1300, based on the Chinese enunciation of the name, probably 日本國; 'sun source country' (compare modern Min Nan pronunciation ji̍t pún kok). In the 16th century in Malacca, Portuguese traders first heard from Malay the names Jepang, Jipang, and Jepun. In 1577 it was first recorded in English, spelled Giapan. At the end of the 16th century, Portuguese missionaries came to coastal islands of Japan and created brief grammars and dictionaries of Middle Japanese for the purpose of trade. The 1603–1604 dictionary Vocabvlario da Lingoa de Iapam has 2 entries: nifon and iippon. Since then many derived names of Japan appeared on early-modern European maps.

== History ==
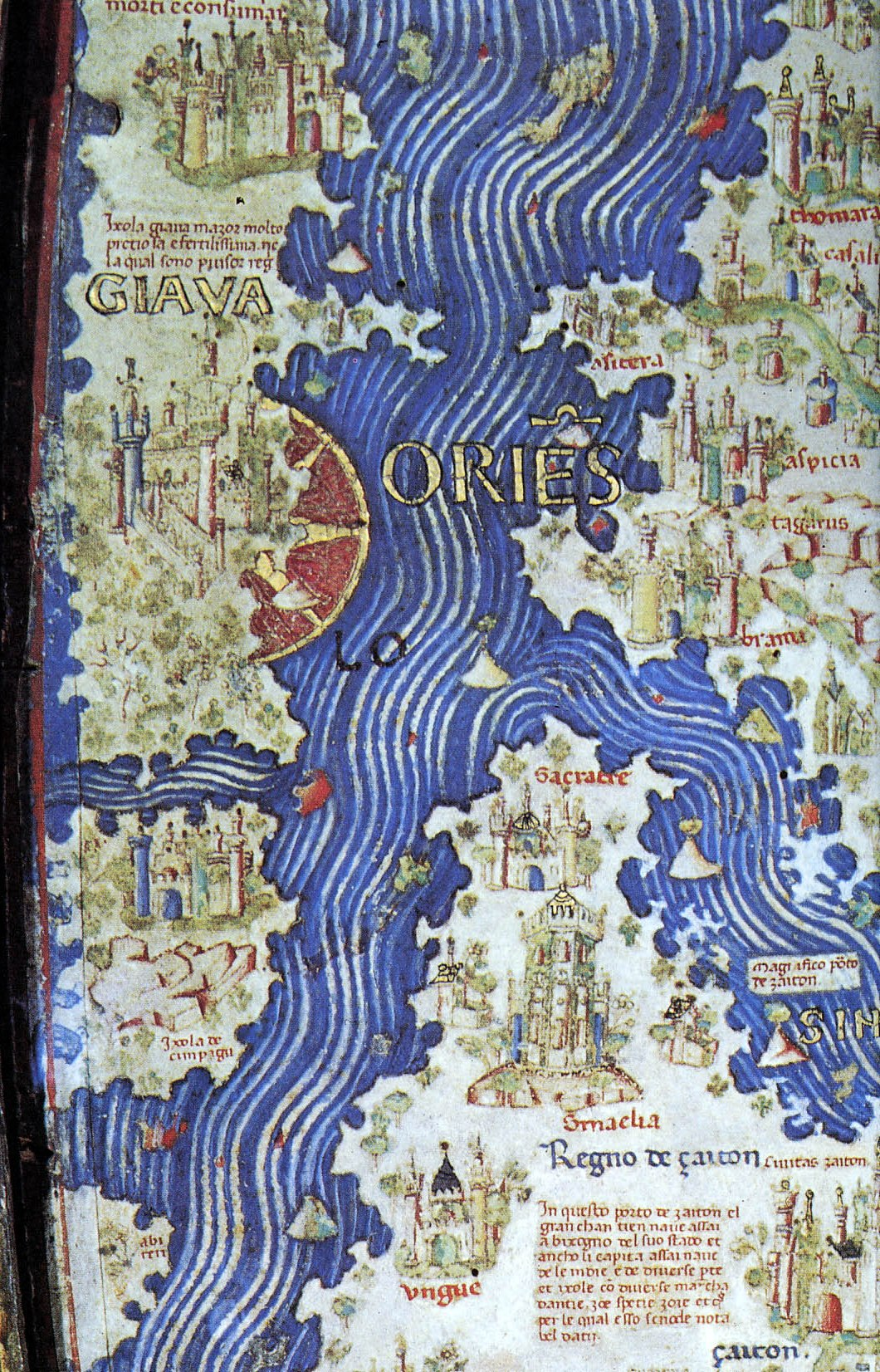
Cipangu (cited as ixola de cimpagu on the center-left) on the 1453 Fra Mauro map, the first known Western depiction of the island

Both Nippon and Nihon literally mean "the sun's origin", that is, where the sun originates, and are often translated as the Land of the Rising Sun. This nomenclature comes from Imperial correspondence with the Chinese Sui dynasty and refers to Japan's eastern position relative to China. Before Nihon came into official use, Japan was known as Wa (倭) or Wakoku (倭国). Wa was a name early China used to refer to an ethnic group living in Japan around the time of the Three Kingdoms period.

== Etymology ==
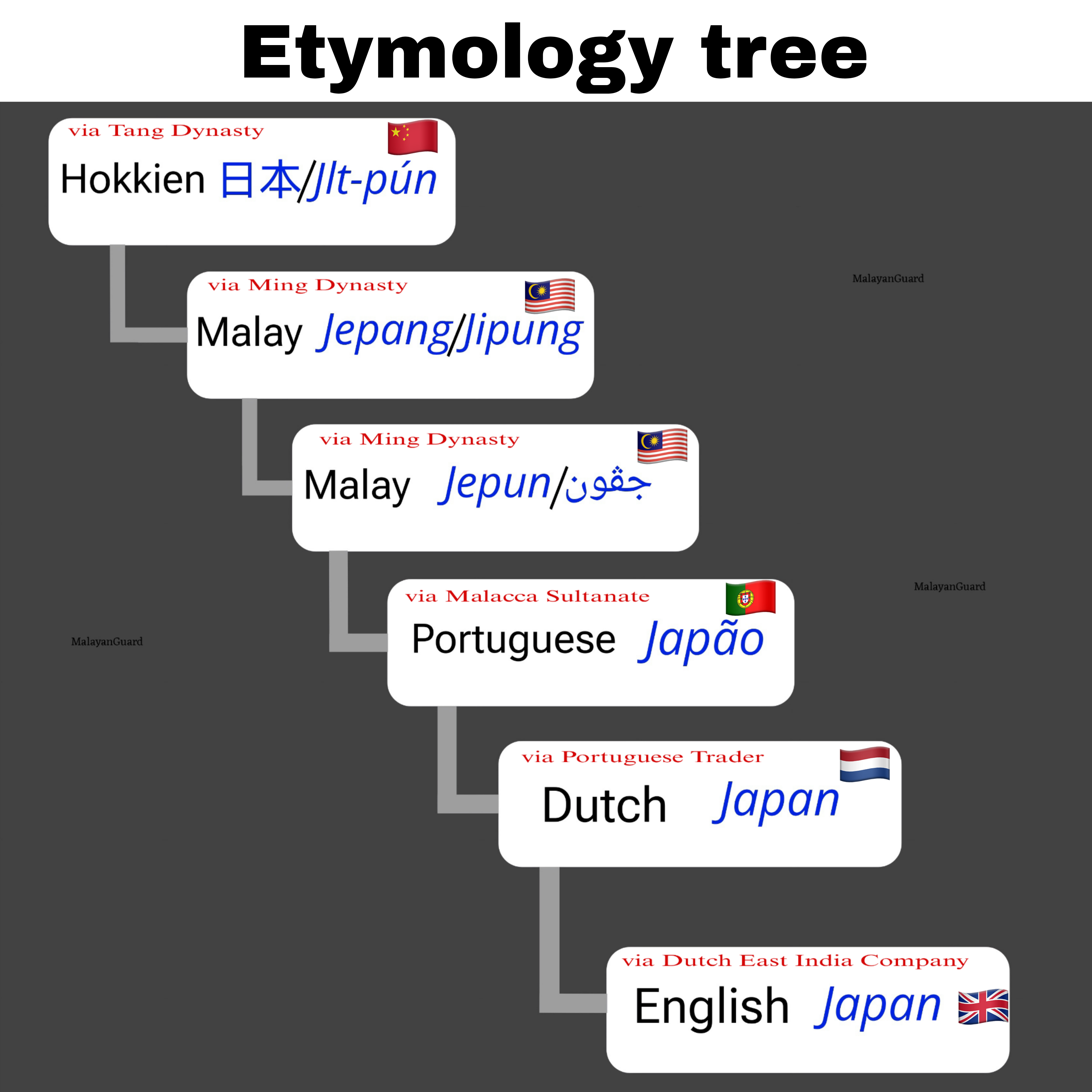
The etymology tree for Japan

=== Wa ===
Although the etymological origins of "Wa" remain uncertain, Chinese historical texts recorded an ancient people residing in the Japanese archipelago (perhaps Kyūshū), named something like *ˀWâ or *ˀWər 倭. Carr (1992:9–10) surveys prevalent proposals for Wa's etymology ranging from feasible (transcribing Japanese first-person pronouns waga 我が "my; our" and ware 我 "I; oneself; thou") to shameful (writing Japanese Wa as 倭 implying "dwarf"), and summarizes interpretations for *ˀWâ "Japanese" into variations on two etymologies: "behaviorally 'submissive' or physically 'short'." The first "submissive; obedient" explanation began with the (121 CE) Shuowen Jiezi dictionary. It defines 倭 as shùnmào 順皃 "obedient/submissive/docile appearance", graphically explains the "person; human" radical 亻 with a wěi 委 "bent" phonetic, and quotes the above Shijing poem. "Conceivably, when Chinese first met Japanese," Carr (1992:9) suggests "they transcribed Wa as *ˀWâ 'bent back' signifying 'compliant' bowing/obeisance. Bowing is noted in early historical references to Japan." Examples include "Respect is shown by squatting" (Hou Han Shu, tr. Tsunoda 1951:2), and "they either squat or kneel, with both hands on the ground. This is the way they show respect." (Wei Zhi, tr. Tsunoda 1951:13). Koji Nakayama interprets wēi 逶 "winding" as "very far away" and euphemistically translates Wō 倭 as "separated from the continent." The second etymology of wō 倭 meaning "dwarf, pygmy" has possible cognates in ǎi 矮 "low, short (of stature)", wō 踒 "strain; sprain; bent legs", and wò 臥 "lie down; crouch; sit (animals and birds)". Early Chinese dynastic histories refer to a Zhūrúguó 侏儒國 "pygmy/dwarf country" located south of Japan, associated with possibly Okinawa Island or the Ryukyu Islands. Carr cites the historical precedence of construing Wa as "submissive people" and the "Country of Dwarfs" legend as evidence that the "little people" etymology was a secondary development.

Chinese, Korean, and Japanese scribes regularly wrote Wa or Yamato "Japan" with the Chinese character 倭 until the 8th century, when the Japanese found fault with it due to its offensive connotation, replacing it with 和 "harmony, peace, balance". Retroactively, this character was adopted in Japan to refer to the country itself, often combined with the character 大 (literally meaning "Great"), so as to write the name as Yamato (大和) (Great Wa, in a manner similar to e.g. 大清帝國 Great Qing Empire, 大英帝國 Empire of Great Britain). However, the pronunciation Yamato cannot be formed from the sounds of its constituent characters; it refers to a place in Japan and, based on the specific spellings used in ancient documents (see also Man'yōgana and Old Japanese#Vowels), this may have originally meant "Mountain Place" (山処). Such words which use certain kanji to name a certain Japanese word solely for the purpose of representing the word's meaning regardless of the given kanji's on'yomi or kun'yomi, a.k.a. jukujikun, is not uncommon in Japanese. Other original names in Chinese texts include Yamatai country (邪馬台国), where a Queen Himiko lived. When hi no moto, the indigenous Japanese way of saying "sun's origin", was written in kanji, it was given the characters 日本. In time, these characters began to be read using Sino-Japanese readings, first Nippon and later Nihon, although the two names are interchangeable to this day.

=== Nippon ===
Excerpt of Yegun's Epitaph

The very first historically attested record of Nippon (日本) is found in an epitaph of a Paekche individual called Yegun (禰軍; 예군), believed to have been created around 678 that was discovered in 2011. The epitaph engraves the aftermath of the Battle of Baekgang where Silla and Tang alliance invaded Paekche and many of the refugees fled to Japan as Toraijins.

『日本餘噍 據扶桑以逋誅』

"The refugees of Ilbon (日本; referring to Paekche) safely retreated with the help of Busang Kingdom (扶桑; referring to Japan) from the invaders (Silla–Tang alliance)."

— Excerpt from "Yegun's Epithaph", 678 CE

According to Chinese historian Lianlong Wang (王連龍), the characters of Nippon are referring to the kingdom of Paekche as Japan was referred to as Busang Kingdom (扶桑國). Historically, "Busang Kingdom (also known as "Fusang" in Chinese)" was reserved for the "farthest east kingdom" depending on the nation that used it (i.e. Korea was a "Fusang Kingdom" from China's perspective) similar to Cheonggu/Qingqiu. However, since the individual was Korean, "Busang Kingdom" in the context of his epitaph was directing it towards Japan (then Yamato Kingship) as the kingdom of Japan was farthest east from Korea's perspective, while Nippon was dedicated to Paekche, his home nation. Japanese historian Haruyuki Tono (東野 治之) also made a similar conclusion, stating that the term Nippon originally meant "Paekche" before being adopted by the Japanese most likely due to the influence from the Paekche Toraijins.

Nippon also appeared in history only at the end of the 7th century. The Old Book of Tang (舊唐書; 945), one of the Twenty-Four Histories, also stated that the Japanese envoy disliked his country's name Woguo (Chinese) (倭國), and changed it to Nippon (日本), or "Origin of the Sun". Another 8th-century chronicle, True Meaning of Shiji (史記正義), however, states that the first female Chinese Emperor Wu Zetian ordered a Japanese envoy to change the country's name to Nippon. It has been suggested that the name change in Japan may have taken place sometime between 665 and 703, and Wu Zetian then acceded to the name change in China following a request from a delegation from Japan in 703. The sun plays an important role in Japanese mythology and religion as the emperor is said to be the direct descendant of the sun goddess Amaterasu and the legitimacy of the ruling house rested on this divine appointment and descent from the chief deity of the predominant Shinto religion. The name of the country reflects this central importance of the sun. The association of the country with the sun was indicated in a letter sent in 607 and recorded in the official history of the Sui dynasty. Prince Shōtoku, the Regent of Japan, sent a mission to China with a letter in which he called the emperor of Japan (actually an empress at the time) "the Son of Heaven of the Land where the Sun rises" (日出處天子). The message said: "The Son of Heaven, on the Land of the Rising Sun, sends this letter to the Son of Heaven of the Land, where the Sun sets, and wishes him well".

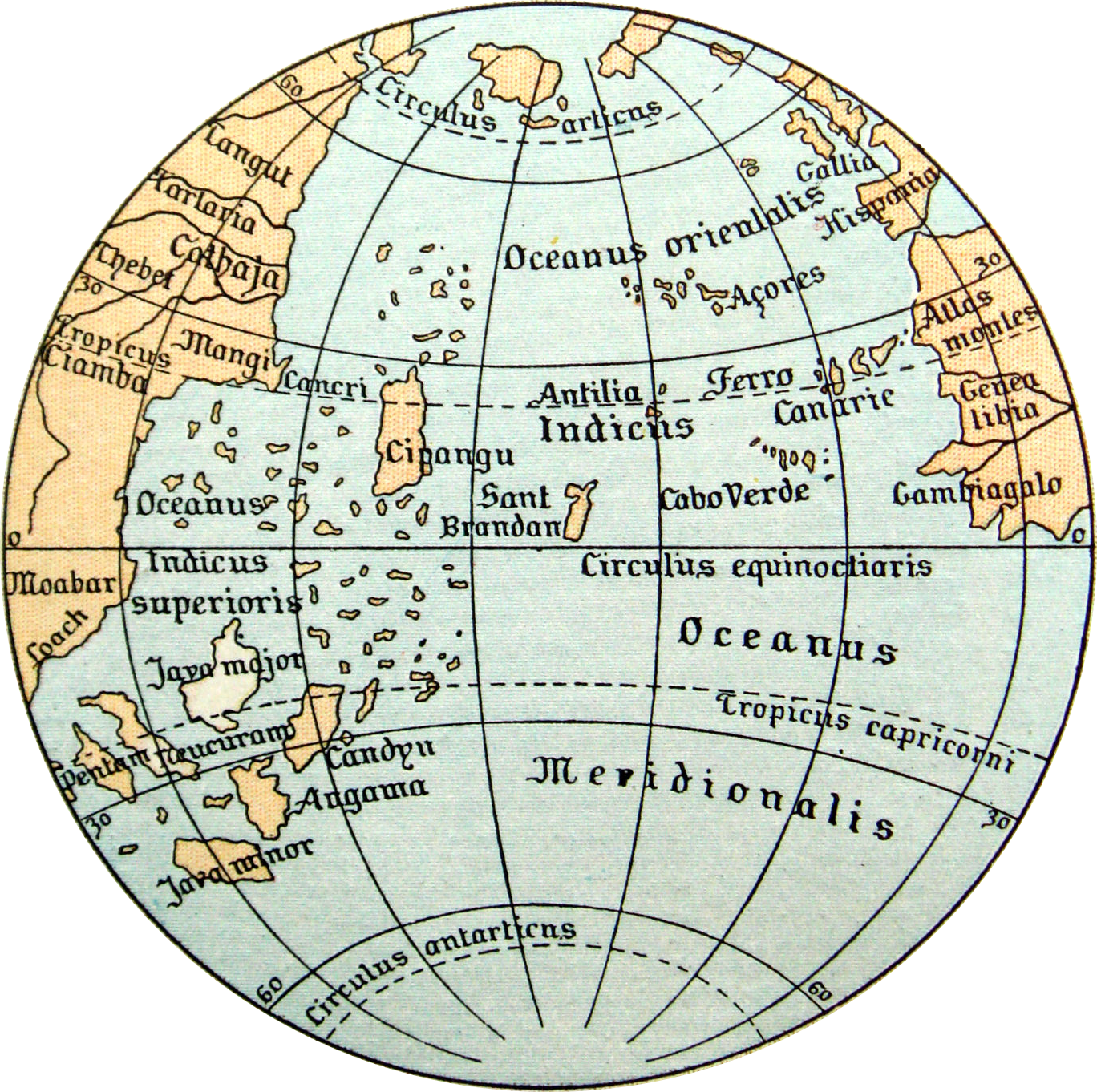
Cipangu described on the 1492 Martin Behaim globe

The English word for Japan came to the West from early trade routes. The early Mandarin Chinese or possibly Wu Chinese word for Japan was recorded by Marco Polo as Cipangu. The Malay and Indonesian words Jepang, Jipang, and Jepun were borrowed from non-Mandarin Chinese languages, and this Malay word was encountered by Portuguese traders in Malacca in the 16th century. It is thought the Portuguese traders were the first to bring the word to Europe. It was first recorded in English in 1577 spelled Giapan.

In English, the modern official title of the country is simply "Japan", one of the few countries to have no "long form" name. The official Japanese-language name is Nippon-koku or Nihon-koku (日本国), literally "Nation of Japan". As an adjective, the term "Dai-Nippon" remains popular with Japanese governmental, commercial, or social organizations whose reach extend beyond Japan's geographic borders (e.g., Dai Nippon Printing, Dai Nippon Butoku Kai, etc.).

Though Nippon or Nihon are still by far the most popular names for Japan from within the country, recently the foreign words Japan and even Jipangu (from Cipangu, see below) have been used in Japanese mostly for the purpose of foreign branding.

== Phonology ==
Portuguese missionaries arrived in Japan at the end of the 16th century. In the course of learning Japanese, they created several grammars and dictionaries of Middle Japanese. The 1603–1604 dictionary Vocabvlario da Lingoa de Iapam contains two entries for Japan: nifon and iippon. The title of the dictionary (Vocabulary of the Language of Japan) illustrates that the Portuguese word for Japan was by that time Iapam.

=== Nifon ===
Historically, Japanese /h/ has undergone a number of phonological changes. Originally *[p], this weakened into [ɸ] and eventually became the modern [h]. Modern /h/ is still pronounced [ɸ] when followed by /ɯ/.

Middle Japanese nifon becomes Modern Japanese nihon via regular phonological changes.

=== Jippon ===
Before modern styles of romanization, the Portuguese devised their own. In it, /zi/ is written as either ii or ji. In modern Hepburn style, iippon would be rendered as Jippon. There are no historical phonological changes to take into account here.

Etymologically, Jippon is similar to Nippon in that it is an alternative reading of 日本. The initial character 日 may also be read as /ziti/ or /zitu/. Compounded with /hoɴ/ (本), this regularly becomes Jippon.

Unlike the Nihon/Nippon doublet, there is no evidence for a *Jihon.

== Nihon and Nippon ==
The Japanese name for Japan, 日本, can be pronounced either Nihon or Nippon. Both readings come from the on'yomi.

=== Meaning ===
The national flag of Japan is a rectangular white banner with a red circle at its center. The flag is officially called the Nisshōki (日章旗, 'flag of the sun') but is more commonly known in Japan as the Hinomaru (日の丸, 'circle of the sun'). It embodies the country's sobriquet: the Land of the Rising Sun.

日 (nichi) means "sun" or "day"; 本 (hon) means "base" or "origin". The compound means "origin of the sun", or "source of the sun" or "where the sun rises" (from a westbound point of view—which includes lands west of the nation, the sun rises from Japan); it is a source for the popular Western description of Japan as the "Land of the Rising Sun".

Nichi, in compounds, often loses the final chi and creates a slight pause between the first and second syllables of the compound. When romanised, this pause is represented by a doubling of the first consonant of the second syllable; thus nichi 日 plus kō 光 (light) is written and pronounced nikkō, meaning sunlight.

Latest by the Meiji era and the promulgation of the first modern constitution the official name was "Empire of Japan" Dai Nippon Teikoku (大日本帝国), which translates to "Empire of Great Japan" (Dai "Great", Nippon "Japanese", Teikoku "Empire"). Due to its name in kanji characters and its flag, it was also given the exonyms "Empire of the Sun" and "Empire of the Rising Sun".

=== Evolution ===
Japanese 日 and 本 were historically pronounced niti (or jitu, reflecting a Late Middle Chinese pronunciation) and pon, respectively. In compounds, however, final voiceless stops (i.e. p, t, k) of the first word were unreleased in Middle Chinese, and the pronunciation of 日本 was thus Nippon or Jippon (with the adjacent consonants assimilating).

Min Chinese languages still retain this pronunciation of 日本, such as Northern Min Nì-bǒ̤ng (Jian'ou dialect) or Fuzhounese Nĭk-buōng. In modern Toisanese, a Yue Chinese language, 日本 is pronounced as Ngìp Bāwn [ŋip˦˨ bɔn˥].

Historical sound change in Japanese has led to the modern pronunciations of the individual characters as nichi and hon. The pronunciation Nihon originated, possibly in the Kantō region, as a reintroduction of this independent pronunciation of 本 into the compound. This must have taken place during the Edo period, after another sound change occurred which would have resulted in this form becoming Niwon and later Nion.

Several attempts to choose a definitive official reading were rejected by the Japanese government, which declared both to be correct.

=== Modern ===
While both pronunciations are correct, Nippon is frequently preferred for official purposes, including money, stamps, and international sporting events, as well as the Nippon-koku, literally the "State of Japan" (日本国).

Other than this, there seem to be no fixed rules for choosing one pronunciation over the other, but in some cases, one form is simply more common. For example, Japanese-speakers generally call their language Nihongo; Nippongo, while possible, is rarely used. In other cases, uses are variable. The name for the Bank of Japan (日本銀行), for example, is given as NIPPON GINKO on banknotes but is often referred to, such as in the media, as Nihon Ginkō.

Nippon is the form that is used usually or exclusively in the following constructions:

- Nippon Yūbin, Nippon Yūsei (Japan Post Group)
- Ganbare Nippon! (A sporting cheer used at international sporting events, roughly, 'do your best, Japan!')
- Nipponbashi (日本橋) (a shopping district in Osaka)
- All Nippon Airways (Zen Nippon Kūyu)
- Nikon (Nippon Kōgaku Kōgyō)
- Nippon Animation
- Nippon Ham
- Nippon Life Insurance
- Nippon Professional Baseball (Nippon Yakyū Kikō)
- Nippon Steel (Nippon Seitetsu)
- Nippon Telegraph and Telephone (Nippon Denshin Denwa)
- Nippon Yusen

Nihon is used always or most often in the following constructions:

- JR Higashi-Nihon (East Japan Railway, JR Group)
- Nihonbashi (日本橋) (a bridge in Tokyo)
- Nihon Daigaku (Nihon University)
- Nihon-go (Japanese language)
- Nihon-jin (日本人) (Japanese people)
- Nihon-kai (Sea of Japan)
- Nihon Kōkū (Japan Airlines)
- Nihon-shoki (an old history book, never Nippon shoki)
- Nihonshu (日本酒; meaning 'Japanese wine')
- Zen Nihon Kendō Renmei (全日本剣道連盟, abbreviated 全剣連 Zen Ken Ren), the Japanese Kendo Federation referred in English as All Japan Kendo Federation (AJKF)
- The Nippon TV network is called Nihon Terebi in Japanese.

In 2016, element 113 on the periodic table was named nihonium to honor its discovery in 2004 by Japanese scientists at RIKEN.

== Jipangu ==
Another spelling, "Zipangri" (upper left), was used on a 1561 map by Sebastian Münster.

As mentioned above, the English word Japan has a circuitous derivation; but linguists believe it derives in part from the Portuguese recording of the Early Mandarin Chinese or Wu Chinese word for Japan: Cipan (日本), which is rendered in pinyin as Rìběn (IPA: ʐʅ˥˩pən˨˩˦), and literally translates to "sun origin". Guó (IPA: kuo˨˦) is Chinese for "realm" or "kingdom", so it could alternatively be rendered as Cipan-guo. The word was likely introduced to Portuguese through the Malay: Jipan.

Cipangu was first mentioned in Europe in the accounts of Marco Polo. It appears for the first time on a European map with the Fra Mauro map in 1457, although it appears much earlier on Chinese and Korean maps such as the Gangnido. Following the accounts of Marco Polo, Cipangu was thought to be fabulously rich in silver and gold, which by Medieval standards was largely correct, owing to the volcanism of the islands and the possibility to access precious ores without resorting to (unavailable) deep-mining technologies.

The modern Shanghainese pronunciation of Japan is Zeppen [zəʔpən]. In modern Japanese, Cipangu is transliterated as チパング which in turn can be transliterated into English as Chipangu, Jipangu, Zipangu, Jipang, or Zipang. Jipangu (ジパング (Zipangu)) as an obfuscated name for Japan has recently come into vogue for Japanese films, anime, and video games.

== Other names ==
=== Classical ===
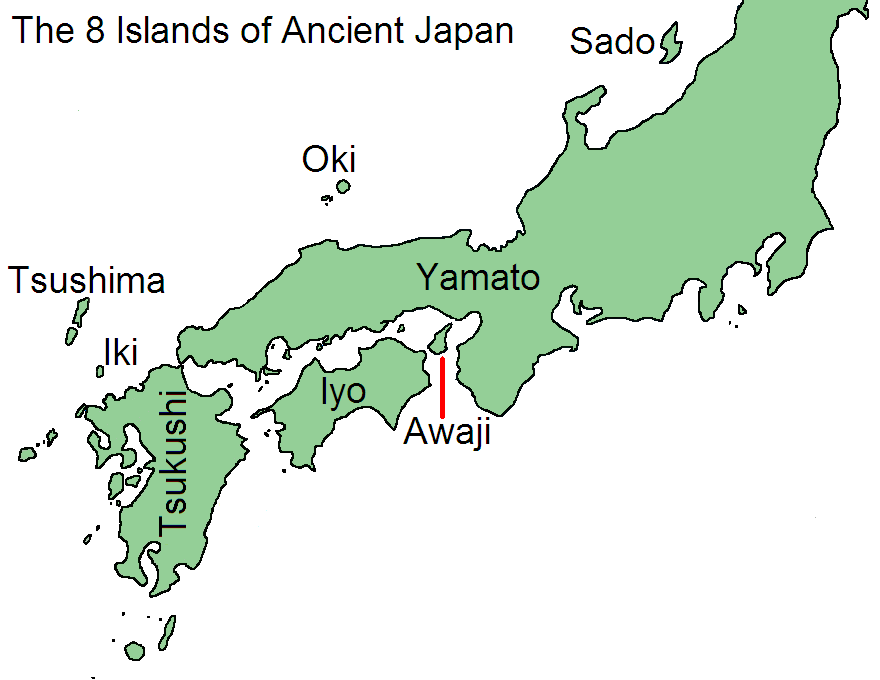
Eight major islands of Japan

These names show up in historical texts for prehistoric legendary dates and also in names of gods and Japanese emperors:

- Ōyashima (大八洲) meaning the Great Country of Eight (or Many) Islands, Awaji, Iyo (later Shikoku), Oki, Tsukushi (later Kyūshū), Iki, Tsushima, Sado, and Yamato (later Honshū); Hokkaidō, Karafuto, Chishima, and Okinawa were not part of Japan in ancient times, as Aynu Mosir (the northern part of the archipelago) was inhabited by a non-Japanese group, the Ainu. The eight islands refers to the creation of the main eight islands of Japan by the gods Izanami and Izanagi in Japanese mythology as well as the fact that eight was a synonym for "many".
- Yashima (八島 or 八洲), "Eight (or Many) Islands"
- Fusō (扶桑), a mythical tree or a mysterious land located to the east of China. The term later became a poetic name of Japan.
- Mizuho (瑞穂) refers to ears of grain, e.g. 瑞穗國 Mizuho-no-kuni "Country of Lush Ears (of Rice)". From Old Japanese midu > Japanese mizu ("water; lushness, freshness, juiciness") + Old Japanese fo > Japanese ho ("ear (of grain, especially rice)").
- Shikishima (敷島) is written with Chinese characters that suggest a meaning "islands that one has spread/laid out", but this name of Japan supposedly originates in the name of an area in Shiki District of Yamato Province in which some emperors of ancient Japan resided. The name of Shikishima (i.e. Shiki District) came to be used in Japanese poetry as an epithet for the province of Yamato (i.e. the ancient predecessor of Nara Prefecture), and was metonymically extended to refer to the entire island of Yamato (i.e. Honshū) and, eventually, to the entire territory of Japan. The word shima, though generally meaning only "island" in Japanese, also means "area, zone, territory" in many languages of the Ryūkyū Islands.
- Akitsukuni (秋津國), Akitsushima (秋津島), Toyo-akitsushima (豐秋津島). According to the literal meanings of the Chinese characters used to transcribe these names of Japan, toyo means "abundant", aki means "autumn", tsu means "harbor", shima means "island", and kuni means "country, land". In this context, -tsu may be interpreted to be a fossilized genitive case suffix, as in matsuge "eyelash" (< Japanese me "eye" + -tsu + Japanese ke "hair") or tokitsukaze "a timely wind, a favorable wind" (< Japanese toki "time" + -tsu + Japanese kaze "wind"). However, akitu or akidu are also archaic or dialectal Japanese words for "dragonfly", so "Akitsushima" may be interpreted to mean 秋津島 (Dragonfly Island). Another possible interpretation would take akitsu- to be identical with the akitsu- of akitsukami or akitsumikami ("god incarnate, a manifest deity", often used as an honorific epithet for the Emperor of Japan), perhaps with the sense of "the present land, the island(s) where we are at present".
- Toyoashihara no mizuho no kuni (豐葦原の瑞穗の國). "Country of Lush Ears of Bountiful Reed Plain(s)", Ashihara no Nakatsukuni, "Central Land of Reed Plains", "Country Amidst Reed Plain(s)" (葦原中國).
- Hinomoto (日の本). Simple kun reading of 日本.
- Oyamoto (大和 o + yamato "Great Yamato"), a literal Japanese reading, and Daiwa (大和 dai + wa "Great Wa"), a Sino-Japanese reading, are alternate readings of 大和, which is usually read as Yamato. Oyamoto is mostly used in historical or poetic contexts, while Daiwa is widely used in modern corporate names.

The katakana transcription ジャパン (Japan) of the English word Japan is sometimes encountered in Japanese, for example in the names of organizations seeking to project an international image. Examples include ジャパンネット銀行 (Japan Netto Ginkō) (Japan Net Bank), ジャパンカップ (Japan Kappu) (Japan Cup), ワイヤレスジャパン (Waiyaresu Japan) (Wireless Japan), etc.

=== In other Eastern Asian languages ===
Dōngyáng (東洋) and Dōngyíng (東瀛) – both literally, "Eastern Ocean" – are Chinese terms sometimes used to refer to Japan exotically when contrasting it with other countries or regions in eastern Eurasia; however, these same terms may also be used to refer to all of East Asia when contrasting "the East" with "the West". The first term, Dōngyáng, has been considered to be a pejorative term when used to mean "Japan", while the second, Dōngyíng, has remained a positive poetic name. They can be contrasted with Nányáng (Southern Ocean), which refers to Southeast Asia, and Xīyáng (Western Ocean), which refers to the Western world. In Japanese and Korean, the Chinese word for "Eastern Ocean" (pronounced as tōyō in Japanese and as dongyang (동양) in Korean) is used only to refer to the Far East (including both East Asia and Southeast Asia) in general, and it is not used in the more specific Chinese sense of "Japan".

In Mandarin Chinese, Japan is called Rìběn 日本. The Cantonese pronunciation of "日本" is Yahtbún [jɐt˨ pun˧˥], the Shanghainese pronunciation is Zeppen [zəʔpən], the Hokkien pronunciation is Ji̍tpún or Li̍t-pún, the standard Hakka pronunciation is Ngi̍t-pún and the Teochew pronunciation is Ji̍k púng . This has influenced the Malay name for Japan, Jepun, and the Thai word Yipun (ญี่ปุ่น). The terms Jepang and Jipang were previously used in both Malay and Indonesian, but are today confined primarily to the Indonesian language. The Japanese introduced Nippon and Dai Nippon into Indonesia during the Japanese Occupation (1942–1945) but the native Jepang remains more common. In Korean, Japan is called Ilbon (Hangul: 일본, Hanja: 日本), which is the Korean pronunciation of the Sino-Korean name, and in Sino-Vietnamese, Japan is called Nhật Bản (also rendered as Nhựt Bổn). In Mongolian, Japan is called Yapon (Япон).

Ue-kok (倭國) is recorded for older Hokkien speakers. In the past, Korea also used 倭國, pronounced Waeguk (왜국).

=== Notation on old European maps ===
These are historic names of Japan that were noted on old maps issued in Europe.

- CIPANGU, circa 1300
- 「IAPAM」, circa 1560
- ZIPANGNI, 1561
- 「IAPAN」, circa 1567
- 「JAPAN」, unknown first year.
- IAPONIA, 1595
- 「IAPAO」, 1628
- 「IAPON」, unknown first year.
- 「NIPHON」, circa 1694 (Note: In the novel "Moby-Dick; or, The Whale" published in October 1851, the notation "Niphon" appears when checking nautical charts.)
- 「JAPAM」, 1628
- 「YAPAN」, 1628
- HET KONINKRYK JAPAN, circa 1730
- JAPANIÆ REGNVM, 1739

=== Emoji ===
Unicode includes several character sequences that have been used to represent Japan graphically:

- U+1F5FE 🗾 SILHOUETTE OF JAPAN. Japan is the only country with a map representation in Unicode.
- 🇯🇵, a sequence of regional indicator symbols corresponding to JP that are often displayed as a flag of Japan.

== Contemporary names ==
These are some of the contemporary names for Japan in different languages.

Language	Contemporary name for Japan (romanization)
Albanian	Japonia
Amharic	ጃፓን (japani)
Arabic	اليابان (al-yābān)
Armenian	ճապոնիա (Chaponia)
Azerbaijani	Yaponiya
Bengali	জাপান (Japan)
Basque	Japonia
Belarusian	Японія (Japonija)
Bulgarian	Япония (Yaponiya)
Cantonese	Yat Bun
Catalan	Japó
Cornish	Nihon
Croatian	Japan
Czech	Japonsko
Danish	Japan
Dutch	Japan
English	Japan
Filipino	Hapón (from Spanish, Japón)
Finnish	Japani
French	Japon
Galician	O Xapón
Georgian	იაპონია (iaponia)
German	Japan
Greek	Ιαπωνία (Iaponía)
Hawaiian	Iapana
Hebrew	יפן (Yapan)
Hindi	जापान (jāpān)
Hungarian	Japán
Icelandic	Japan
Indonesian	Jepang
Irish	An tSeapáin
Italian	Giappone
Kannada	ಜಪಾನ್ (jāpān)
Kazakh	Жапония (Japoniya)
Khmer	ជប៉ុន (Chôpŏn)
Laotian	ຍີ່ປຸ່ນ (nyipun)
Lithuanian	Japonija
Malay	Jepun (جڤون)
Malayalam	ജപ്പാൻ (jappān)
Maltese	Ġappun
Manx	Yn çhapaan
Marathi	जपान (japān)
Mongolian	Япон (Yapon)
Norwegian	Japan
Persian	ژاپن (žāpon) in Iran and جاپان (jāpān) in Afghanistan
Polish	Japonia
Portuguese	Japão
Quechua	Nihun
Romanian	Japonia
Russian	Япония (Yaponiya)
Scottish Gaelic	Iapan
Serbian	Јапан (Japan)
Sinhala	ජපානය (Japanaya)
Slovak	Japonsko
Slovenian	Japonska
Spanish	Japón
Swedish	Japan
Tamil	ஜப்பான் (Jappaan)
Thai	ญี่ปุ่น (yîi-bpùn)
Turkish	Japonya
Ukrainian	Японія (Yaponiya)
Urdu	جاپان (jāpān)
Vietnamese	Nhật Bản
Welsh	Japan (sometimes spelt Siapan)
Xhosa	Japhan

== See also ==
- Al-Wakwak
- Japanese name (names of Japanese people)
- Japanese place names
- List of country-name etymologies
- Little China (ideology)

== Notes ==
By ISO 639-3 code
Enter an ISO code to find the corresponding language article.
