= Asadal =

Mythical city of Ancient Korean kingdom of Gojoseon

- Hangul: 아사달
- Hanja: 阿斯達
- RR: Asadal
- MR: Asadal

Asadal, (Korean: 아사달; Hanja: 阿斯達) was the capital city of the kingdom of Old Chosŏn (고조선; 古朝鮮; Gojoseon), the first Korean kingdom and notably founded by the legendary king Tan'gun. It is thought that Asadal was located in north-central Korea, in the western Hwanghae Province in modern North Korea or in the Pyongyang Province (평양; 平壤, with no relation to the modern-day capital of North Korea).

== Etymology ==
The etymology of "Asadal" is uncertain. One hypothesis is that the word 아사달 is a compound composed of two elements, asa + dal; this hypothesis is primarily motivated by an assumption of equivalence between the Chinese phonetic transcription 阿斯達 Asīdá and the word 조선 Joseon (朝鮮, Cháoxiǎn or Cháoxiān, in Chinese), another name for Korea. However, the etymology of 조선 Joseon is ultimately unknown, with opinions differing as to whether the word was created as a phonetic transcription or as a semantic calque (presumably of a foreign word). Furthermore, the reading of the Mandarin Chinese character 朝 (cháo) in Cháoxian (Joseon) is identical to the reading when used to mean "dynasty," not with the reading when used to mean "morning" (which would instead be zhāo).

However, the character 斯, which is used in modern Chinese languages mainly to represent the phonemes /s/ or /θ/ in word-final and preconsonantal positions when transcribing foreign words, has always had a sibilant (/s/) rather than an affricate like the Korean (/ch/), and there are plenty of other characters better suited to transcribing the Korean sound. The second part, dal, might be the result of reading Chinese characters in the Korean way; if so, the original Chinese pronunciation at the time Asadal was recorded in historical texts could have been Asada, with the final syllable (-da) as a transcription of the Middle Korean word ᄯᅡᇂ〮 (stáh), Early Modern Korean ᄯᅡ (sta), Modern Korean 따 (tta) or 땅 (ttang), meaning "land." In this case, Asadal would mean "Morning Land." If, however, the final syllable was used much like the Goryeo city-name suffix -dal (used for mountains or cities founded on plateaus/mountains), then Asadal would mean "Morning Mountain."

It also draws possible connections to the Japanese word "Asa (あさ)" meaning "morning (朝)". The modern Korean word for morning "Achim" (아침) is thought to have evolved from Middle Korean "Achom (아ᄎᆞᆷ〮)." Using Japanese Asa as a cognate, alongside the aforementioned theories, it can be deduced that "Asadal" most likely meant "Morning Land" or "Morning Mountain".

『日本餘噍 據扶桑以逋誅』

"The refugees of Ilbon (日本; referring to Paekche) safely retreated with the help of Busang Kingdom (扶桑; referring to Japan) from the invaders (Silla–Tang alliance)."

— Excerpt from "Yegun's Epithaph", 678 CE

In fact, up until the Yamato Kingdom changed its name from "Wakoku (倭国)" to "Nihon (日本)", ancient Korean kingdoms such as Paekche had used the same characters "Ilbon (日本)", literally meaning "Land where the sun rises" (no relations to Japan) when it colloquially addressed itself (as seen in Yegun, a Paekche nationalist and loyalist of King Uija, in his epitaph), seeming to have carried over the meaning of "Morning Land" from Asadal.

== History ==
The first Korean historical work that mention Asadal is the Samguk yusa, which cites the Chinese Book of Wei. The Samguk yusa also cites the lost historical records of Go-gi (고기; 古記; lit. ''Old Analects/Records'') to the effect that Tan'gun's capital was located in Pyongyang. But recent studies show that there were more than one city named Pyongyang (which literally means "flat soil" in Chinese), situated in the north deep in Manchuria - possibly bordering in between China and Russia. The modern Pyongyang, capital of North Korea, is actually the southern counterpart. At that time it was common for an emperor to manage two capitals and rule in two palaces. Therefore, it could be that the "true" Asadal is located in Manchuria.

== See also ==
- Wanggeom-seong, a capital of later Old Chosŏn

== Other sources ==
- Lee, Peter H & Wm. Theodore De Bary. Sources of Korean Tradition, page 5-6. Columbia University Press, 1997.
