= Names of Korea =

The name of Korea was first recorded in Chinese classic Shanhaijing vol.12. As shown in the picture, “Korea is located on the east of Lieyang (列陽, lit. 'Yang side of the Lie River'), south of Haibei Mountains; Lieyang belongs to the state of Yan."

There are various names of Korea in use today that are all derived from those of ancient Koreanic kingdoms and dynasties. The choice of name often depends on the language, whether the user is referring to either or both modern Korean countries, and even the user's political views on the Korean conflict.

The name Korea is an exonym, derived from Goryeo or Koryŏ. Both North Korea and South Korea use the name in English. However, in the Korean language, the two Koreas use different terms to refer to the nominally unified nation: Joseon or Chosŏn (조선; 朝鮮) in North Korea and Hanguk (한국; 韓國) in South Korea.

== History ==
The earliest records of Korean history are written in Chinese characters called hanja. Even after the invention of hangul, Koreans generally recorded native Korean names with hanja, by translation of meaning, transliteration of sound, or even combinations of the two. Furthermore, the pronunciations of the same character are somewhat different in Korean and the various Korean dialects, and have changed over time.

For all these reasons, in addition to the sparse and sometimes contradictory written records, it is often difficult to determine the original meanings or pronunciations of ancient names.

=== Ancient history ===
==== Gojoseon ====
Until 108 BC, northern Korea and part of Manchuria were controlled by Gojoseon. In contemporaneous Chinese records, it was written as 朝鮮, which is pronounced in modern Korean as Joseon (조선). Historically, these characters have been read in the Korean language as 됴션 Dyosyen; 조선 Joseon is a very recent spelling, reformed to reflect recent changes in the phonology of the Korean language. The prefixing of Go- (古), meaning "old" or "ancient," is a historiographical convention that distinguishes it from the later Joseon dynasty. The name Joseon is also now still used by North Koreans and Koreans living in China and Japan to refer to the peninsula, and as the official Korean form of the name of Democratic People's Republic of Korea (Joseon). Cognates of 朝鮮 Joseon are also used in many Asian languages, such as Japanese, Vietnamese, and Chinese, to refer to the Korean Peninsula.

Possibly the Chinese characters phonetically transcribed a native Korean name, perhaps pronounced something like "Jyusin". Some speculate that it also corresponds to Chinese references to 肅愼 (숙신, Suksin (ethnic group)), 稷愼 (직신, Jiksin) and 息愼 (식신, Siksin), although these latter names probably describe the ancestors of the Jurchen people.

Other scholars believe 朝鮮 was a translation (like Japanese kun'yomi) of the native Korean Asadal (아사달), the capital of Gojoseon: asa being a hypothetical Altaic root word for "morning", and dal meaning "mountain", a common ending for Goguryeo place names (with the use of the character 鮮 "fresh" to transcribe the final -dal syllable possibly having been based on the pronunciation of the ancient ancestor of Middle Korean dɔl- > Modern Korean 달 dal- "sweet").

An early attempt to translate these characters into English gave rise to the expression "The Land of the Morning Calm" for Korea, which parallels the expression "The Land of the Rising Sun" for Japan. While the wording is fanciful, the essence of the translation is valid.

==== Han ====
Around the time of Gojoseon's fall, various chiefdoms in southern Korea grouped into confederacies, collectively called the Samhan (삼한; 三韓; lit. 'Three Han'). Han is a native Korean root for "leader" or "great", as in maripgan ("king", archaic), hanabi ("grandfather", archaic), and Hanbat ("Great Field", archaic name for Daejeon).

Han was transliterated in Chinese records as 韓; hán (한), 幹; gàn (간), 刊; kān (간), and 干; gān (간). The Korean name Han is etymologically disconnected from both the Chinese state 韓; hán, despite sharing the same Chinese character, and the Han (漢; hàn) dynasty along with the associated ethnicity.

Beginning in the 7th century, the name "Samhan" became synonymous with the Three Kingdoms of Korea. According to the Samguk sagi and Samguk yusa, Silla implemented a national policy, "Samhan Unification" (삼한일통; 三韓一統), to integrate Baekje and Goguryeo refugees. In 1982, a memorial stone dating back to 686 was discovered in Cheongju with an inscription: "The Three Han were unified and the domain was expanded." During the Later Silla period, the concepts of Samhan as the ancient confederacies and the Three Kingdoms of Korea were merged. In a letter to an imperial tutor of the Tang dynasty, Ch'oe Ch'i-wŏn equated Byeonhan to Baekje, Jinhan to Silla, and Mahan to Goguryeo. By the Goryeo period, Samhan became a common name to refer to all of Korea. In his Ten Mandates to his descendants, Wang Geon declared that he had unified the Three Han (Samhan), referring to the Three Kingdoms of Korea. Samhan continued to be a common name for Korea during the Joseon period and was widely referenced in the Annals of the Joseon Dynasty.

In China, the Three Kingdoms of Korea were collectively called Samhan since the beginning of the 7th century. The use of the name Samhan to indicate the Three Kingdoms of Korea was widespread in the Tang dynasty. Goguryeo was alternately called Mahan by the Tang dynasty, as evidenced by a Tang document that called Goguryeo generals "Mahan leaders" (마한추장; 馬韓酋長) in 645. In 651, Emperor Gaozong of Tang sent a message to the king of Baekje referring to the Three Kingdoms of Korea as Samhan. Epitaphs of the Tang dynasty, including those belonging to Baekje, Goguryeo, and Silla refugees and migrants, called the Three Kingdoms of Korea "Samhan", especially Goguryeo. For example, the epitaph of Go Hyeon (고현; 高玄), a Tang dynasty general of Goguryeo origin who died in 690, calls him a "Liaodong Samhan man" (요동 삼한인; 遼東 三韓人). The History of Liao equates Byeonhan to Silla, Jinhan to Buyeo, and Mahan to Goguryeo.

The "Han" in the names of the Korean Empire, Daehan Jeguk, and the Republic of Korea (South Korea), Daehanminguk or Hanguk, are named in reference to the Three Kingdoms of Korea, not the ancient confederacies in the southern Korean Peninsula.

==== Goryeo ====
Around the beginning of the Common Era, remnants of the fallen Gojoseon were re-united and expanded by the kingdom of Goguryeo, one of the Three Kingdoms of Korea. It, too, was a native Korean word, probably pronounced something like "Guri", transcribed with various hanja characters: 高句麗, 高勾麗, or 高駒麗 (고구려, Goguryeo), 高麗 (고려, Goryeo), 高離 (고리, Gori), or 句麗 (구려, Guryeo). The source native name is thought to be either *Guru ("walled city, castle, fortress"; attested in Chinese historical documents, but not in native Korean sources) or *Gauri ("center, middle"; cf. Middle Korean *gaβɔndɔy and Standard Modern Korean gaunde 가운데).

The theory that Goguryeo referenced the founder's surname has been largely discredited (the royal surname changed from Hae to Go long after the state's founding).

=== Revival of the names ===
In the south, the Samhan resolved into the kingdoms of Baekje and Silla, constituting, with Goguryeo, the Three Kingdoms of Korea. In 668, Silla unified the three kingdoms, and reigned as Later Silla until 935. The name Samhan became synonymous with the Three Kingdoms of Korea beginning in the 7th century, and by the Goryeo period it became a common name to refer to all of Korea.

The succeeding dynasty called itself Goryeo (Korean: 고려; Hanja: 高麗; MR: Koryŏ), and regarded itself as the successor to Goguryeo (Korean: 고구려; Hanja: 高句麗; MR: Koguryŏ). The name Goryeo was the shortened form of Goguryeo and was first used during the reign of Jangsu in the 5th century. Through the Silk Road trade routes, Persian and Arab merchants brought knowledge about Silla and Goryeo to India and the Middle East. Goryeo was transliterated into Italian as "Cauli", the name Marco Polo used when mentioning the country in his Travels, derived from the Chinese form Gāolí.

In 1392, a new dynasty established by a military coup revived the name Joseon (조선; 朝鮮; Chosŏn), after the ancient state Gojoseon. The alternative name for this nation could have been Hwaryeong, but in the end, Taejo of Joseon decided to go with Joseon. The hanja for Joseon have been translated into English as "morning calm" and sometimes rather as "morning freshness" or "morning radiance" and Korea's English nickname became "The Land of the Morning Calm"; however, this interpretation is not often used in the Korean language, and is more familiar to Koreans as a back-translation from English. Only the interpretation as "morning freshness" is plainly viable, with "morning calm" and "morning radiance" being rather fanciful interpretations. The nickname "Land of the Morning Calm" was coined by Percival Lowell in his book, "Chosön, the Land of the Morning Calm," published in 1885.

In 1897, the nation was renamed Daehan Jeguk (대한제국; 大韓帝國; lit. 'Great Han Empire', known in English as Korean Empire). Han had been selected in reference to Samhan, specifically the Three Kingdoms of Korea, not the ancient confederacies in the southern Korean Peninsula. So, Daehan Jeguk (대한제국; 大韓帝國) means it is an empire that rules the area of Three Kingdoms of Korea. This name was used to emphasize independence of Korea, because an empire cannot be a subordinate country.

=== 20th century ===
When the Korean Empire came under Japanese rule in 1910, the name reverted to Joseon (officially, the Japanese pronunciation Chōsen). During this period, many different groups outside of Korea fought for independence, the most notable being the Daehanminguk Imsi Jeongbu (대한민국 임시정부; 大韓民國臨時政府; lit. 'Provisional Government of the Great Han People's State'), known in English as the Provisional Government of the Republic of Korea (民國 = 民 'people' + 國 country/state' = 'republic' in East Asian capitalist societies). (Note: Actually Republic is 共和國 공화국 ("Mutually peaceful country"), derived from the Gonghe Regency (共和), as can be seen in the names of the People's Republic of China and North Korea but the Republic of China and South Korea coined the latter 民國 민국)

Korea became independent after World War II (1945) and the country was then divided.

In 1948, the South adopted the provisional government's name of Daehanminguk (대한민국; 大韓民國; see above), known in English as the Republic of Korea (ROK). Daehanminguk is sometimes used by South Koreans as a metonym to refer to the Korean nation as a whole, rather than just the South Korean state.

Meanwhile, the North became Chosŏn Minjujuŭi Inmin Konghwaguk (조선민주주의인민공화국; 朝鮮民主主義人民共和國), translated in English as the Democratic People's Republic of Korea (DPRK). Each component of the name was carefully selected. Chosŏn was the natural choice for the short form, "Korea", since it had been used throughout the colonial period to denote the Peninsula. For the long form of the name, Konghwaguk was used for republic because of its leftist connotations over Minguk. North Koreans wanted to adopt something that had already been used in the Eastern Bloc to borrow legitimacy. A choice was presented between a "People's Republic" and a "Democratic Republic", because they had been used in the names of the short-lived Ukrainian People's Republic of Soviets and the Finnish Democratic Republic, respectively. "People's Republic" was favored by Pak Hon-yong of the Communist Party of Korea and it had already been used by the temporary People's Republic of Korea (PRK) formed in Seoul after liberation. "Democratic Republic", on the other hand, was associated with Mao Zedong's concept of New Democracy, which influenced Kim Tu-bong of the New People's Party of Korea. After his party merged with the Workers' Party of North Korea, the concept found its way to Kim Il Sung's parlance. Kim began to speak of a "Democratic People's Republic". This was echoed by what the true authorities of the country, the Soviet Civil Administration, prescribed, albeit in different order: "People's-Democratic Republic" (Russian: Народно-Демократическая Республика). Thus the name of the country became the "Korea(n) Democratic People's Republic" in Korean and "Korean People's-Democratic Republic" in Russian so that both parties could claim that they were behind the coining.

== Current usage ==
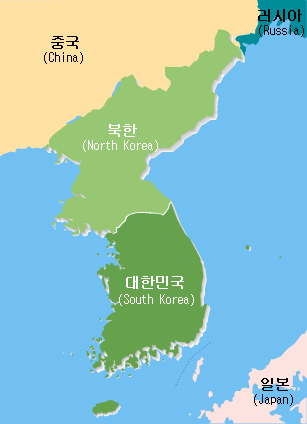
A South Korean map of the Korean Peninsula, using the official Korean name for South Korea and the colloquial South Korean exonym for North Korea. Korea is called Chosŏn (조선; 朝鮮) in North Korea, and Hanguk (한국; 韓國) in South Korea.

=== East Asia ===
==== Korea ====
Today, South Koreans use Hanguk (한국, 韓國) to refer to just South Korea or Korea as a whole, Namhan (남한, 南韓; "South Han") for South Korea, and Bukhan (북한, 北韓; "North Han") for North Korea. South Korea less formally refers to North Korea as Ibuk (이북, 以北; "The North"). South Koreans often refer to Korea as "uri nara" (우리나라), meaning "our nation" or "our country". In addition, the official name for the Republic of Korea in the Korean language is "Daehanminguk" (대한민국, 大韓民國; which is usually translated as "The Republic of Korea").

North Koreans use Chosŏn, Namjosŏn (남조선, 南朝鮮; "South Chosŏn"), and Pukchosŏn (북조선, 北朝鮮; "North Chosŏn") when referring to Korea, South Korea, and North Korea, respectively. The term Pukchosŏn, however, is rarely used in the north, although it may be found in pre-war sources, such as the Song of General Kim Il Sung. In the 1970s, Kim Il Sung suggested that in the event of a North Korean takeover of South Korea, "Koryo" (Korean: 고려) could become the Korean name of the country. Starting from January 2024, after North Korean leader Kim Jong Un stopped pursuing reunification, North Korea started referring to South Korea as Hanguk and Daehanminguk instead of Namjosŏn.

In the tourist regions of North Korea and during official meetings between South Korea and North Korea, Namcheuk (남측, 南側) and Bukcheuk (북측, 北側), or "southern side" and "northern side", are used instead of Hanguk and Bukhan.

The Korean language is called Hangugeo (한국어, 韓國語, referring to the Korean language) or Hangungmal (한국말, 韓國말, referring to spoken Korean only) in the South and Chosŏnŏ (조선어, 朝鮮語) or Chosŏnmal (조선말, 朝鮮말) in the North. The Korean script is called hangeul (한글) in South Korea and Chosŏn'gŭl (조선글) in North Korea. The Korean Peninsula is called Hanbando (한반도, 韓半島) in the South and Chosŏn Bando (조선반도, 朝鮮半島) in the North.

==== Chinese-speaking areas ====
In Chinese-speaking areas such as China, Hong Kong, Macau, Taiwan and Singapore, different naming conventions on several terms have been practiced according to their political proximity to whichever Korean government although there is a growing trend for convergence.

In the Chinese language, the Korean Peninsula is usually called Cháoxiǎn Bàndǎo (simplified Chinese: 朝鲜半岛; traditional Chinese: 朝鮮半島) and in rare cases called Hán Bàndǎo (simplified Chinese: 韩半岛; traditional Chinese: 韓半島). Ethnic Koreans are also called Cháoxiǎnzú (朝鲜族), instead of Dàhán mínzú (大韓民族). However, the term Hánguó ren (韩国人) may be used to specifically refer to South Koreans.

Before establishing diplomatic relations with South Korea, the People's Republic of China tended to use the historic Korean name Cháoxiǎn (朝鲜 "Joseon" or "Chosŏn"), by referring to South Korea as Nán Cháoxiǎn (南朝鲜 "South Joseon"). Since diplomatic ties were restored, China has used the names that each of the two sides prefer, by referring to North Korea as Cháoxiǎn and to South Korea as Hánguó (韩国 "Hanguk"). The Korean language can be referred to as either Cháoxiǎnyǔ (朝鲜语) or Hánguóyǔ (韩国语). The Korean War is officially called the Kàngměi Yuáncháo Zhànzhēng (抗美援朝战争 "War to Resist America and Aid Joseon [i.e. Korea]") although the term Cháoxiǎn Zhànzhēng (朝鲜战争 "Joseon War" i.e. "Korean War") is also used in unofficial contexts.

Taiwan, on the other hand, uses the South Korean names, referring to North Korean as Běihán (北韓 "North Han") and South Korean as Nánhán (南韓 "South Han"). The Republic of China previously maintained diplomatic relations with South Korea, but has never had relations with North Korea. As a result, in the past, Hánguó (韓國) had been used to refer to the whole Korea, and Taiwanese textbooks treated Korea as a unified nation. The Ministry of Foreign Affairs of the Republic of China under the Democratic Progressive Party Government considered North and South Koreas two separate countries. However, general usage in Taiwan is still to refer to North Korea as Běihán (北韓 "North Han[guk]") and South Korea as Nánhán (南韓 "South Han[guk]") while use of 朝鮮 – which in Taiwan is not pronounced Cháoxiǎn but Cháoxiān – is generally limited to ancient Korea. The Korean language is usually referred to as Hányǔ (韓語).

Similarly, general usage in Hong Kong and Macau has traditionally referred to North Korea as Bak Hon (北韓 "North Han") and South Korea as Nam Hon (南韓 "South Han"). Under the influence of official usage, which is itself influenced by the official usage of the People's Republic of China government, the mainland practice of naming the two Koreas differently has become more common.

In the Chinese language used in Singapore and Malaysia, North Korea is usually called Cháoxiǎn (朝鲜 "Chosŏn") with Běi Cháoxiǎn (北朝鲜 "North Chosŏn") and Běihán (北韩 "North Han") less often used, while South Korea is usually called Hánguó (韩国 "Hanguk") with Nánhán (南韩 "South Han[guk]") and Nán Cháoxiǎn (南朝鲜 "South Chosŏn") less often used.

In Hokkien speaking areas of Chinese communities in places like Taiwan and around Southeast Asia, Korea is called Hân-kok (韓國 "Hanguk") where North Korea is referred to as Pak-hân (北韓 "North Han") and South Korea as Lâm-hân (南韓 "South Han").

The above usage pattern does not apply for Korea-derived words. For example, Korean ginseng is commonly called Gāolì shēn (高麗參, "Koryo ginseng").

==== Japan ====
In Japan, North Korea is called Kita-Chōsen (北朝鮮) and South Korea Kankoku (韓国).

However, Japan-based Koreans aligned with North Korea claim the name Kita-Chōsen is derogatory, as it only refers to the northern part of Korean Peninsula, whereas the government used to claim sovereignty over its whole territory. Pro-North organisations, such as the Chongryon, use the name Kyōwakoku (共和国; "the Republic") instead, but the ambiguous name is not popular among others. In 1972, Chongryon campaigned to get the Japanese media to stop referring to North Korea as Kita-Chōsen. This effort was not successful, but as a compromise most media companies agreed to refer to the nation with its full official title at least once in every article, thus they used the lengthy Kita-Chōsen (Chōsen Minshu-shugi Jinmin Kyōwakoku) (北朝鮮(朝鮮民主主義人民共和国); "North Korea (Democratic People's Republic of Korea)"). By January 2003, this policy started to be abandoned by most newspapers, starting with Tokyo Shimbun, which announced that it would no longer write out the full name, followed by Asahi, Mainichi, and Nikkei.

For Korea as a whole, Chōsen (朝鮮 "Joseon"; historically annotated as テウセン Teusen, which should have been pronounced most often as *[ʨjeu.ɕjeɴ]) is commonly used. The term Chōsen, which has a longer usage history than Kankoku, continues to be used to refer to the Korean Peninsula, the Korean ethnic group, and the Korean language, which are use cases that would not cause confusion between South Korea and North Korea. When referring to both North Korean and South Koreans, the transcription of phonetic English Korean (コリアン, Korian) may be used because a reference to a Chōsen national may be interpreted as referring specifically to a North Korean national.

The Korean language is most frequently referred to in Japan as Kankokugo (韓国語) or Chōsengo (朝鮮語). While academia mostly prefers Chōsengo, Kankokugo became more and more common in non-academic fields, thanks to the economic and cultural presence of South Korea. The language is also referred to as various combined terms, such as Kankoku-Chōsen-go (韓国朝鮮語), Chōsen-Kankoku-go (朝鮮・韓国語), "Kankokugo (Chōsengo)" (韓国語(朝鮮語)), etc. Some people refer to the language as Koriago (コリア語), using the European name for Korea. This term is not used in ordinary Japanese, but was selected as a compromise to placate both nations in a euphemistic process called kotobagari. Likewise, when NHK broadcasts a language instruction program for Korean, the language is referred to as hangurugo (ハングル語; "hangul language"); although it is technically incorrect since hangul itself is a writing system, not a language. (Note: In the program, however, teachers avoid the name Hangurugo, by always saying this language. They would say, for instance, "In this language, Annyeong haseyo means Hello.") Some argue that even Hangurugo is not completely neutral, since North Korea calls the writing system Chosŏn'gŭl, not hangul. Urimaru (ウリマル), a direct transcription of uri mal (우리말, "our language") is sometimes used by Korean residents in Japan, as well as by KBS World Radio. This term, however, may not be suitable to ethnic Japanese whose "our language" is not necessarily Korean.

Uri (우리 "we/us/our") is the first-person plural pronoun and it is commonly used as a prefix in Korean terms to describe things that are Korean, such as uri nara (우리나라, "our country") which is yet another name Koreans give their country.

In Japan, those who moved to Japan usually maintain their distinctive cultural heritages (such as the Baekje-towns or Goguryeo-villages). Ethnic Korean residents of Japan have been collectively called Zainichi Chōsenjin (在日朝鮮人 "Joseon People in Japan"), regardless of nationality. However, for the same reason as above, the euphemism Zainichi Korian (在日コリアン; "Koreans in Japan") is increasingly used today. Zainichi (在日; "In Japan") itself is also often used colloquially. People with North Korean nationality are called Zainichi Chōsenjin, while those with South Korean nationality, sometimes including recent newcomers, are called Zainichi Kankokujin (在日韓国人 "Hanguk People in Japan").

==== Mongolia ====
Mongolian people have their own word for Korea: Солонгос (Solongos). In Mongolian, solongo may mean either "rainbow" or "mountain weasel (Mustela altaica, heeriyn solongo "field/steppe solongo") or Siberian weasel (Mustela sibirica, oyn solongo "forest solongo")." Another theory states that the name is probably derived from the Solon tribe living in Manchuria, a tribe culturally and ethnically related to the Korean people. North and South Korea are, accordingly, Хойд Солонгос (Hoid Solongos) and Өмнөд Солонгос (Ömnöd Solongos). The authors of an article published in 2023 have related Mongolian Solongos for "Korea" to the Mongolic word *solagaï (cf. Khalkh Mongolian солгой "left-handed, a lefty; out of tune, sounding wrong"), which may in turn be from Turkic *sōl "left."; because "left" also means "east(ern)" in Mongolic languages (whereas "right" also means "west(ern)"), the authors suggest that this word may have been used to refer to "a foreign enemy force in the east," similar to Chinese 東夷 Dōngyí.

The name of either Silla or its capital Seora-beol was also widely used throughout Northeast Asia as the ethnonym for the people of Silla, appearing [...] as Solgo or Solho in the language of the medieval Jurchens and their later descendants, the Manchus respectively. The plural of Solho ("Korea, Korean; a Korean") in the Manchu language is Solhoso ("Koreans, Korean people"), similar to Solongos in Mongolian. Manchu also has solohi or silihi for certain kinds of weasel (specifically, suwayan solohi "yellow solohi" for Mustela sibirica), but nioron for "rainbow."

The Mongolian and Manchu names for Korea and Koreans also resemble Old Japanese Siraki ~ Siragi ("Silla") and Old Korean *Syerapeur "Gyeongju; capital city of Silla" > Late Middle Korean Syeveulh "capital city (of Joseon)" > Modern Korean Seoul "capital city (of South Korea)."

==== Vietnamese-speaking areas ====
In Vietnam, people call North Korea Triều Tiên (朝鮮; "Chosŏn") and South Korea Hàn Quốc (韓國; "Hanguk"). Prior to unification, North Vietnam used Bắc Triều Tiên (北朝鮮; Bukchosŏn) and Nam Triều Tiên (南朝鮮; Namjoseon) while South Vietnam used Bắc Hàn (北韓; Bukhan) and Nam Hàn (南韓; Namhan) for North and South Korea, respectively. After unification, the northern Vietnamese terminology persisted until the 1990s. When South Korea reestablished diplomatic relations with Vietnam in 1993, it requested that Vietnam use the name that it uses for itself, and Hàn Quốc gradually replaced Nam Triều Tiên in usage.

In the Vietnamese language used in the United States, Canada, Australia, and other (pro-)Western countries, Bắc Hàn and Nam Hàn remain in use and are most commonly used, since most of Vietnamese diaspora there were from southern Vietnam area.

=== Outside East Asia ===
==== English usage and spelling ====
Both South and North Korea use the name "Korea" when referring to their countries in English. North Korea is sometimes referred to as "Democratic People's Republic of Korea" (DPRK) and South Korea is sometimes referred to as the "Republic of Korea" (ROK). The official names of both entities are also used by organizations such as United Nations, International Olympic Committee and media such as the Associated Press, China Global Television Network (CGTN), and several others.

As with other European languages, "Corée" in French, for example, English historically had a variety of names for Korea. These included "Cauli" (Marco Polo's rendering of Goryeo), Caule, Core, Cory, Caoli, and Corai as well as two spellings that survived into the 19th century, Corea and Korea. The modern spelling, "Korea", first appeared in the late 17th century in the travel writings of the Dutch East India Company's Hendrick Hamel. The terms "Chosunese" or "Chosonese" were first used to refer to the people of Joseon in the late 19th century but were eventually phased out.

Both major English-speaking governments in the 19th and 20th centuries (the United States and the United Kingdom and its empire) used both "Korea" and "Corea" until the early part of the period of Japanese occupation. English-language publications in the 19th century generally used the spelling Corea, which was also used at the founding of the UK's embassy in Seoul in 1890. However, at the turn of the century, the then U.S. minister and consul general to Korea, Horace Newton Allen, used "Korea" in his works published on the country. At the official Korean exhibit at the World's Columbian Exhibition in Chicago in 1893 a sign was posted by the Korean Commissioner saying of his country's name that "'Korea' and 'Corea' are both correct, but the former is preferred." This may have had something to do with Allen's influence, as he was heavily involved in the planning and participation of the Korean exhibit at Chicago.

A shift can also be seen in Korea itself, where postage stamps issued in 1884 used the name "Corean Post" in English, but those from 1885 and thereafter used "Korea" or "Korean Post".

Names of Korea on 19th century Korean stamps

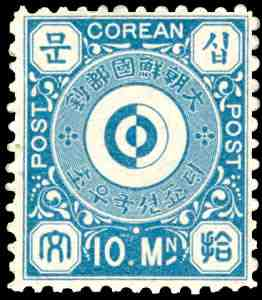
1884 stamp reading "Corean Post"

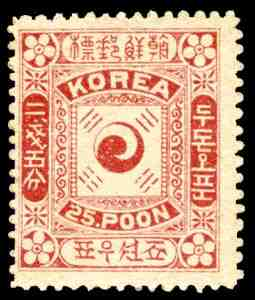
1885 stamp reading "Korea"

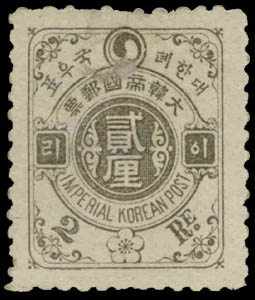
1900 stamp reading "Imperial Korean Post"

By the first two decades of the 20th century, "Korea" began to be seen more frequently than "Corea" – a change that coincided with Japan's consolidation of its grip over the peninsula. However, the spelling "Corea" was occasionally used even under full colonial rule and both it and "Korea" were largely eschewed in favor of the Japanese-derived "Chosen", which itself was derived from "Joseon".

A theory that grew in popularity in South Korea in the early 2000s and especially during the 2002 joint World Cup (and endorsed by the North Korean state) was that Japan as occupier had intentionally standardized the spelling on "Korea", allegedly so that "Japan" would appear first alphabetically. However, evidence of a deliberate name change orchestrated by Japanese authorities is circumstantial, for example, a 1912 memoir by a Japanese colonial official that complained of the Koreans' tendency "to maintain they are an independent country by insisting on using a C to write their country's name."

==== Other languages ====
European languages use variations of the name "Korea" for both North and South Korea. In general, Celtic and Romance languages spell it "Corea" (or variations) since "c" represents the /k/ sound in most Romance and Celtic orthographies. However, languages that have a general preference towards representing /k/ with "k" rather than "c", such as most Germanic or Slavic languages, generally use variants of "Korea" instead. In languages using other alphabets such as Russian (Cyrillic), variations phonetically similar to "Korea" are also used for example the Russian name for Korea is Корея, romanization Koreya or Koreja. Outside of Europe, most languages also use variants of "Korea", often adopted to local orthographies. Some Languages, especially Romance Languages like Portuguese, French and Spanish use spellings that start with "c": Coreia, Corée and Corea respectively. "Korea" in the Jurchen Jin's national language (Jurchen) is "Sogo". "Korea" in the conlang Esperanto is "Koreio". "Korea" in Hmong is "Kauslim" ("s" and "m" represent tones, not consonants).

=== Koreans abroad ===
Emigrants who moved to Russia and Central Asia call themselves Goryeoin or Koryo-saram (고려인; 高麗人; lit. 'person or people of Goryeo'), or Koreytsi (корейцы) in Russian. Many Goryeoin are living in the CIS, including an estimated 106,852 in Russia, 22,000 in Uzbekistan, 20,000 in Kyrgyzstan, 17,460 in Kazakhstan, 8,669 in Ukraine, 2,000 in Belarus, 350 in Moldova, 250 in Georgia, 100 in Azerbaijan, and 30 in Armenia. As of 2005, there are also 1.9 million ethnic Koreans living in China who hold Chinese citizenship and a further 560,000 Korean expatriates from both North and South living in China.

South Korean expatriates living in the U.S. may refer to themselves as jaemi gyopo (재미교포; 在美僑胞; lit. 'residents of America'), or "gyopo" for short.

== Sobriquets of Korea ==
In traditional Korean culture, as well as in the cultural tradition of East Asia, the land of Korea has assumed a number of sobriquets over the centuries, including:

- 계림 (鷄林) Gyerim, "Rooster Forest", in reference to an early name for Silla.
- 군자지국 (君子之國) Gunjajiguk, or "Land of Scholarly Gentlemen".
- 금수강산 (錦繡江山) Geumsu Gangsan, "Land of Embroidered (or Splendid) Rivers and Mountains".
- 단국 (檀國) Danguk, "Country of Dangun".
- 대동 (大東) Daedong, "Great East".
- 동국 (東國) Dongguk, "Eastern Country".
- 동방 (東邦) Dongbang, literally "an Eastern Country" referring to Korea.
- 동방예의지국 (東方禮義之國, 東方禮儀之國) Dongbang yeuijiguk, "Eastern Country of Courtesy".
- 동야 (東野) Dongya, "Eastern Plains".
- 동이 (東夷) Dong-i, "Eastern Foreigners".
- 구이 (九夷) Gu-i, "Nine-i", refers to ancient tribes in the Korean peninsula.
- 동토 (東土) Dongto, "Eastern Land".
- 백의민족 (白衣民族) Baeguiminjok, "The white-clad race".
- 삼천리 (三千里) Samcheolli, "Three thousand li", a reference to the length traditionally attributed to the country from its northern to southern tips plus eastern to western tips.
- 아사달 (阿斯達) Asadal, apparently an Old Korean term for Joseon.
- 청구 (靑丘) Cheonggu, or "Azure Hills". The color Azure is associated with the East.
- 팔도강산 (八道江山) Paldo Gangsan, "Rivers and Mountains of the Eight Provinces", referring to the traditional eight provinces of Korea.
- 근화향 (槿花鄕) Geunhwahyang, "Country of Mugunghwa" refer to Silla Kingdom.
- 근역 (槿域) Geunyeok, "Hibiscus Territory", or Land of Hibiscus
- 삼한 (三韓) Samhan, or "Three Hans", refers to Samhan confederacy that ruled Southern Korea. Beginning in the 7th century, Samhan became synonymous with the Three Kingdoms of Korea.
- 해동 (海東) Haedong, "East of the Sea" (here being the West Sea separating from Korea).
- 해동삼국 (海東三國) Haedong Samguk, "Three Kingdoms East of the Sea" refers to Three Kingdoms of Korea
- 해동성국 (海東盛國) Haedong Seongguk, literally "Flourishing Eastern Sea Country", historically refers to Balhae Kingdom of north–south period.
- 진국 (震國,振國) Jinguk, "Shock Country", old name of Balhae Kingdom.
- 진역 (震域) Jinyeok, "Eastern Domain".
- 진단 (震檀,震壇) Jindan, "Eastern Country of Dangun".
- 진국 (辰國) Jinguk, "Country of Early Morning", refer to the Jin state of Gojoseon period.

== See also ==
- History of Korea
- Romanization of Korean

== Notes ==
By ISO 639-3 code
Enter an ISO code to find the corresponding language article.
