= Dangun (disambiguation) =

Dangun was the legendary founder of Gojoseon.

Dangun may also refer to:

- Dan-Gun, a teul in Taekwon-Do
- Yi Dangun, a VPN-magnate and claimant to head of the house of Joseon

== See also ==
- Dangun Feveron, a video game
- Dangun years in the Korean calendar
- List of Korean monarchs
