= Tales from the Green Hills =

Series of Korean tales (c. 19th century)

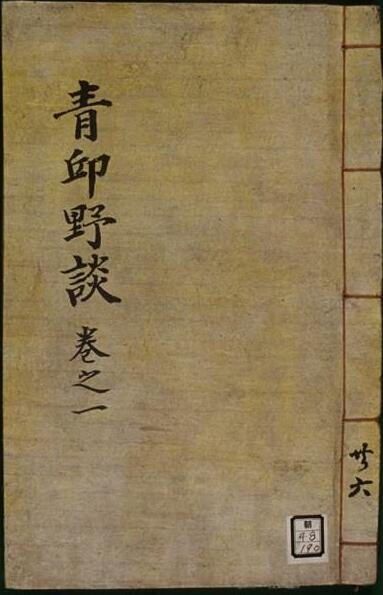
Front cover of the Cheonggu yadam

Cheonggu yadam (靑邱野談; Tales from the Green Hills) is a collection of Korean stories from the late Joseon dynasty collected by an unknown editor.

The first two Chinese characters in the title, Cheonggu, literally meant "green hills" and was another name for Korea. The last two Chinese characters of the title, yadam (野談), refer to relatively short stories that were enjoyed in the men's quarters of a household during the Joseon Dynasty.

The book has been subject to a number of scholarly analyses.

== Overview ==
=== Origin ===
While it is estimated that Cheonggu yadam was written during the 19th century, the author is unknown. There are theories, however, that Kim Kyeong-jin (金敬鎭), a vassal of the late Joseon period, is responsible for publishing the stories.

=== Content ===
Because Cheonggu yadam comprises so many diverse stories, it is hard to summarize the entire collection. But in general, the stories can be divided into three main categories: stories about gaining riches, stories about love between a man and a woman, and stories about individuals who are social pariahs or have questionable character.

Yeongsaneopbuburibang (營産業夫婦異房 A Couple Who Slept in Separate Rooms to Gain Riches) is one example of a story about gaining riches. In the story, a poor old bachelor named Kim gets married, and on the first night of their marriage, he and his wife resolve to become rich. Thinking that they will never become rich if they have a child now, the couple spend ten years sleeping in separate rooms. They devote themselves to farming and eventually become extremely rich. While it might seem somewhat cold that a couple would sleep in separate rooms for 10 years just to get rich, one can also read in this story the strong desire by the people of that time to find fortune and escape poverty.

Gwonsamunpiubonggiyeon (權斯文避雨逢奇緣 Avoiding the Rain, and Having an Odd Connection) is one example of a story about love between a man and a woman. In this story, a man named Kwon hides from the rain under the eaves of a random house then becomes intimate with the young widow living in the house. Later, the reader finds out that the young widow's father-in-law orchestrated the encounter because he pitied the plight of the young widow, who knew nothing of the sexual union of men and women. Although the Joseon Dynasty is famous for its strong feudalistic moral code, this story shows that, at the same time, sexual desires were accepted as essential and normal.

Eosojangtoaseolbugaek (語消長偸兒說富客 The Rich Man of Yeongnam Who Was Robbed) is one example of a story about a social pariah or individual of questionable character. In this story, a wealthy man of Yeongnam is looking for the opportunity to become connected with an influential family from Seoul and move up in the world. Then one day, the leader of a band of thieves of Weolchuldo pretends to be the nephew of a government official and asks to spend the night, and the rich man gladly welcomes the thief into his home. That night, while kindly advising the rich man that his efforts to become affiliated with a family of influence are in vain, the thief steals all of the rich man's fortune. From this depiction of the thief as a valiant hero, the reader can sense that the work takes a negative and critical view of corrupt government officials and the immoral rich people.

=== Characteristics and Significance ===
While Cheonggu yadam is written in Hanmun, or Chinese characters, the sentences are plain and frequently use Korean proverbs and Korean vocabulary. In addition to this, because the subject matter of the stories is generally intimately concerned with life at the time, it is possible to understand the dynamic lives of the people who lived at the time these stories were written.

In particular, along with Lee Hui-jun's Gyeseo yadam (溪西野談 Tales from Gyeseo) and Lee Won-myeong's Dongyahuijib (東野彙輯 Tales from the Eastern Plains), Cheonggu yadam is considered as one of the three most important collections of yadam of the Joseon Dynasty. This is because the yadam recorded in Cheonggu yadam are not only numerous, but literary as well.

== Editions ==
There are 17 editions of Cheonggu yadam. Included below are the main editions for Cheonggu yadam. Of these editions, the Cheonggu yadam held at University of California, Berkeley has the most entries and is the most complete.

- University of California, Berkeley: 10 volumes, 10 books, 290 stories
- Kyujanggak (Hangeul Version): 19 volumes, 10 books, 262 stories
- Dongyangmungo: 8 volumes, 8 books, 266 stories
- Seoul National University Old Books Collection: 5 volumes, 5 books, 217 stories
