= Kingdom of the Sun =

Kingdom of the Sun may refer to:

- Inca Empire
- Ancient Egypt
- Kingdom of the Sun (film), the working title of the 2000 film The Emperor's New Groove

== See also ==
- Empire of the Sun (disambiguation)
- King of the Sun, an album by The Saints
- Kings of the Sun, a 1963 film
- Kings of the Sun (band), an Australian hard rock band
