= Fusang =

Poetic name for a mythical island east of China

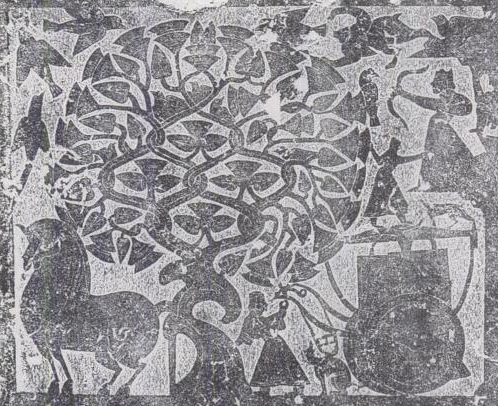
- The fusang tree as depicted in a rubbing from the Wu Liang Shrine reliefs, mid-2nd cent.
- Chinese: 扶桑
Transcriptions
Standard Mandarin
- Hanyu Pinyin: Fúsāng
- Wade–Giles: Fu-sang

Fusang is a mythical world tree or place located far east of China.

In the Classic of Mountains and Seas and several contemporary texts, the term refers to a mythological tree of life, alternatively identified as a mulberry or a hibiscus, allegedly growing far to the east of China, and perhaps to various more concrete territories which are located to the east of the mainland.

A country which was named Fusang was described by the native Buddhist missionary Huishen (慧深, Huìshēn), also variously romanized as Hui Shen, Hoei-sin, and Hwai Shan. In his record, dated to AD 499, during China's Northern and Southern dynastic period, he describes Fusang as a place which is located 20,000 Chinese li to the east of Dahan, and it is also located to the east of China (according to Joseph Needham, Dahan corresponds to the Buriat region of Siberia). Huishen arrived in China from Kabul in 450 AD and went by ship to Fusang in 458 AD, and upon his return in 499 reported his findings to the Liang emperor. His descriptions are recorded in the 7th-century text Book of Liang by Yao Silian, and they describe a civilization which inhabits the Fusang country. The Fusang which is described by Huishen has variously been posited to be the Americas, Sakhalin Island, the Kamchatka Peninsula or the Kuril Islands. The American hypothesis was the most hotly debated one during the late 19th and early 20th centuries, after the 18th-century writings of Joseph de Guignes were republished and disseminated by Charles Godfrey Leland in 1875. Sinologists, including Emil Bretschneider, Berthold Laufer, and Henri Cordier, refuted this hypothesis, however, and according to Needham, the American hypothesis was all but refuted by the time of the First World War.

In later Chinese accounts, other, even less well-identified places were given the name Fusang.

== Mythological accounts ==
An earlier account claims that in 219 BC, emperor Shi Huang sent an expedition of some 3,000 convicts to a place which was located far off to the east, across the ocean, a place which was called Fusang, where they were required to make a sacrifice to a volcano god who held the elixir of life. Apparently, two expeditions were undertaken by Xu Fu, the court sorcerer, in order to seek the elixir of life. The first expedition returned c. 210 BC because Xu Fu claimed that a giant sea creature was blocking his men's path. Archers were then sent to kill this monster when the expedition set out a second time, but it was never heard from again. However, "... asides in the Record of the Historian imply that its leader Xu Fu had returned to China long ago and was lurking somewhere near Langya, frittering away the expedition's impressive budget."

In Chinese mythology, Fusang refers to a divine tree and an island which are both located in the East, from where the sun rises. A similar tree, known as the Ruomu (若木) exists in the west, and each morning, the sun was said to rise in Fusang and fall on Ruomu. According to Chinese legends, ten birds (typically ravens) lived in the tree, and because nine of the birds rested, the tenth bird would carry the Sun on its journey. This legend has similarities with the Chinese tale of the fictional hero Houyi, sometimes referred to as the Archer, who is credited with saving the world by shooting down nine of the suns when all ten suns simultaneously took to the air one day. Some scholars have identified the bronze trees which were found at the archaeological site Sanxingdui as these Fusang trees.

== Interpretations of Huishen's account ==
=== Eastern Japan ===
Japan was one of the interpretation place for Fusang. However, Huishen's report differentiates Fusang from the ancient Japanese kingdom of Wa, which has been tentatively located in the Kinki, Kyūshū, or it has been located on the Ryukyu Islands.

For historical context, the earliest account of East Asian history referring to Japan as "Fusang" is found in an epitaph of a Paekche individual named Yegun (禰軍; 예군) created in 678.

『日本餘噍 據扶桑以逋誅』

"The refugees of Ilbon (日本; referring to Paekche) safely retreated with the help of Busang Kingdom (扶桑; referring to Japan) from the invaders (Silla–Tang alliance)."

— Excerpt from "Yegun's Epithaph", 678 CE

According to Chinese historian Lianlong Wang (王連龍), the characters of "日本" are referring to the kingdom of Paekche as Japan was referred to as Busang Kingdom (扶桑國). Historically, "Busang (Fusang) Kingdom" was reserved for the "farthest east kingdom" depending on the nation that used it (i.e. Korea was a "Fusang Kingdom" from China's perspective) similar to Cheonggu/Qingqiu. However, since the individual was Korean, "Busang Kingdom" in the context of his epitaph was directing it towards Japan (then Yamato Kingship) as the kingdom of Japan was farthest east from Korea's perspective, while Ilbon (日本; 일본) was dedicated to Paekche, his home nation. Japanese historian Haruyuki Tono (東野 治之) also made a similar conclusion, stating that the term Nippon (日本; にっぽん) originally meant "Paekche" before being adopted by the Japanese.

The term Fusang would later be used as a designation for 'Japan' in Chinese poetry. Since Japanese name Nihon (日本, lit. 'Root [i.e. source, birthplace, origin] of the Sun') or the Chinese name Riben was a name of Japan, some Tang dynasty poets believed that Fusang "lay between the mainland and Japan." For instance, Wang Wei wrote a 753 farewell poem when Abe no Nakamaro (Chinese Zhao Heng 晁衡) returned to Japan, "The trees of your home are beyond Fu-sang."

Fusang is pronounced Fusō in Japanese, from classical Fusau, and it is one of the names which is used as a designation for ancient Japan. Several warships of the Imperial Japanese Navy were named Fusō (the Japanese ironclad warship Fusō, or the World War II battleship Fusō). Several companies, such as Fuso, also bear the name.

Gustaaf Schlegel believed that Fusang was most probably "the long island of Karafuto or it was Sakhalin". Joseph Needham added that "if Kamchatka and the Kuriles may also be considered, there is no better means of identifying it at the present day."

Note that there was an ancient province of Japan which was named the Fusa-no kuni (the 'Country of Fusa') in eastern Honshū, which encompassed all of the modern-day Chiba Prefecture as well as the southwestern part of the modern-day Ibaraki Prefecture.

=== The Americas ===
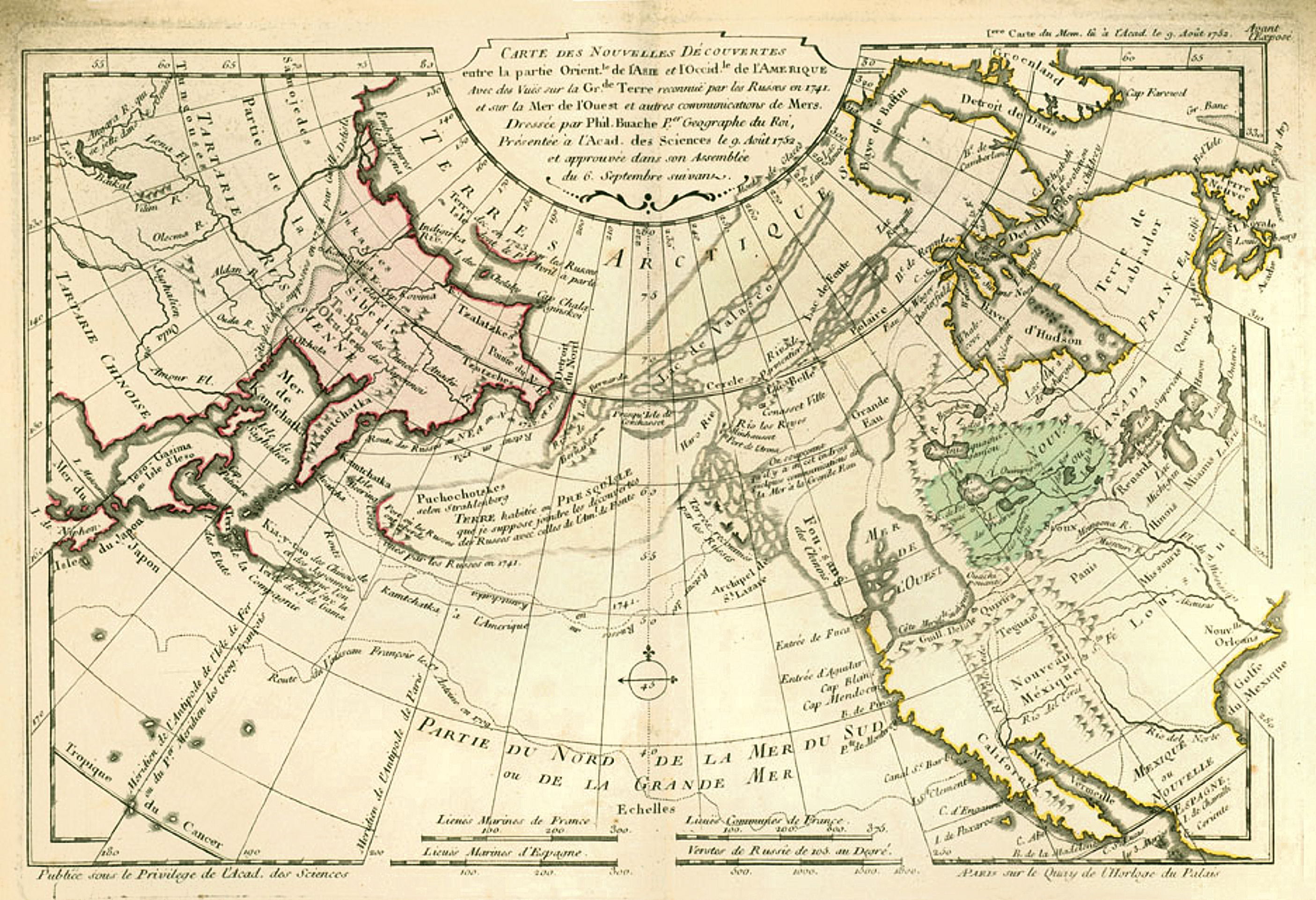
This 1753 map by the French cartographer Philippe Buache locates Fusang ("Fou-sang des Chinois", 'Fusang of the Chinese') north of California, in the area of British Columbia.

According to some historians such as Charles Godfrey Leland and Joseph de Guignes (Le Fou-Sang des Chinois est-il l'Amérique? Mémoires de l'Académie des Inscriptions et Belles Lettres, tome 28, Paris, 1761), the distances which are given by Huishen (20,000 Chinese li) would mean that Fusang is located on the west coast of the American continent, when the ancient Han-period definition of the Chinese li is taken into account. Some 18th-century European maps locate Fusang north of California, in the area of British Columbia. An American location does not match with the claim that horses were sighted (because horses did not exist in either North or South America at that time) nor does it match with the claim that deer were domesticated and milked.

Fusang was mentioned in a map of Marco Polo's voyages to the Far East which was supposedly made (or copied) by his family. The map includes the Kamchatka Peninsula and Alaska. The map has been dated to the 15th or 16th century, which means that at best it is a copy of the original map. However, the ink was not dated, so it is also possible that Alaska could have been added later on when its existence became known.

== Descriptions of Fusang ==
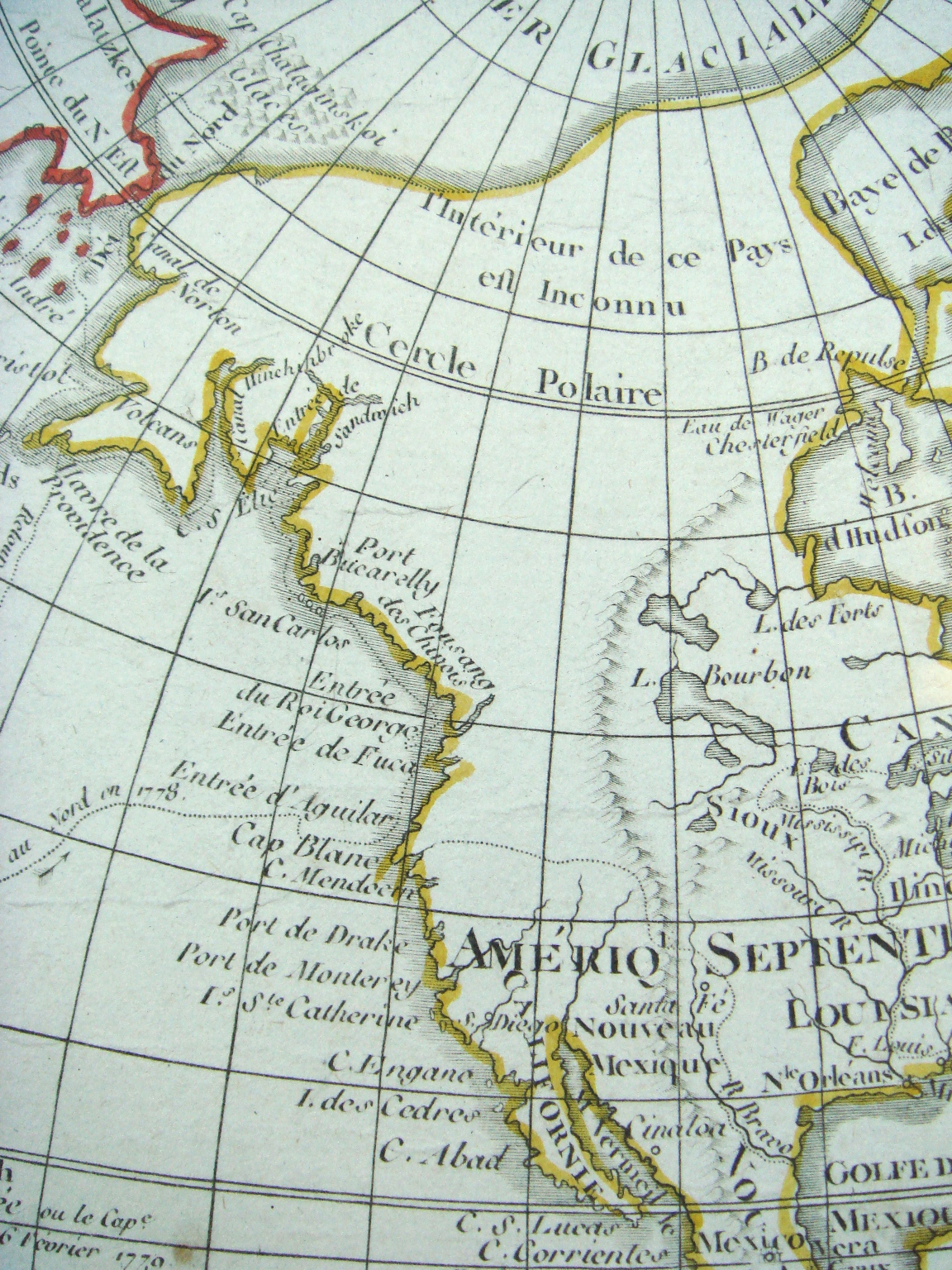
Mention of Fusang ("Fousang des Chinois") on a 1792 French world map, in the area of modern-day British Columbia.

According to the report of Huishen to the Chinese during his visit to China, which is described in the Book of Liang:

Fusang is 20,000 li to the East of the country of Dàhàn (lit. 'Great Han'), and located to the east of China (lit. the 'Middle Kingdom').

On that land, there are many Fusang plants that produce oval-shaped leaves which are similar to paulownia and edible purplish-red fruits which are like pears. The place was rich in copper deposits and it also contained traces of gold and silver but it did not contain iron. The native tribes in Fusang were civilized, living in well-organized communities. They produced paper from the bark of the Fusang plants for writing and they also produced cloth from the fibers of the bark, which they used for robes or wadding. Their houses or cabins were constructed with red mulberry wood. The fruits and young shoots of the plants were one of their food sources. They raised deer for meat and milk, just as the Chinese raised cattle at home, and they also produced cheese with deer's milk. They traveled on horseback and transported their goods with carts or sledges which were pulled by horses, buffalo, or deer.

On the organization of the country:

An emperor, or a main chief, with the help of several officials, governed the country. The majority of the people were law-abiding citizens. The country had no army or military defense but it did have two jails, one jail was located in the north and the other jail was located in the south of the country. Those people who had committed serious crimes were sent to the north and they stayed there for their entire lives. However, these inmates could get married. If they got married and produced children, their sons became slaves and their daughters became maids.

On the social practices:

The marriage arrangement was relatively simple. If a boy wanted to marry a girl, he had to build a cabin next to the home of the girl and stay in it for a year. If the girl liked him, they would get married; otherwise he would be asked to go away ... When a person died in the community, his or her body would be cremated. The mourning period varied from seven days for a dead parent to five days for a dead grandparent and three days for a dead brother or sister. During their mourning periods, the people were not supposed to consume food, they could only drink water. They had no Buddhism.

The Book of Liang also describes the conversion of Fusang to the Buddhist faith by five Buddhist monks who were from Gandhara:

In former times, the people of Fusang knew nothing of the Buddhist religion, but in the second year of Da Ming of the Liu Song dynasty (458 AD), five monks who were from the Kipin (Kabul region of Gandhara) traveled to that country by ship. They propagated the Buddhist doctrine, circulated scriptures and drawings, and advised the people to relinquish their worldly attachments. As a result, the customs of the people of Fusang changed.

== See also ==
- Xu Fu
- Chinese mythology
- Zhou Man
- Pre-Columbian transoceanic contact theories
