= Empire of the Sun =

Empire of the Sun may refer to:

- Empire of the Sun (novel) by J. G. Ballard published in 1984
- Empire of the Sun (film), a film adaptation of the novel
  - Empire of the Sun (soundtrack)
- Empire of the Sun (band), an Australian electronic music duo
- Empire of Japan, due to the kanji characters
- "Empire of the Sun", a short story by Andrew Weiner

== See also (and not to be confused with) ==
- Land of the Rising Sun (disambiguation)
- Kingdom of the Sun (disambiguation)
- The Queendom of Sol, a book series by Wil McCarthy
- The empire on which the sun never sets
- Sun Dynasty
