= Cheonggu =

Chinese exonym for Korea

- Hangul: 청구
- Hanja: 靑丘, 靑邱
- RR: Cheonggu
- MR: Ch'ŏnggu

Cheonggu (Korean: 청구; Hanja: 靑丘, 靑邱) also rendered as Qingqiu in Chinese, was a name given by ancient China to the Korean Peninsula during the Old Chosŏn period to the Three Kingdoms period of Korea.

== Etymology ==
The origin of the name is unknown with many historians speculating that the letter "Cheong" (靑) meaning "azure" or "clear" often alluded to the cardinal direction, east (see Color in Chinese culture) with "Gu" (丘) meaning "hills" or "land". Therefore, the name would have most likely meant "Azure Land" in the east of China.

Another variation of its spelling can be found in Korean historical texts under "靑邱" (Cheonggu/Qingqiu), most likely a way to prevent naming taboo of Confucius, born Kong Qiu (孔丘) which shares the letter "丘" (Qiu/Gu).

== History ==
=== Ancient accounts ===
The first mention of the name "Cheonggu" is found in Shanhaijing (Classic of Mountains and Seas), compiled from the Warring States period to the Western Han period of ancient China. Lüshi Chunqiu also notes that Cheonggu lies in the east of China as a foreign land.

『靑丘國在其北其人食五穀衣絲帛其狐四足九尾。』

"The Land of Blue Hills (Cheonggu) lies to the north where the inhabitants consume the Five Grains, wear silk and worship foxes that have four legs and nine tails."

— Shanhaijing

『亦有青丘國在海外水經云。』

"The foreign Land of Blue Hills (Cheonggu) lies to the east outside the nation (China)."

— Lüshi Chunqiu

Another record found in Shanhaijing claims that Cheonggu was located to the north of "Gunja country (君子國)" meaning "country of the enlightened", a name given by the Chinese to the area of Silla due to its enlightenment in Chinese culture, an allusion to Confucius ideology. Due to the mentioning of it being located in the east of China and above Silla (Gunja), many modern historians suggest that the exact location of Cheonggu to be somewhere in lower Manchuria or just above the Korean Peninsula. Judging by the nuance of the records, it can also be deduced that Cheonggu was not part of China's jurisdiction and was not part of the sino-centric sphere. Some historians have suggested Old Chosŏn (known as simply Joseon in ancient records) as the location of Cheonggu. However, the name of Joseon was introduced separately in the same record and may be considered as a different area.

On the other hand, several sources allude to the inner Korean Peninsula as the location of Cheonggu as evident in the Samguk sagi.

『公大祖{太祖}<中牟王>，积德比{北}山，立切{功}南海，威风振于<靑丘>，仁敎被于<玄>。』

"King Jungmo (Dongmyeong of Goguryeo) had the patience of several mountains, accomplishments that could reach the Namhae seas, a fierce look that was popularized in Cheonggu (Korean peninsula) and intellect that intimidated even the Chinese Xuantu Commandery."

— Samguk Sagi (Book of Silla)

Another evidence within the Chinese record, New Book of Tang mentions Cheonggu where a Tang dynasty general named "Niu Jinda (牛進達)" was given leadership of the Chinese navy for the "Way to Cheonggu (青丘道)" when it declared war on Goguryeo during the rule of Emperor Taizong of Tang.

『左武衛大將軍牛進達為青丘道行軍大總管，李世勣為遼東道行軍大總管，率三總管兵以伐高麗。』

"Niu Jinda was given the position of naval leader of the Way to Cheonggu for the battle against Goguryeo."

— New Book of Tang

As evident in the Goguryeo–Tang War, much of the routes taken by the Tang forces were through the Yellow sea into the inner Korean Peninsula, therefore, it can be deduced that the "Way to Cheonggu" meant this certain vicinity.

Another argument that is now considered a fringe theory is that "靑丘" originally meant the area of present-day Dalian. However, this theory is not academically supported by mainstream scholars.

=== Modern accounts ===
The general consensus is that the initial use of the word "靑丘" did not point to a specific location. Instead, it was used as a general term for anywhere in the east of China which included both Manchuria and the Korean peninsula. Meaning, regardless of its exact location, if it was in the east of China then it was most likely called "Cheonggu/Qingqiu". It was only when the Koreans decided to embrace the name as part of their identity during the Thee Kingdoms period when it became more widely used as a placename for Korea.

== Legacy ==
After adopting and fully embracing the name, Koreans widely used the name "Cheonggu" as part of their identity throughout their history as evident in many of their records recording the peninsula under Cheonggu.

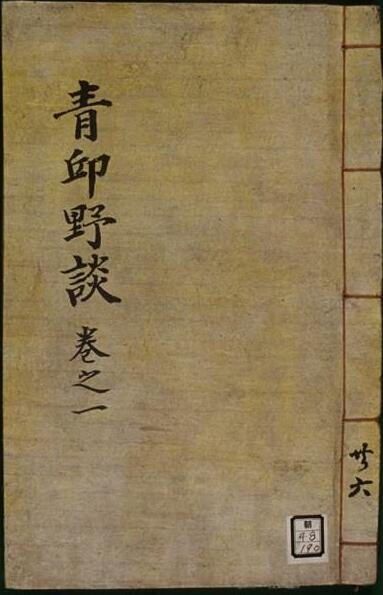
Front cover of the Tales from the Green Hills

The name became a prevalent placename that alluded to the general term for the peninsula. The name was widely used in literature as seen in Tales from the Green Hills (靑邱野談; 청구야담; Cheonggu yadam) of the Joseon dynasty.

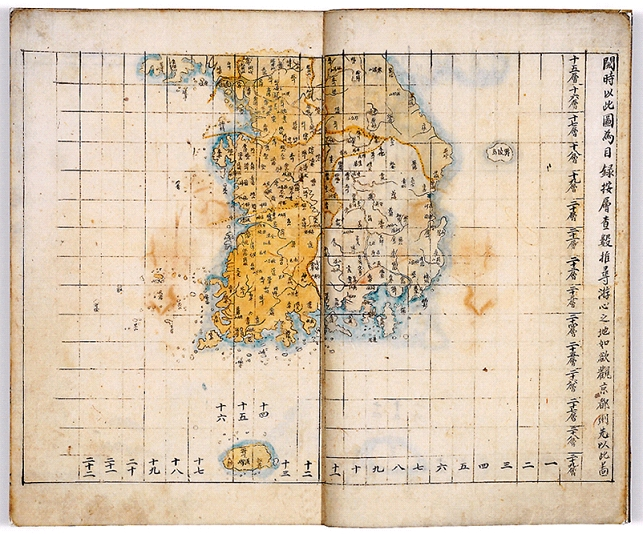
Cheonggudo, a map of the Korean Peninsula (1834)

In maps like the "Cheonggudo [ko] (청구도; 靑邱圖)" include the term to represent the land they were depicting.

It was also used during the Japanese annexation of Korea where a newspaper was published under the same name called Ch'ŏnggu Sinbo.

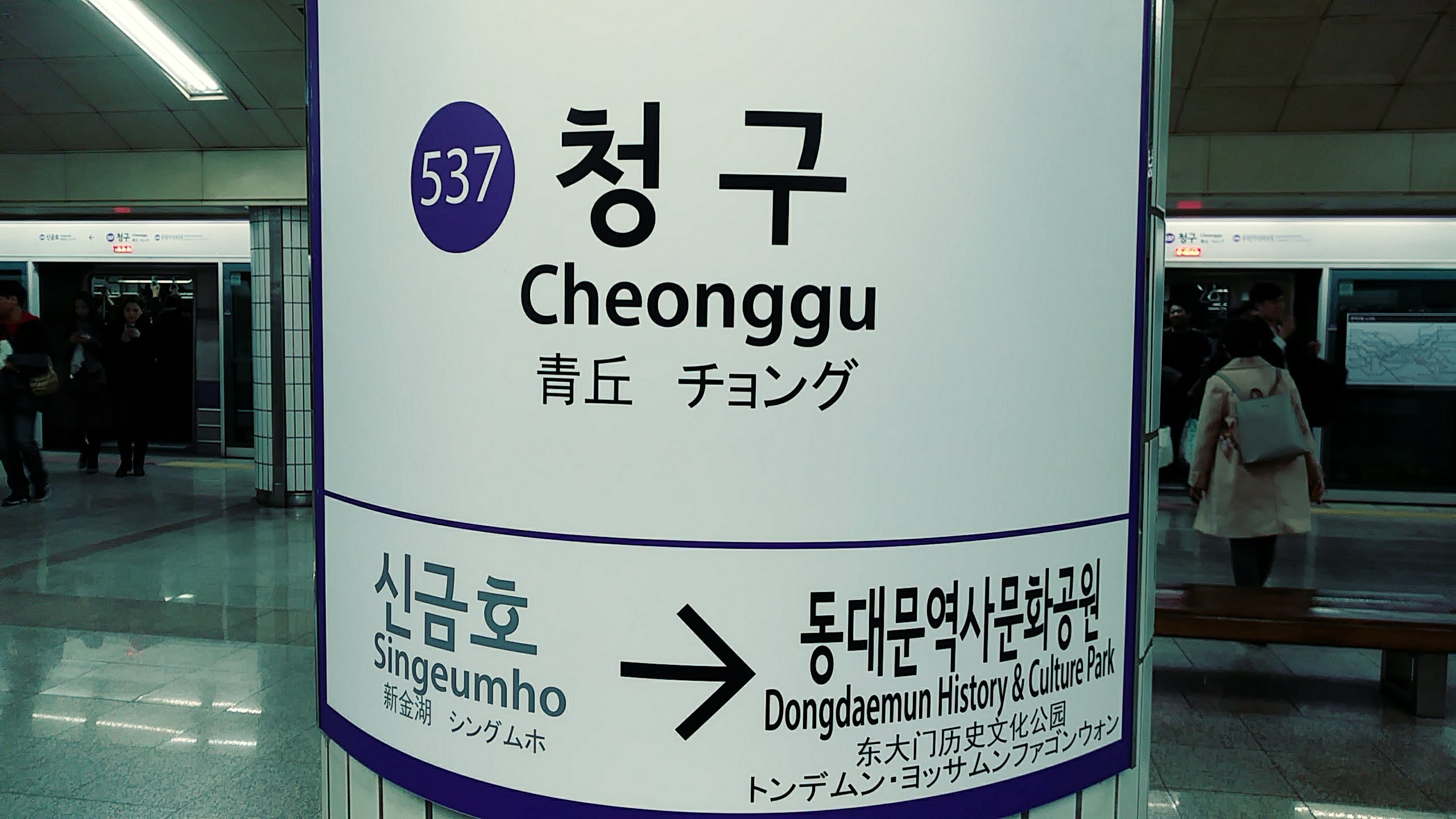
Cheonggu station

In modern Korea, Cheonggu is carried over to names such as Cheonggu station, Cheonggu-dong etc. all sharing the same characters of the ancient placename.

=== Possible connections to Japan ===
The story of fox spirits being worshiped by the inhabitants of Cheonggu might draw connections to Japan as the kami Inari of Shintoism is believed to be a foreign god thought to have been introduced by the Hata clan of Silla. The kami, a deity that looks over foxes, fertility, rice, tea and sake, of agriculture and industry, of general prosperity and worldly success, is believed to have been introduced first in the late fifth century suggested by scholars such as Kazuo Higo as the name "Inari" does not appear in classical Japanese mythology.

In addition, Fushimi Inari-taisha, the same shrine built by the Hata clan and one of the most influential shrines to officially celebrate the god Inari, also stated that the fox deity was most likely not of Japanese origin and had most likely arrived in Japan from the kingdoms of the Korean peninsula. It states that during the Three Kingdoms period, foxes were widely celebrated as gods and were deified as protectors of agriculture and prosperity due to the influence of Buddhism. This sentiment was later carried over to the Japanese archipelago by the Hata clan and other immigrant clans which arrived in Japan in the earlier centuries and was given the name "稲荷 (いなり)" in kanji which means "carrying rice", (literally "rice load") first found in the Ruijū Kokushi in 892 AD.

A Chinese record called Taiping Guangji states that a Taoist scholar, Luo Gongyuan of Tang dynasty encountered a fox spirit that he exorcised to Silla, and instead of killing it, the people of Silla worshiped said spirit.

『羅公遠上前報告說，「這是天狐，不能殺，應該把它流放到東方去。」于是就寫符把它流放到新羅。於是就寫符把它流放到新羅。』

"A Taoist scholar Luo Gongyuan stated that he had not killed a fox spirit disguised as an individual named "Liu Cheng" and he exorcised the spirit to Silla. The people of Silla still worship the spirit to this day."

— Taiping Guangji

A poem by Ch'oe Ch'i-wŏn that was created during the Silla period also euphemizes foxes as mystical beings that represent great beauty.

『狐能化美女。 狸亦作書生。』

"Foxes turn themselves into beautiful women. Leopard cats turn themselves into handsome men."

— Ch'oe Ch'i-wŏn, 古意, excerpt from poem

By cross-referencing Chinese, Korean and Japanese records, it can be deduced that the Korean Peninsula was a place where people worshiped foxes as deities due to native shamanistic and later, Buddhist influence. Hence, why foxes are heavily associated with Cheonggu and other Korean kingdoms such as Silla.

== See also ==
- Fusang - A general placename sometimes referring to Korea, but more commonly Japan, as the "far east kingdom" similar to Cheonggu.
