= Feng Xiaolian =

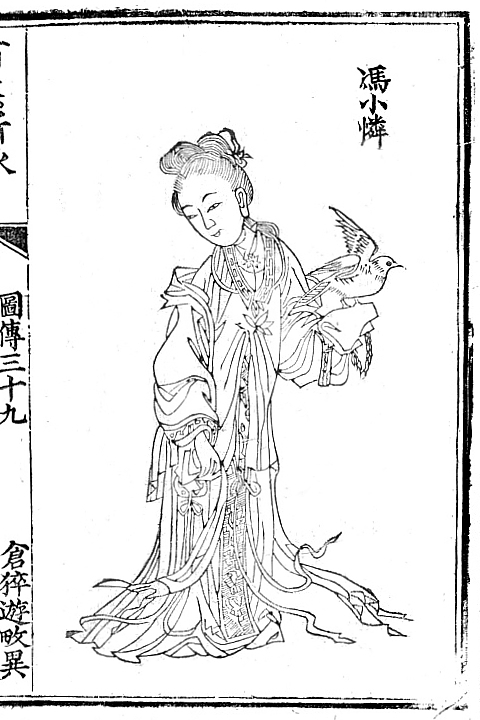
18th century depiction of Feng Xiaolian

Feng Xiaolian (Chinese: 馮小憐; died 581?) was an imperial consort of the Chinese Northern Qi dynasty. She was a concubine of the penultimate emperor Gao Wei, and his infatuation with her caused her to be, fairly or unfairly, often stated by traditional historians as a reason for Northern Qi's downfall.

== Background ==
Feng Xiaolian was initially a servant girl of Gao Wei's third wife Empress Mu. Empress Mu was the adopted daughter of Gao Wei's wet nurse, Lu Lingxuan, and was rivals with another consort, Consort Cao. Consort Cao was skilled at the pipa, and as a result was Gao Wei's favorite. Empress Mu teamed up with Lu Lingxuan to accuse Consort Cao of witchcraft, and Consort Cao was executed. However, Gao Wei had other favorites such as Consort Dong.

As Empress Mu lost favor from Gao Wei, she offered Feng Xiaolian to Gao Wei as a consort, and Gao Wei favored Consort Feng greatly. He gave Consort Feng the title of Shufei (淑妃), the first rank among consorts. She changed her residence, which used to be where Consort Cao lived. She was described as alert, capable of dancing and playing the pipa. He became so infatuated with her that they went everywhere together and swore to heaven that they wanted to live together and die together.

== Consort ==
In winter 576, rival Emperor Wu of Northern Zhou launched a major attack on Northern Qi, capturing the important city of Pingyang (平陽, in modern Linfen, Shanxi). At that time, Gao Wei and Consort Feng were on a hunt at Qilian Lake (祁連池, in modern Xinzhou, Shanxi), and when Gao Wei learned that Pingyang had fallen, he wanted to rush to recapture it, but Consort Feng wanted to hunt for one more round, so he agreed. When he eventually gathered his troops, he put Pingyang under siege, intending to recapture it. The Northern Qi forces sieged Pingyang with all effort—and after several days, were able to breach the wall—but at this point, Gao Wei stopped his attack and summoned Consort Feng so she could witness the fall of the city. When she arrived, however, Northern Zhou forces had already filled in the breach, and therefore held the city.

Around the new year 577, Northern Zhou's Emperor Wu led an army intending to lift the siege on Pingyang. Gao Wei engaged him. As soon as the armies engaged, though, Consort Feng misinterpreted a slight backoff by part of the Northern Qi army and panicked, yelling, "We have been defeated!" This caused Gao Wei's official Mu Tipo to panic as well, and together they persuaded Gao Wei to abandon the army. The army collapsed after the emperor left. Gao Wei and Consort Feng then fled north to the secondary capital Jinyang (晉陽, in modern Taiyuan, Shanxi). (Gao Wei had intended to claim, if Pingyang had been captured, that it was the achievement of Consort Feng and then create her "Left Empress," and so had ordered his eunuchs to retrieve ceremonial clothes for an empress from Jinyang; on the way back to Jinyang, they met the eunuch, and despite the defeat, Gao Wei nevertheless had Consort Feng put on the empress's ceremonial clothes, although he did not create her Left Empress as he intended.) Once at Jinyang, Gao Wei had no will to resist Northern Zhou, and he fled back to the capital Yecheng (鄴城, in modern Handan, Hebei) with Consort Feng.

== Downfall ==
Once Gao Wei was back at Yecheng, in order to ward off an ill omen, he passed the throne to his son and crown prince Gao Heng (Empress Mu's son), taking the title Taishang Huang (retired emperor) but retaining imperial powers. Soon, he abandoned Yecheng, and fled south with his mother Grand Empress Dowager Hu, Empress Mu, Consort Feng, and the young emperor Gao Heng, but they were soon captured by Northern Zhou forces and taken back to Yecheng. Northern Zhou seized Northern Qi's territory. Later in the year, when Emperor Wu returned to the Northern Zhou capital Chang'an, he took Gao Wei and members of the Gao clan with him. Once at Chang'an, Gao Wei, who was created the Duke of Wen by Emperor Wu, requested to have Consort Feng back. Emperor Wu stated, "I view the world as a broken sandal, and how would I hold back this old woman from you, Duke?" He returned Consort Feng to Gao Wei.

In winter 577, Emperor Wu, apprehensive of the Gao clan, falsely accused Gao Wei of conspiring with Mu Tipo to rebel. Gao Wei and the other members of the Gao clan were forced to commit suicide. Emperor Wu awarded Lady Feng to his younger brother, Yuwen Da (宇文達) the Prince of Dai, as a concubine. Yuwen Da greatly favored her; however, once, when she accidentally broke a pipa string, she, lamenting Gao Wei, wrote a poem that read:

Although I receive favor today,
I remember the love I had yesterday.
If you want to know how my heart is broken,
Look at this glued string.

While being Yuwen Da's concubine, she made accusations against Yuwen Da's wife Princess Li, nearly leading to Princess Li's death. After the death of Emperor Wu's son and successor Emperor Xuan in 580, Emperor Xuan's father-in-law Yang Jian became regent over his son Emperor Jing of Northern Zhou. Several imperial princes of the Yuwen clan believed that Yang had designs on the throne but failed in a plot to kill him. After the plot, he began executing the imperial princes in earnest, and around the new year 581, he executed Yuwen Da and Yuwen Da's sons. He awarded Lady Feng to the official Li Xun (李詢) -- who happened to be Princess Li's brother. Li Xun's and Princess Li's mother, in order to avenge her daughter, humiliated Lady Feng by forcing her to wear rough clothes and grind grains. Lady Feng committed suicide.
