= Zu Ting =

Zu Ting (Chinese: 祖珽; Mandarin pronunciation: [tsù tʰìŋ]; ?-?), courtesy name Xiaozheng (孝征), was an official of the Chinese Northern Qi dynasty (550–577). He was renowned for his literary and administrative talents.

== Background ==
Zu Ting's father Zu Ying (祖瑩) was a general during Eastern Wei. Zu Ting himself was, in his youth, known for his quick reactions and literary talent, and he eventually became a low-level official. He once wrote a beautifully written ode on behalf of the official Moqi Shouluogan (万俟受洛干) -- an ode that Eastern Wei's paramount general Gao Huan read and was impressed by, and he retained Zu to be a secretary on his staff. Once, Gao Huan dictated 36 items to Zu, and Zu was able to write all of them down later without missing any single item, earning him great praise from his colleagues. Zu was also fluent in the Xianbei language, at that time a rarity for ethnically Han officials. (Indeed, Zu was said to understand a number of non-Han languages.)

However, Zu was also known for being a free spirit who did not follow the expected societal norms. Because he was in charge of regulating commerce while serving as Gao Huan's secretary, he took many bribes. He liked playing the pipa, and he wrote a number of pipa pieces and invited the young men and women to dance to the music. He spent much time seeking thrills with other junior officials Chen Yuankang (陳元康), Mu Zirong (穆子容), Ren Zhou (任冑), and Yuan Shiliang (元士亮), including gambling and luxury living. Once, when Gao Huan blamed him for embezzlement, he was able to deflect the blame to his superior Lu Zixian (陸子先) -- although he later admitted to his colleagues that he, not Lu, was responsible. Once, when he visited the house of the official Sima Shiyun (司馬世雲), he stole mirrors from Sima's house, and while others were ashamed for him, he himself did not seem ashamed. He also stole money from the general Dou Tai, but despite Dou's discovery of the theft, Gao Huan did not punish him.

Later, when Zu served on the staff of Gao Huan's heir apparent Gao Cheng, he stole volumes from the book Hualin Pianlüe (華林遍略) and sold them for money so that he could gamble. He also embezzled from the imperial granary. Both Gao Cheng and Gao Huan were angry, and they whipped him and sentenced him to hard labor. At that time, however, a new Buddhist temple that Gao Huan had commissioned, the Dingguo Temple (定國寺), was completed. When Gao Huan asked Chen and Wen Zisheng (溫子昇) for recommendations on someone who would be able to write an appropriate text for the dedication tablet, Chen recommended Zu. Gao Huan ordered Zu to write the dedication text, and Zu completed a beautifully written text within two days. On account of the well-written text and the speed in which it was written, Gao Huan retracted the sentence of hard labor, but still removed him from his post.

After Gao Huan died in 547, Gao Cheng took over as Eastern Wei's regent, and he took Zu back on his staff. Gao Cheng himself was assassinated by his servant Lan Jing (蘭京) in 549. Chen Yuankang was severely injured while making a futile attempt to save Gao Cheng, and while he was dying, he dictated his will to Zu and asked Zu to relay it to his brothers Chen Shuchen (陳叔諶) and Chen Jiqu (陳季璩). Zu intentionally omitted some of the properties and embezzled them. When Chen Shuchen later became aware of this, he complained to the official Yang Yin, but Yang pointed out to Chen Shuchen that as those properties appeared to be themselves ill-gotten gains, making the matter public would be bad for Chen Yuankang's memory, and so the matter was dropped.

After Gao Cheng's death, Gao Cheng's brother Gao Yang became regent. On one occasion, Zu was to submit a list of minor officials who were to be promoted—and he submitted a list of people who had bribed him. This was discovered, and he was sentenced to death by hanging, but Gao Yang pardoned him. Not changing his ways, he again secretly sold volumes of the Hualin Pianlüe, and was again sentenced to death by hanging. Gao Yang, impressed by his talent and unwilling to put him to death, spared him from the death penalty but removed him from his post.

== During the reigns of Emperor Wenxuan, Emperor Fei, and Emperor Xiaozhao ==
Gao Yang had Emperor Xiaojing of Eastern Wei yield the throne to him in 550, ending Eastern Wei and establishing Northern Qi. As Emperor Wenxuan, he remembered Zu Ting's talent and recalled him to serve in his administration, putting him in charge of drafting edicts. However, he eventually again removed Zu from office for embezzlement. Whenever he saw Zu, he often referred to him as "the thief," for which Zu bore a grudge. It was probably during Emperor Wenxuan's reign when Zu first befriended Emperor Wenxuan's younger brother Gao Zhan, the Prince of Changguang, as one of Zu's talents was making walnut oil for paintings, and he once offered walnut oil to Gao Zhan. When he did so, he commented, "According to fortunetelling principles, Your Royal Highness' bone structure shows great honor. I have once dreamed that you rode a dragon to heaven." Gao Zhan responded, "If that happened, I will make you, my brother, rich and powerful."

After Emperor Wenxuan died in 559 and was succeeded by his son Emperor Fei, Zu was recalled to the government to serve as a commandery governor—but he never actually took office, as Yang Yin, who commissioned him to that office, was killed in a coup. Instead, he again became an imperial document drafter. After Emperor Fei was deposed in 560 and replaced by his uncle Emperor Xiaozhao, Zu drew the new emperor's ire by submitting secret petitions excessively; Emperor Xiaozhao ordered his secretaries to refuse further submissions by Zu, but did not appear to remove him from his office.

== During Emperor Wucheng's reign ==
In 561, Emperor Xiaozhao died, and Gao Zhan became emperor (as Emperor Wucheng). He quickly promoted Zu, although this brought jealousy from Emperor Wucheng's most trusted official He Shikai, and He Shikai had him leave the capital to serve as a commandery governor, but Emperor Wucheng soon summoned Zu back to the capital to again be in charge of imperial edicts, and on one occasion Zu served as an envoy to the Chen dynasty.

In 565, Zu persuaded He Shikai that his fortune was linked to that of Emperor Wucheng—that as the other officials despised him, once Emperor Wucheng died, he would be in a desperate situation. He suggested to He Shikai that the solution was to suggest that the emperor pass the throne to his crown prince Gao Wei. Both Zu and He Shikai thereafter persuaded Emperor Wucheng that, in light of astrological signs that the emperor position should change and that it would be even more honored to be an emperor's father than to be emperor, he should pass the throne to Crown Prince Wei. Emperor Wucheng agreed, and did so in summer 565.

== During Gao Wei's reign ==
=== Before Emperor Wucheng's death ===
Although Emperor Wucheng passed the throne to Gao Wei and assumed the title Taishang Huang (retired emperor), he continued to be in charge of important decisions. As both he and Zu were still resentful of Emperor Wenxuan (because Emperor Wenxuan often battered Emperor Wucheng, and because Emperor Wenxuan often referred to Zu as "the thief"), Zu, in order to flatter Emperor Wucheng, suggested that Emperor Wenxuan's posthumous name and temple name be degraded—because Emperor Wenxuan was not wen (文, civil) nor was he a founder (which his temple name Xianzu (顯祖) would appear to denote. (Emperor Wenxuan was in fact Northern Qi's first emperor, but Emperor Wucheng did not view him as a founder as he viewed their father Gao Huan as the true founder of the dynasty.) Around the new year 566, by Zu's suggestion, Emperor Wenxuan's posthumous name was changed to Jinglie (景烈), and his temple name to Weizong, both of which were still complimentary but less so than before.

Also in 566, Zu and He Shikai falsely accused Emperor Wucheng's nephew Gao Xiaowan (高孝琬), the Prince of Hejian, of using witchcraft against Emperor Wucheng and satirizing the retired emperor. Eventually, Emperor Wucheng arrested and tortured Gao Xiaowan, leading to his death.

In 567, the ambitious Zu, wanting further promotion, wrote petitions accusing He Shikai, Zhao Yanshen (趙彥深), and Gao Wenyao (高文遙) of crimes and requested his friend Liu Ti (劉逖), a secretary to the emperor, to submit the petitions for him. Liu refused, but He Shikai, Zhao, and Gao Wenyao received the news and prepared to defend themselves. Emperor Wucheng arrested Zu and interrogated him—and when seeing Emperor Wucheng, Zu accused He Shikai, Zhao, and Gao Wenyao of corruption, factionalism, and favoritism. Emperor Wucheng took the accusations personally and felt that Zu was assaulting his own competence. When Zu brought up the fact that he had an excessive number of ladies-in-waiting, he became even more infuriated. His anger grew even more heated when Zu first compared him to Xiang Yu and then pointed out that his accomplishments were far less. Emperor Wucheng battered and whipped him and sentenced him to hard labor, and subsequently had him confined to a dungeon in Guang Province (光州, roughly modern Yantai, Shandong). As Chinese cabbage seed oil was used as a lighting source in the dungeon, over time, the smoke from the burning of the oil made Zu blind.

=== After Emperor Wucheng's death ===
In 568, Emperor Wucheng died. He Shikai continued to be the most powerful official at court, but, even though he defeated several officials who tried to have him removed in 569, he had to share power with a number of individuals, including several of the young emperor Gao Wei's favorites—his wet nurse Lu Lingxuan and her son Mu Tipo, the guard commander Han Zhangluan, and the official Gao Anagong. Also in 569, Gao Wei, remembering Zu's contribution to his becoming emperor, released Zu from the dungeon in Guang Province and made him the governor of Hai Province (海州, roughly modern Lianyungang, Jiangsu). Zu took the chance to ingratiate himself with Lu Lingxuan and her brother Lu Xida (陸悉達), suggesting that he would be willing to serve as their strategist—and at the same time, He Shikai also thought of the same idea, and therefore recalled Zu back to the capital and reconciled with him. When, subsequently, Gao Wei's uncle Hu Changren (胡長仁) the Prince of Longdong formed a failed plot to assassinate He Shikai, it was Zu who suggested citing the example of how Emperor Wen of Han forced his uncle Bo Zhao (薄昭) to commit suicide to persuade Gao Wei to force Hu to commit suicide, as Gao Wei eventually did.

In 571, Gao Wei's younger brother Gao Yan the Prince of Langye, unable to stand the hold that He Shikai had on power, killed him by trickery, but subsequently failed in seizing power when the famed general Hulü Guang refused to side with him and was put under house arrest. After He Shikai's death, Zu formed a closer relationship with Lady Lu, and in winter 571, it was by her suggestion that Gao Wei removed Zhao Yanshen from his office and made him a provincial governor, replacing him with Zu. Subsequently, when Lady Lu, whom Gao Yan also targeted in his plot, suggested Gao Wei kill Gao Yan, Gao Wei took Zu into the palace and consulted him—and it was Zu, citing the example of the Duke of Zhou killing his treasonous brother the Ji Xian (姬鮮) the Lord of Guan and Ji You (姬友), a prince of Lu, poisoning his equally treasonous brother Ji Qingfu (姬慶父), who persuaded Gao Wei to have Gao Yan killed.

Also in winter 571, after Gao Wei's mother Empress Dowager Hu was found to have carried on an affair with the Buddhist monk Tanxian (曇獻), Gao Wei put her under house arrest. Zu, further trying to ingratiate himself with Lady Lu, suggested that Lady Lu be made empress dowager (under the precedence that the predecessor dynasty Northern Wei's emperors often made their wet nurses nurse empress dowagers), going as far as suggesting that Lady Lu was as great as the female deity Nüwa. Lady Lu in turn praised Zu as "the Master Statesman" and "National Treasure." (However, Gao Wei never actually made Lady Lu empress dowager.)

By summer 572, both Zu and Mu Tipo were in conflict with Hulü Guang. Hulü disliked Zu, and he often complained to his generals that Zu rarely consulted military generals. Once, when he was resting at a governmental building, Zu, who was blind, rode past him without realizing that Hulü was there, and never got off the horse as demanded by customs of the time. Hulü angrily stated, "Who does he think he is?" Zu, realizing that Hulü disliked him, bribed Hulü's servant and asked the servant about Hulü's opinion of him. The servant stated, "Ever since you came into power, the Minister Prince each night sighed and stated, "With a blind man in power, the empire will surely be destroyed." Meanwhile, Mu had once requested to marry Hulü's daughter by a concubine, but Hulü refused. Further, when Mu requested that Gao Wei grant him the public fields at Jinyang, Hulü publicly opposed the action as being detrimental to the grazing of the army's horses. Zu and Mu therefore both despited Hulü. They therefore fostered suspicion of Hulü in the emperor's mind, and that suspicion was exacerbated by the fact that Hulü's daughter and Gao Wei's wife Empress Hulü was not favored by Gao Wei.

At the same time, the Northern Zhou general Wei Xiaokuan, wanting to try to exploit Gao Wei's suspicions, decided to try to create a sense that Hulü would rebel. He wrote two songs in couplets, one of which read:

A hundred sheng [(升, a measurement unit -- and 100 sheng made up one hu (斛))] will fly up to the heavens,
A bright moon [(明月, mingyue, Hulü's courtesy name)] will shine over Chang'an [Northern Zhou's capital].

The other read:

The high [(高, gao)] mountain will collapse on its own,
The daimyo oak [(槲, hu)] will stand straight on its own.

He sent spies to spread the songs near the Northern Qi capital Yecheng (鄴城, in modern Handan, Hebei), and the songs soon became popular. Zu, exploiting the situation himself, added two more lines:

The blind man will bear a great axe,
The talkative woman will be unable to speak.

Both Zu and Lady Lu then reported the song to Gao Wei to further foster his suspicion of Hulü. Gao Wei consulted another favorite, Han Zhangluan, who believed that he should not suspect Hulü, so Gao Wei initially took no action. Zu, however, would not relent, and he had Hulü's subordinate Feng Shirang (封士讓) make a secret submission indicating that when Hulü had brought the army close to Yecheng in 571, he was plotting a coup. Gao Wei believed it this time, and under Zu's suggestion, he awarded Hulü a horse, and then, as Hulü arrived at the palace to thank the emperor, he had his guard commander Liu Taozhi (劉桃枝) seize Hulü and strangle him to death. Hulü's clan was slaughtered except for his youngest son Hulü Zhong (斛律鍾), and Empress Hulü was deposed. Subsequently, Lady Lu tried to have her adoptive daughter Consort Mu Sheli made empress but was forced to compromise with Empress Dowager Hu to have Empress Dowager Hu's niece Consort Hu made empress, a proposal that she had to formally make jointly with Zu.

Meanwhile, Zu, controlling the government, wanted to reorganize it to make it more efficient, reducing duplication in official responsibilities and wastefulness. He also wanted to remove incompetent and/or corrupt officials as well as reducing the ranks of eunuchs—but Lady Lu and Mu Tipo opposed. He therefore entered an alliance with Empress Hu's brothers Hu Junyu (胡君瑜) and Hu Junbi (胡君璧), promoting them and hoping that they would assist him. He also had his associate Li Bolü (麗伯律) accuse Mu Tipo's associate Wang Zichong (王子沖) of accepting bribes—knowing that if Wang were convicted, both Mu Tipo and Lady Lu would be implicated. Lady Lu, however, figured out what was happening, and found ways to have Hu Junyu and Hu Junbi demoted, and further had Empress Hu deposed in late 572 and replaced with Consort Mu. Zu began to suffer in his relations with Gao Wei, as the eunuchs were by now defaming him. When Gao Wei consulted Lady Lu and Han, both Lady Lu and Han used the opportunity to accuse Zu of crimes. Gao Wei, because he had sworn an oath to Zu earlier, spared him from death, but demoted him to the governorship of North Xu Province (北徐州, roughly modern Linyi, Shandong). When Zu initially refused to leave the palace, Han had him dragged out.

Also in 572, Chen launched a major attack on Northern Qi, capturing the area between the Yangtze and Huai Rivers within a span of several months. Agrarian rebellions rose in Northern Xu Province as a response to the Chen attack, and the rebels soon approached the capital of the province. Zu made surprise attacks on the rebels—particularly surprising them because they knew that he was blind and thought it would be impossible for him to battle them. Despite the lack of reinforcements (as Mu Tipo refused to send them, hoping that the rebels would kill Zu for him), Zu, after battling some half a month, defeated the rebels. Zu subsequently died while still serving as the governor of North Xu Province, but the year is not recorded in history.
