= Chengguang =

Chengguang (乘广) was a Chinese era name used by several emperors of China. It may refer to:

- Chengguang (425–428), era name used by Helian Chang, emperor of Xia
- Chengguang (577), era name used by Gao Heng, emperor of Northern Qi
