= Mu Sheli =

Chinese Northern Qi empress

- Reign: 572–577
- Predecessor: Empress Hu
- Successor: None (Dynasty collapsed)
- Issue: Gao Heng and others
- Dynasty: Northern Qi
- Mother: Mu Qingxiao

Mu Sheli (Chinese: 穆舍利; fl.560–577), originally named Mu Yeli (穆邪利), nickname Huanghua (黃花), was an empress consort of the Chinese Northern Qi dynasty. She was Gao Wei's last empress.

== Background ==
Mu Sheli's mother, Mu Qingxiao (穆輕霄), was initially a servant in the household of the official, Mu Zilun (穆子倫), and therefore carried his family name. Later, for reasons unknown, she became a servant of the official, Song Qindao (宋欽道), where she became pregnant and gave birth to Mu Sheli. (Mu Sheli's father is not known for certain, but some believed that Song Qindao was the father.) Song's wife was jealous of her and tattooed the character, Song, on her face.

After Song was killed in a power struggle in 560 between the prime minister, Yang Yin (of whom Song was an associate), and Emperor Fei's uncle, Gao Yan, the Prince of Changshan (later Emperor Xiaozhao), Mu Sheli became a servant inside the palace.

During Gao Wei's reign, she became a servant to his first wife, Empress Hulü. She had a sexual relationship with Gao Wei and became his favorite. Gao Wei's wet nurse, Lu Lingxuan, in order to strengthen her own power, offered to become Mu Sheli's adoptive mother, and had Gao Wei formally make Mu Sheli an imperial consort. Lady Lu went as far as having her son, Luo Tipo, change his family name to Mu.

== As imperial consort ==
In July or August 570, Consort Mu gave birth to Gao Wei's first son, Gao Heng. Lady Lu planned to have Gao Heng become crown prince in the future but feared that Empress Hulü would oppose it, and so she gave Gao Heng to Empress Hulü to raise. Later that year, Gao Heng was made crown prince.

In 572, believing in false accusations by the official Zu Ting that Empress Hulü's father, Hulü Guang, was about to rebel, Gao Wei killed Hulü Guang and his clan and deposed Empress Hulü. Lady Lu wanted to make Consort Mu empress, but at that time, Gao Wei favored his cousin, Consort Hu -- Empress Dowager Hu's niece, and Empress Dowager Hu, who had been put under house arrest by Gao Wei in 571 after her affair with the Buddhist monk Tanxian (曇獻) was discovered—wanted Consort Hu to be empress as well.

Not confident that she had sufficient persuasive power, however, she had to flatter and give gifts to Lady Lu, requesting her help. Lady Lu, seeing that Gao Wei favored Consort Hu at that time, jointly submitted, with Zu, the suggestion to make Consort Hu empress. In fall 572, Gao Wei made Consort Hu empress.

== As empress consort ==
However, Lady Lu did not relent in her hopes of making Consort Mu empress, stating to Gao Wei, "How can a son be crown prince and a mother be a servant girl, a concubine?" But as Gao Wei favored Empress Hu, she could not carry out her wishes. She therefore engaged witches to use witchcraft on Empress Hu. It was said that within a month, Empress Hu began to show symptoms of psychosis, often mumbling to herself or laughing without cause. Gao Wei began to fear and dislike her.

In winter 572, Lady Lu put Consort Mu in empress clothing and put her in a tent, surrounded with magnificent jewelry, and then told Gao Wei, "Let me show you a holy woman." When Gao Wei saw that it was Consort Mu, Lady Lu stated, "For a woman this beautiful not to be empress, who would be qualified to be empress?" Gao Wei agreed with her, and he made Consort Mu "Left Empress" (Zuǒ huánghòu, 左皇后) on 16 November 572 and gave Empress Hu the title, "Right Empress" (Yòu huánghòu, 右皇后).

Around the new year 573, Lady Lu would further carry out adverse action against Empress Hu. She intentionally acted angry before Empress Dowager Hu and stated, "What kind of niece would use that kind of language?" When Empress Dowager Hu asked her about it, she initially refused to say anything, and then when Empress Dowager Hu persisted, she said that Empress Hu had told Gao Wei, "The empress dowager's behavior is immoral and should not be followed." Empress Dowager Hu was incensed, and without verifying the information, she ordered Empress Hu be expelled from the palace, and then had Gao Wei depose her, and he depose her on 22 January 573. Her depose automatically made the Left Empress Mu to the more honorable position of the right empress.

Finally, on 27 March 573, Right Empress Mu was formally entitled as the only empress (huánghòu, 皇后). Trying to match the clothes made of pearl that he had earlier made for Empress Hu (but which had been destroyed in a fire), he tried to buy pearls from rival Northern Zhou, but Northern Zhou refused to sell him pearls—but somehow he was able to obtain sufficient pearls to do so.

Empress Mu, by this point, viewed Lady Lu as her mother and Mu Tipo her brother, ignoring her own mother, Mu Qingxiao, and Lady Lu received the honorific title of "Grand Lady" (taiji, 太姬), a title used for empresses' mothers pursuant to Northern Qi regulations; This position was higher than the emperor's elder sister, the grand princess, and equivalent to the emperor's elder aunt, the senior grand princess. Mu Qingxiao, believing that her daughter rejected her on account of her ugliness (from the tattoo), managed to have her tattoo removed and tried to see her daughter, but was never able to do so, as Lady Lu prevented all meetings between them.

After Empress Mu became empress, she began to lose favor from Gao Wei as he preferred Consort Cao and Consort Dong. Empress Mu teamed up with Lu Lingxuan to accuse Consort Cao of witchcraft, and she was executed.

After the death of Consort Cao, Empress Mu didn't regain the favor of Gao Wei, but instead he preferred Consort Dong. To divert his affections from Consort Dong, Empress Mu presented her servant, Feng Xiaolian. He greatly favored Feng Xiaolian and took her as a concubine, but he continued to honor Empress Mu as empress.

== As retired empress ==
In 576, Northern Zhou launched a major attack on Northern Qi, and by spring 577 was threatening Northern Qi's capital of Yecheng. In order to try to change his fortune, Gao Wei passed the throne to Gao Heng, taking the title of Taishang Huang (retired emperor). Empress Mu thereafter carried the title of Retired Empress. (Meanwhile, Empress Mu's adoptive brother Mu Tipo had surrendered to Northern Zhou, and upon hearing the news, her adoptive mother, Lady Lu, committed suicide.)

Gao Wei soon abandoned Yecheng, fleeing with Gao Heng, Grand Empress Dowager Hu, Retired Empress Mu, Consort Feng, and other concubines and children. On their way to the Chen dynasty, however, they were captured by Northern Zhou forces and returned to Yecheng.

== After Northern Qi's destruction ==
Subsequently, Gao Wei was made the Duke of Wen by Emperor Wu of Northern Zhou, and he and his entire clan was taken to the Northern Zhou capital of Chang'an.

Northern Qi territory was seized by Northern Zhou. Later that year, Emperor Wu, feeling threatened by them, falsely accused them of plotting treason with Mu Tipo, and had them, including Gao Wei and Gao Heng, put to death. Nothing further was recorded in history about Empress Mu.

Chinese royalty
Preceded by Empress Hu	Empress of Northern Qi; 572–577	Dynasty ended
Preceded by Empress Hu	Empress of China (Northern/Central); 572–577	Succeeded by Empress Ashina of Northern Zhou
