= Empress Hu (Gao Wei's wife) =

Empress Hu (胡皇后, personal name unknown; fl.570s) was an empress of the Chinese Northern Qi dynasty. She was Gao Wei's second empress.

She was the daughter of Hu Changren (胡長仁) the Prince of Longdong, who was the brother of Gao Wei's mother Empress Dowager Hu—making her and her husband cousins. Empress Dowager Hu had been discovered by Gao Wei to have carried out an affair with the Buddhist monk Tanxian (曇獻) in 571, and he put her under house arrest. Ashamed and wanting to please her son, she summoned Hu Changren's daughter to the palace and dressed her in the best clothes. Gao Wei saw her and was infatuated with her. He took her as a concubine.

After Gao Wei killed the general Hulü Guang on suspicion of treason in 572, he deposed Hulü Guang's daughter Empress Hulü. His powerful wet nurse Lu Lingxuan wanted to make her adoptive daughter Consort Mu Sheli, the mother of Gao Wei's crown prince Gao Heng, empress, but Empress Dowager Hu wanted Consort Hu to be empress. Not confident that she had sufficient persuasive power, however, she had to flatter and give gifts to Lady Lu, requesting her help. Lady Lu, seeing that Gao Wei favored Consort Hu at that time, she jointly submitted, with the official Zu Ting, the suggestion to make Consort Hu empress. On 11 September 572, Gao Wei created Consort Hu empress. To show his love for her, he made clothes out of pearls for her, although those clothes were later burned in a fire.

However, Lady Lu did not relent in her hopes of making Consort Mu empress, stating to Gao Wei, "How can a son be crown prince and a mother be a servant girl, a concubine?" But as Gao Wei favored Empress Hu, she could not carry out her wishes. She therefore engaged witches to use witchcraft on Empress Hu. It was said that within a month, Empress Hu began to show symptoms of psychosis, often mumbling to herself or laughing without cause. Gao Wei began to fear and dislike her. In winter 572, Lady Lu put Consort Mu in empress clothing and put her in a tent, surrounded with magnificent jewelry, and then told Gao Wei, "Let me show you a holy woman." When Gao Wei saw that it was Consort Mu, Lady Lu stated, "For a woman this beautiful not to be empress, who would be qualified to be empress?" Gao Wei agreed with her, and he created Consort Mu "Right Empress" and gave Empress Hu the title "Left Empress" on 16 November 572.

Around the new year 573, Lady Lu would further carry out adverse action against Empress Hu. She intentionally acted angry before Empress Dowager Hu and stated, "What kind of niece would use that kind of language?" When Empress Dowager Hu asked her about it, she initially refused to say anything, and then when Empress Dowager Hu persisted, she said that Empress Hu had told Gao Wei, "The empress dowager's behavior is immoral and should not be followed." Empress Dowager Hu was incensed, and without verifying the information, she ordered Empress Hu be expelled from the palace, and then had Gao Wei depose her on 22 January 573. However, at times, Gao Wei missed her, and he often sent gifts to her. When rival Northern Zhou launched a major attack in 577 and threatened the capital Yecheng in the spring of 578, she, along with his other deposed empress Empress Hulü, was summoned to the main palace, probably for her protection. Yecheng fell a few days later, and Gao Wei was captured in flight. Northern Zhou took over Northern Qi's territory. She subsequently remarried, although her new husband's name, unlike Empress Hulü's, was not recorded in history. It is not known when she died.

Chinese royalty
Preceded by Empress Hulü	Empress of Northern Qi; 572–573	Succeeded by Empress Mu
