= Empress Wucheng =

Empress Wucheng may refer to two contemporaries:

- Empress Dowager Hu (Northern Qi) (died after 581), wife of Emperor Wucheng
- Empress Ashina (551–582), empress of Northern Zhou
