= Empress of Northern Qi =

The Chinese Northern Qi dynasty had six empresses consort in its history:

1. Empress Li Zu'e (r. 550–559), the wife of Emperor Wenxuan.
2. Empress Yuan (r. 560–561), the wife of Emperor Xiaozhao.
3. Empress Hu (r. 561–565), the wife of Emperor Wucheng.
4. Empress Hulü (r. 565–572), the first wife of Gao Wei.
5. Empress Hu (r. 572–573), the second wife of Gao Wei.
6. Empress Mu (r. 572–577), the third wife of Gao Wei.
  Empress Hu and Empress Mu were co-empresses briefly from 572 to 573.
