= Gao Heng =

Chinese emperor

Gao Heng 高恆

Emperor of Northern Qi
- Reign: 4 February - 5 April 577
- Predecessor: Gao Wei
- Successor: None
- Born: 570
- Died: 577 (aged 6–7)
Full name
- Family name: Gāo (高); Given name: Héng (恆)
Era name and dates
- Chéngguāng (承光): 577
- House: Gao
- Dynasty: Northern Qi
- Father: Gao Wei
- Mother: Mu Sheli

Gao Heng (Chinese: 高恆; July or August 570 – 577), often known in historiography as the Youzhu of Northern Qi ((北)齊幼主, meaning 'child ruler'), was the sixth and last emperor of the Chinese Northern Qi dynasty. In 577, the Northern Qi was under a major attack by the rivaling Northern Zhou dynasty. Gao Heng's father Gao Wei, then emperor, wanted to try to deflect ill omens that portended a change in imperial status. He and therefore passed the throne to Gao Heng. Later that year, after they fled in face of Northern Zhou forces' arrival, they were captured and taken to the Northern Zhou capital Chang'an. There in winter 577, the Emperor Wu of Northern Zhou ordered them, as well as other members of the Gao clan, to commit suicide. Northern Qi territories were annexed by the Northern Zhou, marking the collapse of the Northern Qi dynasty. Gao Jie (高湝) succeeded to the Northern Qi throne thereafter, although this was only nominal due to the dynasty's de facto end. For several years Gao Wei's cousin Gao Shaoyi also claimed the imperial title in exile, under Tujue's protection.

== Background ==
Gao Heng was born in July or August 570, as the oldest son of the emperor Gao Wei. His mother was Gao Wei's then-concubine Consort Mu Sheli. To celebrate his birth, Gao Wei declared a general pardon. Gao Wei's powerful wet nurse Lu Lingxuan, who was also Consort Mu's adoptive mother, wanted Gao Heng to be crown prince and eventually inherit Gao Wei's throne, but was afraid of opposition by Gao Wei's wife Empress Hulü. She therefore, with Gao Wei's approval, gave Gao Heng to Empress Hulü to raise. Later that year, on c.2 November 570, when Gao Heng was only three months old, Gao Wei created him crown prince. After Empress Hulü's father, the general Hulü Guang, was executed under false charges of treason, Empress Hulü was deposed, and while initially Consort Mu was not created empress, in winter 572 she was first created "Right Empress," and then became sole empress in March 573 after Left Empress Hu was deposed.

In 576, rival Northern Zhou launched a major attack on Northern Qi. Gao Wei initially personally led troops to battle Emperor Wu of Northern Zhou, but after suffering a great defeat at Pingyang (平陽, in modern Linfen, Shanxi), he fled back to the secondary capital Jinyang (晉陽, in modern Taiyuan, Shanxi) and lost the will to fight. In order to prepare for flight first to Shuo Province (朔州, roughly modern Shuozhou, Shanxi) and then possibly Tujue, Gao Wei first sent his mother Empress Dowager Hu and Gao Heng to Shuo Province. After he changed his mind and fled back to the capital Yecheng (鄴城, in modern Handan, Hebei) around the new year 577 in the face of Northern Zhou attack on Jinyang, however, the general Gao Mai (高勱) escorted both Empress Dowager Hu and Crown Prince Heng back to Yecheng as well. Believing the words of his astrologers that the omens showed that the imperial seat was about to be changed, Gao Wei decided to pass the throne to Gao Heng, and spring 577, the young crown prince took the throne as emperor, but with his father Gao Wei still in control as Taishang Huang (retired emperor).

== Reign ==
The young emperor's reign did not last long, as Northern Zhou forces approached Yecheng soon thereafter. Instead of taking a last stand at Yecheng as Gao Mai suggested, Gao Wei decided to flee from Yecheng to the provinces south of the Yellow River, to try to regroup the troops, and if that could not be done, to flee to the Chen dynasty. With that in mind, Gao Wei first sent Grand Empress Dowager Hu, Retired Empress Mu, and Gao Heng to Ji Province (濟州, roughly modern Liaocheng, Shandong). He soon abandoned Yecheng and joined them there as well. Once he arrived, he issued an edict in the young emperor's name further passing the throne to Gao Wei's uncle Gao Jie (高湝) the Prince of Rencheng—although the edict appeared to have never reached Gao Jie, as the official that Gao Wei sent to deliver the edict and the imperial seal to Gao Jie, Hulü Xiaoqing (斛律孝卿), surrendered to Northern Zhou after leaving Ji Province. (The edict also gave Gao Heng an alternative title, but what that alternative title was is disputed among historical sources. The Book of Northern Qi gave it as "Heavenly Prince Protector" (守國天王, Shouguo Tian Wang). Zizhi Tongjian gave it as Heavenly Prince of Song (宋國天王, Songguo Tian Wang), and Zizhi Tongjian's commentator Hu Sanxing believed that it should be "Heavenly Prince of the Primary Line" (宗國天王, Zongguo Tian Wang). Whether that alternative title was actually used, however, is unclear.)

Meanwhile, Northern Zhou forces continued their pursuit, and Gao Wei, leaving Grand Empress Dowager Hu at Ji Province, fled further south with Retired Empress Mu, Consort Feng Xiaolian, Gao Heng, and some of his other close followers to Qing Province (青州, roughly modern Qingzhou, Shandong). Northern Zhou forces, however, soon arrived at Qing Province as well, and Gao Wei's party tried to flee south to Chen, but were captured and delivered back to Yecheng, where they were initially treated with respect by Northern Zhou's Emperor Wu. Soon, Northern Zhou took control of nearly all of Northern Qi territory, and when Emperor Wu returned to the Northern Zhou capital Chang'an, he took Gao Wei and the members of the Gao clan, including Gao Heng, with him. (This traditionally marked the end of Northern Qi, with Gao Heng as its last emperor, although Gao Wei's cousin Gao Shaoyi the Prince of Fanyang fled to Tujue and later claimed the Northern Qi throne in exile.)

== Death ==
Emperor Wu initially created Gao Wei the Duke of Wen, but in winter 577, he, apprehensive of the Gao clan, falsely accused Gao Wei of plotting rebellion with his former official Mu Tipo, and then ordered him and other members of the Gao clan to commit suicide. Gao Heng died in the massacre. Only during the regency of Yang Jian over Emperor Wu's grandson Emperor Jing of Northern Zhou were members of the Gao clan, including Gao Heng, properly buried north of Chang'an.

Chinese royalty
Preceded by Gao Wei	Emperor of Northern Qi; 577	Succeeded by Gao Shaoyi (Prince of Fanyang)
Preceded by Gao Wei	Emperor of China (Northern/Central); 577	Succeeded by Emperor Wu of Northern Zhou
