= He Shikai =

He Shikai (Chinese: 和士開) (524 – 30 August 571), courtesy name Yantong (彥通), was an official of the Northern Qi dynasty of China. He was a close associate of the Emperor Wucheng (Gao Zhan) prior to the latter's accession to the throne, and he became a powerful official (and lover to Emperor Wucheng's wife Empress Hu) during Emperor Wucheng's reign. He was criticized in traditional histories as a corrupt and incompetent official. After Emperor Wucheng's death, Emperor Wucheng's son Gao Yan, the Prince of Langya, was displeased with the authority that He Shikai was still wielding, and killed him in a coup in 571, but subsequently was himself killed.

== Background ==
He Shikai was born in 524 and from Northern Qi's capital Yecheng. His ancestors were described as merchants from the Western Regions (Xiyu) and originally carried the family name Suhe (素和), which was later changed to He. He Shikai's father He An (和安) was described as a respectful and diligent imperial official during the reign of Emperor Xiaojing of Eastern Wei, whose humility was well regarded by the paramount general Gao Huan. In He Shikai's youth, he was considered intelligent, and he was selected as a student for the national university. His classmates praised him for his quick reactions.

== Prior to Emperor Wucheng's reign ==
After Gao Huan's son Gao Yang seized the throne from Emperor Xiaojing in 550 and established Northern Qi as its Emperor Wenxuan, he created his younger brother Gao Zhan the Prince of Changguang. He Shikai served on Gao Zhan's staff. As Gao Zhan liked the gambling game Shuo (槊) and He Shikai was a good Shuo player, they befriended each other. They also shared common interests, including a non-Han version of the instrument pipa. They were so close that once, when he complimented Gao Zhan, "Your royal highness is no heavenly person, but in fact will be a heavenly emperor," Gao Zhan responded, "You are no earthly person, but are an earthly god." However, Emperor Wenxuan disliked He Shikai for his frivolousness, and at one point removed him from his post and exiled him to the northern border. Later, after much begging by Gao Zhan, Emperor Wenxuan allowed He Shikai to return to Yecheng and to serve again as an official.

== During Emperor Wucheng's reign ==
After Gao Zhan became emperor in 561 (as Emperor Wucheng), He Shikai began to be promoted in earnest. When his mother Lady Liu died, Emperor Wencheng wept and sent the general Lü Fen (呂芬) to mourn Lady Liu on his behalf. He also soon summoned He Shikai back to the palace and ordered him and his four younger brothers to resume their official posts rather than observe the three-year mourning period for parents.

Emperor Wucheng suffered from a form of asthma that was particularly aggravated by drinking—and yet still drank. He Shikai often urged him to stop drinking, and on one occasion, when Emperor Wucheng was having breathing problems but nevertheless was about to drink, He Shikai wept heavily and was unable to speak. Emperor Wucheng responded, "You are making a speechless correction of me." He then stopped drinking. He Shikai had become so favored and trusted by Emperor Wucheng that Emperor Wucheng could not bear not seeing him, often requiring him to stay at the palace. Whenever He Shikai would go home, Emperor Wucheng would soon summon him to the palace again, and he rewarded He Shikai with great wealth. They participated in what were described as "immoral games" together, lacking boundaries between emperor and subject. He Shikai later started an affair with Emperor Wucheng's wife Empress Hu. However, one occasion at which Emperor Wucheng did not listen to He Shikai was in summer 562, when Emperor Wucheng's mother Empress Dowager Lou Zhaojun died, and he refused to wear the white mourning clothes and continued to feast and play music. When He Shikai requested that the music be stopped, Emperor Wucheng was displeased and slapped He Shikai.

He Shikai once stated to Emperor Wucheng:

Ever since ancient times, all kings and emperors have turned to dust. What difference is there between Emperors Yao and Shun [two mythical kind emperors] and Jie of Xia and King Zhou of Shang [two legendary cruel kings]? your Imperial Majesty should, while you are still young and strong, enjoy life as much as possible and do whatever you wish. One day of extraordinary happiness is as great as one thousand years of ordinary living. Entrust the affairs of the state to the high-level officials, and do not worry that they would not be done. Do not mistreat yourself and make yourself unable to do anything.

Emperor Wucheng, persuaded, entrusted the civil service system to Zhao Yanshen (趙彥深), financial matters to Gao Wenyao (高文遙), the civilian administration over military affairs to Tang Yong (唐邕), and the education of Crown Prince Wei to Empress Hu's brother-in-law Feng Zicong (馮子琮) and cousin Hu Changcan (胡長璨). He himself only attended meetings with his ministers every three to four days, and he would often make short appearances and make several quick approvals and then end the meeting. Traditional historians usually viewed this as a major turnpoint leading to the degrading quality of Northern Qi imperial governance. Meanwhile, He Shikai became exceedingly powerful, and was known and praised for often finding ways to save other officials who were accused of crimes—but criticized for then extracting gifts from them. Further, because of He Shikai's tendency to overlook officials' offenses, the level of corruption in the Northern Qi government grew substantially.

Around 565, the official Zu Ting persuaded He Shikai that his fortunes were tied to the emperor's—and that if the emperor shall die, he would be in a desperate situation—and that he could solve this by suggesting Emperor Wucheng to pass the throne to his son, Gao Wei the Crown Prince, so that both the crown prince and Empress Hu would be grateful to him as well. He Shikai agreed, and both he and Zu offered the suggestion to Emperor Wucheng—stating to him that astrological signs indicating that the imperial position would be changed was a sign that he should pass the throne, particularly because it would be even more honored to be the father of an emperor than to be an emperor. Emperor Wucheng agreed, and in summer 565, he passed the throne to the eight-year-old Crown Prince Wei. Emperor Wucheng took the title Taishang Huang (retired emperor). (Zu subsequently had a falling out with He Shikai in 567, as he tried to have He Shikai, Zhao Yanshen, and Gao Wenyao removed, but in doing so offended Emperor Wucheng, and was imprisoned in a dungeon, where he lost his eyesight due to smoke from the Chinese cabbage seeds used for lighting.)

In spring 568, Emperor Wucheng suffered a major illness, and the official Xu Zhicai (徐之才), who was an accomplished physician, treated him back to health. After Emperor Wucheng recovered, however, He Shikai, whose position was lower than Xu's, wanted to be promoted, and so had Xu sent out to Yan Province (兗州, roughly modern Jining, Shandong) to be governor. In winter 568, Emperor Wucheng suddenly fell ill again, and he summoned Xu. Before Xu could arrive, however, around the new year 569, he died, while holding He Shikai's hands and entrusting the important matters to him.

== After Emperor Wucheng's death ==
He Shikai initially kept the news of Emperor Wucheng's death secret, worried that the high-level officials might conspire in light of the retired emperors' death; rather, he wanted to gather the officials before announcing it. Empress Hu's brother-in-law Feng Zicong (馮子琮) persuaded him that by not announcing the news of the retired emperor's death, he might in fact be fostering what he was trying to avoid, and He Shikai announced the news.

Gao Wei honored Retired Empress Hu as empress dowager. At that time, the important matters were ruled on by a collective leadership of eight officials—He Shikai, Lou Dingyuan (婁定遠), Zhao Yanshen, Gao Wenyao, Tang Yong, Qilian Meng (綦連猛), Gao Anagong, and Hu Changcan. However, in fighting soon developed, as by spring 569, Emperor Wucheng's cousin Gao Rui (高叡) the Prince of Zhao Commandery, Emperor Wucheng's brother Gao Run (高潤) the Prince of Fengyi, Emperor Wucheng's nephew Gao Yanzong the Prince of Ande, Lou, and Gao Wenyao, were all recommending that He Shikai, who was clearly the most powerful of the eight, be made a provincial governor. Gao Rui, in particular, was most critical of He Shikai for being corrupt and immoral. Faced with the officials' pressure, He Shikai agreed to be sent out to the provinces (along with Gao Wenyao), and it was announced that after Emperor Wucheng's burial, He Shikai would be made the governor of Yan Province while Gao Wenyao would be made the governor of Western Yan Province (西兗州, roughly modern Anyang, Henan). After Emperor Wucheng's burial, Gao Rui pressured He Shikai to leave Yecheng as quickly as possible, despite Empress Dowager Hu's desire to keep He Shikai for 100 days after Emperor Wucheng's burial. He Shikai bribed Lou and was permitted to meet Empress Dowager Hu and Gao Wei once more—and he persuaded them that the high-level officials were intending harm to them and that they could only trust him. Gao Wei thus issued an edict rebuking Gao Rui. When Gao Rui nevertheless entered the palace to try to pressure Empress Dowager Hu and Gao Wei to remove He Shikai. Empress Dowager Hu, instead, arrested Gao Rui and had the guard commander Liu Taozhi (劉桃枝) strangle Gao Rui. Thereafter, He Shikai's power went unchecked. The other favorite associates of Gao Wei—including Gao Wei's wet nurse Lu Lingxuan and her son Mu Tipo, as well as Zu Ting (who had by this point reconciled with He Shikai, who returned him to the government despite his blindness because he needed a strategist). In 570, Gao Wei created He Shikai the Prince of Huaiyang.

By spring 571, however, He Shikai was having conflicts with both Feng Zicong and Empress Dowager Hu's favorite son and Gao Wei's brother, Gao Yan the Prince of Langye. He moved Gao Yan out of the palace and disallowed him from having access to Empress Dowager Hu at all times. He further considered making Gao Yan a provincial governor and removing him from military commands. Gao Yan consulted Feng, and they formed a plot to kill He Shikai. Gao Yan had his associate Wang Ziyi (王子宜) submit a petition accusing He Shikai of crimes and requesting that he be arrested—and Feng then put the petition along with other ordinary petitions. Gao Wei, without reading the petition carefully, approved it. Gao Yan showed the approved petition to the general Kudi Fulian (庫狄伏連) and instructed him to arrest He Shikai. In fall 571, as He Shikai was about to enter the palace, Kudi and Wang took him to another governmental building, where he was killed on Gao Yan's orders. Gao Yan sent troops to have Lady Lu and Mu killed, but his plan collapsed when general Hulü Guang arrived and ordered them to stand down. Gao Wei initially spared Gao Yan but had him killed in winter 571. Gao Wei spent days mourning He Shikai and posthumously granted him several honors and made his son He Daosheng (和道盛) and He Xiuzhi (和休之) honored (although not particularly powerful) officials.

== Notes and references ==
- Book of Northern Qi, vol. 50 .
