= Gao Shaoyi =

Exiled ruler of the Northern Qi dynasty

Fanyang Wang (范陽王)
Family name:	Gao (高, gāo)
Given name:	Shaoyi (紹義, shào yì)
Posthumous name:	None

Gao Shaoyi (Chinese: 高紹義) (fl.550s–580), often known by his princely title Prince of Fanyang (Chinese: 范陽王), was an imperial prince of the Chinese Northern Qi dynasty. He claimed the Northern Qi throne in exile under the protection of Tujue after the rival Northern Zhou dynasty seized nearly all of Northern Qi territory and captured the emperors, Gao Shaoyi's cousin Gao Wei and Gao Wei's son Gao Heng in 577. In 580, Tujue, after negotiating a peace treaty with the Northern Zhou, turned Gao Shaoyi over to the Northern Zhou, and he was exiled to modern Sichuan, ending his claim on the Northern Qi imperial title. Most historians do not consider Gao Shaoyi a legitimate emperor of the Northern Qi.

== Background ==
Gao Shaoyi was the third son of Emperor Wenxuan, Northern Qi's first emperor. His mother was Emperor Wenxuan's concubine Consort Feng, who carried the title of Shifu (世婦), a title for third class imperial consorts. It is not known when he was born. On 30 September 559, Emperor Wenxuan created him the Prince of Guangyang. After Emperor Wenxuan's death later that year, Gao Shaoyi's older brother Gao Yin became emperor (as Emperor Fei), and on 28 January 560, Emperor Fei changed Gao Shaoyi's title to Prince of Fanyang.

During Emperor Fei's reign and the subsequent reigns of Gao Shaoyi's uncles Emperor Xiaozhao and Emperor Wucheng, Gao Shaoyi was gradually promoted through the official ranks, and, during Emperor Wucheng's reign, he was the mayor of the capital Yecheng. He was said to like drinking with his associates, and he was accused of having his eunuchs kill his teacher Ren Fangrong (任方榮). Emperor Wucheng caned him 200 times, and then sent him to Emperor Wenxuan's wife Empress Li Zu'e, who further caned him 100 times.

Nothing is known about Gao Shaoyi's activities in the following years. In 577, with rival Northern Zhou having launched a major attack on Northern Qi, then-emperor Gao Wei (Emperor Wucheng's son) fled from the secondary capital Jinyang (晉陽, in modern Taiyuan, Shanxi) back to Yecheng, and he made Gao Shaoyi the governor of Ding Province (定州, roughly modern Baoding, Hebei). Subsequently, after Gao Wei was captured by Northern Zhou forces, most Northern Qi provinces surrendered. However, Zhao Mu (趙穆), the former gubernatorial secretary of Northern Shuo Province (北朔州, roughly modern Shuozhou, Shanxi), captured the Northern Zhou general (and former Northern Qi general) Feng Fuxiang (封輔相), whom Emperor Wu of Northern Zhou had made the military governor of the Northern Shuo Province and tried to welcome Gao Shaoyi's uncle Gao Jie (高湝) the Prince of Rencheng to Northern Shuo Province to head the resistance, but could not do so. He therefore welcomed Gao Shaoyi instead, and when Gao Shaoyi arrived at Mayi (馬邑), the capital of Northern Shuo Province, the people of the local region supported his resistance movement. He led his troops south to try to recapture Jinyang, but was unsuccessful in first sieging Xinxing (新興, in modern Xinzhou, Shanxi), and Northern Zhou's counterattack was successful in capturing Lu Qiong (陸瓊), the governor of Xian Province (顯州, part of modern Xinzhou), and Gao Shaoyi retreated to Mayi. As the Northern Zhou general Yuwen Shenju (宇文神舉) approached Mayi and defeated Gao Shaoyi, Gao Shaoyi decided to flee to Tujue. At this time, he still had about 3,000 men, and he issued an order, "If you want to return, do so." More than half took up his offer and left him.

When Gao Shaoyi arrived at Tujue, Tujue's Tuobo Khan, who had long admired Emperor Wenxuan, saw that Gao Shaoyi, like Emperor Wenxuan, had a particularly large ankle, and therefore particularly favored and respected Gao Shaoyi. He transferred the former Northern Qi subjects, whether they fled to or were captured to Tujue, to be under Gao Shaoyi's command.

== Imperial claim in exile ==
Almost all of Northern Qi territory fell into Northern Zhou hands, but Gao Baoning (高寶寧), a distant relative of the Gao imperial line and governor of Ying Province (營州, roughly modern Chaoyang, Liaoning), refused to surrender. Around the new year 578, Gao Baoning, sent a petition to Gao Shaoyi, requesting that he take imperial title. Gao Shaoyi therefore declared himself emperor, with military assistance from Tujue.

In summer 578, Northern Zhou's Emperor Wu died, and Gao Shaoyi believed this to be a good opportunity to reestablish Northern Qi. At the same time, Lu Changqi (盧昌期), the leader of an agrarian rebellion at Youzhou (modern Beijing Municipality) captured Fanyang (范陽, in modern Baoding) and welcomed Gao Shaoyi to join him. Gao Shaoyi, commanding Tujue forces, sought to aid Lu by attacking Jicheng (modern Beijing), and he defeated Yuwen Shenju's subordinate Yuwen En (宇文恩), but meanwhile, Yuwen Shenju captured Fanyang and killed Lu. Gao Shaoyi took up mourning clothes and publicly mourned Lu, but then withdrew back to Tujue. Gao Baoning, who had also tried to come to Lu's aid, also withdrew back to Ying Province.

In spring 579, Tuobo Khan sought peace with Northern Zhou. Emperor Xuan of Northern Zhou created the daughter of his uncle Yuwen Zhao (宇文招) the Prince of Zhao the Princess Qianjin, offering to give her to Tuobo Khan in marriage if Tuobo Khan would be willing to surrender Gao Shaoyi. Tuobo Khan refused.

== Death ==
In 580, after Emperor Xuan's death, Yang Jian, the regent for Emperor Xuan's son Emperor Jing of Northern Zhou, nevertheless sent Princess Qianjin to Tujue to marry Tuobo Khan. After the marriage, Yang then sent the official Heruo Yi (賀若誼) to Tujue to bribe Tuobo Khan to give up Gao Shaoyi. Tuobo Khan agreed, and as a ruse, he invited Gao Shaoyi to a hunt, but instead had Heruo Yi capture Gao Shaoyi. In fall 580, Gao Shaoyi was delivered to Northern Zhou's capital Chang'an, and he was exiled to modern Sichuan. Meanwhile, his wife Princess Feng had fled back from Tujue, and while they were not able to reunite, Gao Shaoyi sent her a letter that stated, "The barbarians were faithless, and they sent me here." He eventually died in exile, but the year of his death is not known.

== Era name ==
- Wuping (武平 wǔ píng) 578–580

== Personal information ==
- Father
  - Emperor Wenxuan of Northern Qi
- Mother
  - Consort Feng, Emperor Wenxuan's concubine
- Wife
  - Princess Feng, daughter of Feng Xiaowan (封孝琬)

Regnal titles
Preceded by Gao Heng	Emperor of Northern Qi; 578–580	Succeeded by None (dynasty destroyed)
