= Lu Lingxuan =

Chinese lady in waiting (504–577)

Lu Lingxuan (陸令萱) (504 - 577) was a lady in waiting in the palace of the Chinese Northern Qi dynasty. As she served as the wet nurse to the emperor Gao Wei, she became exceedingly powerful during his reign, at times eclipsing in importance his mother Empress Dowager Hu and was often criticized by historians for her corruption and treachery.

After the fall of Northern Qi, members of her family were either executed or enslaved by the victorious Northern Zhou forces.

== Life ==
It is not known when Lu Lingxuan was born, she was ethnically Xianbei. Her husband was named Luo Chao (駱超), who was a general of Xianbei origin as well and was executed after he was accused of treason. Lady Lu and their son, Luo Tipo were taken into the palace to serve as servants.

After Gao Wei, the son of then-Prince of Changguang Gao Zhan and Gao Zhan's wife Princess Hu, was born in 557, Lady Lu became his wet nurse. She was described as intelligent and devious and became a favorite of Princess Hu. She might have also nursed Princess Hu's second son, Gao Yan.

=== Court official ===
Gao Zhan became emperor (as Emperor Wucheng) in 561 AD after the death of his brother Emperor Xiaozhao, and he created Princess Hu empress and Gao Wei crown prince.

In 565, in order to deflect ominous astrological signs, he passed the throne to Gao Wei, although he retained imperial powers as Taishang Huang (retired emperor). Lady Lu brought Luo Tipo into the palace to serve as a playmate for Gao Wei, and they carried out many activities together.

After Emperor Wucheng's death around the new year 569, Retired Empress Hu became empress dowager, and Lady Lu became a particular confidant and very powerful within the palace. Empress Dowager Hu created her a lady of a commandery, and powerful officials, including Empress Dowager Hu's lover He Shikai and Gao Anagong, flattered her and were willing to treat her as mother.

Because the female servant of Gao Wei's wife Empress Hulü, Mu Sheli was particularly favored by Gao Wei, Lady Lu, in order to affirm her own power, volunteered to be her adoptive mother and endorsed her to become an official imperial consort. She went as far as having Luo Tipo change his name to Mu Tipo. As of 569, she was also in an alliance with the official Zu Ting. Her son Mu Tipo also became a powerful official in his own right.

In 570, Consort Mu gave birth to Gao Wei's first son, Gao Heng. Lady Lu wanted to have Gao Heng become crown prince and inherit the throne one day, but was afraid that Empress Hulü would oppose it, so she gave Gao Heng to Empress Hulü for her to raise. Later in 570, Gao Heng was created crown prince.

In summer 571, Gao Wei's younger brother Gao Yan the Prince of Langye, angry at the hold He Shikai and Mu Tipo had on power, killed He Shikai, and then gathered his troops. He then tried to use trickery to draw Lady Lu out of the palace so that he could murder her as well but was unable to. He was soon himself captured when the general Hulü Guang (Empress Hulü's father) refused to side with him, and it was at least partially at her instigation that Gao Wei put Gao Yan to death in fall 571.

In winter 571, after Empress Dowager Hu was found to have had an affair with the Buddhist monk Tanxian (曇獻), Gao Wei put her under house arrest. Zu proposed that, in the precedence of the preceding dynasty Northern Wei's title of nurse empress dowager for wet nurses, Lady Lu be created empress dowager to replace Empress Dowager Hu. Gao Wei did not do so, but the authority that Empress Dowager Hu had was effectively displaced by Lady Lu.

=== Empress affair ===
In 572, Zu falsely accused Hulü Guang of treason—an accusation that Lady Lu concurred in—and Gao Wei killed Hulü Guang and most members of his clan. Empress Hulü was deposed. Lady Lu wanted to have Consort Mu, her adoptive daughter, created empress, but at that time, Gao Wei favored Empress Dowager Hu's niece Consort Hu.

Empress Dowager Hu wanted her niece created empress, but felt she had insufficient persuasive power, and she gave gifts to Lady Lu, referring to her as sister, and requested her help. Lady Lu reluctantly agreed, and she jointly with Zu suggested that Consort Hu be created empress. Consort Hu became empress in fall 572. However, Lady Lu did not relent in her hopes of making Consort Mu empress, stating to Gao Wei, "How can a son be crown prince and a mother be a servant girl, a concubine?" But as Gao Wei favored Empress Hu, she could not carry out her wishes. She therefore engaged witches to use witchcraft on Empress Hu.

It was said that within a month, Empress Hu began to show symptoms of psychosis, often mumbling to herself or laughing without cause. Gao Wei began to fear and dislike her.

In winter 572, Lady Lu put Consort Mu in empress clothing and put her in a tent, surrounded with magnificent jewelry, and then told Gao Wei, "Let me show you a holy woman." When Gao Wei saw that it was Consort Mu, Lady Lu stated, "For a woman this beautiful not to be empress, who would be qualified to be empress?" Gao Wei agreed with her, and he created Consort Mu "Right Empress" and gave Empress Hu the title "Left Empress.

Around the new year 573, Lady Lu further falsely told Empress Dowager Hu that Empress Hu had denigrated Empress Dowager Hu's moral character—and Empress Dowager Hu, in anger, without verifying the information, ordered Empress Hu expelled from the palace, and then had Gao Wei depose her.

Thereafter, it was said that Lady Lu and Mu Tipo were so powerful and so corrupt that they were openly taking bribes and selling the imperial offices, and all that they wished were carried out.

In spring 573, Right Empress Mu became sole empress. As Empress Mu treated Lady Lu as mother and Mu Tipo as brother, Lady Lu was honored with the title "Grand Lady" (太姬, taiji), typically reserved for an empress's mother, and Empress Mu ignored her own mother Mu Qingxiao (穆輕霄). When Mu Qingxiao tried to see Empress Mu, Lady Lu prevented the meeting.

=== Deposition of Zu ===
Meanwhile, the alliance between Lady Lu and Zu was breaking up. Zu, after he achieved even greater power after Hulü Guang's death, wanted to reorganize it to make it more efficient, reducing duplication in official responsibilities and wastefulness. He also wanted to remove incompetent and/or corrupt officials as well as reducing the ranks of eunuchs—but Lady Lu and Mu Tipo opposed. He therefore entered an alliance with Empress Hu's brothers Hu Junyu (胡君瑜) and Hu Junbi (胡君璧), promoting them and hoping that they would assist him. He also had his associate Li Bolü (麗伯律) accuse Mu Tipo's associate Wang Zichong (王子沖) of accepting bribes—knowing that if Wang were convicted, both Mu Tipo and Lady Lu would be implicated. Lady Lu, however, figured out what was happening, and found ways to have Hu Junyu and Hu Junbi demoted. (This was happening at the same time that she had Empress Hu deposed.)

At the same time, with the eunuchs accusing Zu of crimes, Gao Wei asked Lady Lu what her opinions were, and she initially intentionally refused to answer, and then eventually stated:

This old servant woman of your should die. Before, He Shikai told me that Zu Ting was knowledgeable and very capable, and I thought that he was a good man, so I recommended him. Based on my observations of his recent activities, however, he is wicked. It is difficult to know a man. I should die 10,000 times.

Another favorite official of Gao Wei, Han Zhangluan, also despised Zu, and together they had Zu demoted to a provincial governorship. Zu would not return to the central government for the rest of his life.

=== Death ===
In winter 576, rival Northern Zhou launched a major attack on Northern Qi. Around the new year 577, after a major defeat at Pingyang (平陽, in modern Linfen, Shanxi), Gao Wei abandoned the secondary capital Jinyang (晉陽, in modern Taiyuan, Shanxi) and fled back to the capital Yecheng.

However, Mu Tipo did not follow Gao Wei back to the capital, but instead headed west and surrendered to Northern Zhou. When Lady Lu heard this, she committed suicide. Her family members were all executed or taken as servants.

== Media ==
- Lu Lingxuan is portrayed by Zhao Liying in the Chinese television series Legend of Lu Zhen.
- Lu Lingxuan is portrayed by Lü Yi in Chinese television series The Legend of Dugu.
