= Empress Hulü =

Northern Qi empress

Empress Hulü (Chinese: 斛律皇后; personal name unknown) was an empress of the Northern Qi dynasty of China. She was Gao Wei's first empress, and she was a daughter of the general Hulü Guang.

Her family was one of the most prominent military families in Northern Qi, as her grandfather Hulü Jin was one of the major generals serving the dynasty's de facto founder Gao Huan and then continued to serve in his old age the successive emperors Emperor Wenxuan, Emperor Fei, Emperor Xiaozhao, and Gao Wei's father Emperor Wucheng. Her father Hulü Guang was honored even more for his military talent than her grandfather, and her uncle Hulü Xian (斛律羨) and brother Hulü Wudu (斛律武都) also served as major generals.

She married Gao Wei while he was still crown prince during Emperor Wucheng's reign—before Emperor Wucheng passed the throne to him in 565 while he was just eight years old. (Note: Her age at that time is not known, but she was probably around Gao Wei's age.) She carried the title of Crown Princess previously, and in 565 Emperor Wucheng, while passing the throne to Gao Wei, created her empress. She was not favored by Gao Wei, and she did not bear him a son, although she bore a daughter in c.February 572 and Gao Wei, in order to please Hulü Guang, initially claimed that it was a son and declared a general pardon, but was subsequently forced to reveal that it was a daughter. (Note: Gao Wei's concubine Consort Mu Sheli bore him his oldest son Gao Heng in 570, and as Consort Mu's adoptive mother Lu Lingxuan was planning to have Gao Heng made crown prince but feared that Empress Hulü would oppose, she gave Gao Heng to Empress Hulü to have her raise him.)

In August 572, the official Zu Ting falsely accused Hulü Guang of plotting rebellion, and Gao Wei executed Hulü Guang, along with his entire clan except his grandson Hulü Zhong (斛律鍾). Empress Hulü was not killed, but she was deposed on 13 September 572 and housed in a subsidiary palace. When rival Northern Zhou launched a major attack in 577 and threatened the capital Yecheng in spring 578, she, along with his other deposed empress Empress Hu, was summoned to the main palace, probably for her protection. Yecheng fell a few days later, and Gao Wei was captured in flight. Northern Zhou took over Northern Qi's territory.

After Northern Qi's fall, the former Empress Hulü married the Northern Zhou official Yuan Ren (元仁). Nothing further was recorded about her in history, including the year of her death.

== Notes ==
Chinese royalty
| Preceded by Empress Hu (Gao Zhan's wife) | Empress of Northern Qi; 565–572 | Succeeded by Empress Hu (Gao Wei's wife) |
