= Gao Yan (Northern Qi prince) =

Chinese imperial prince

Gao Yan (Chinese: 高儼; pinyin: Gāo Yǎn) (558 – 29 October 571), courtesy name Renwei (仁威), posthumously honored as Emperor Gong'ai of Chu (楚恭哀帝), was an imperial prince of China's Northern Qi dynasty. He was a son of the Emperor Wucheng (Gao Zhan) and Empress Hu, and was known as the Prince of Langye. In 571, during the reign of his older brother Gao Wei, he tried to seize power and killed Gao Wei's trusted official He Shikai and his allies. Gao Yan himself was killed after his army fled upon the arrival of the Jinyang army led by Hulü Guang. Some sources suggest he was killed by the powerful lady-in-waiting Lu Lingxuan, after a failed attempt to kill her.

== Background ==
Gao Yan was born in 558, as the third son of Gao Zhan, then the Prince of Changguang under his brother Emperor Wenxuan, and the second son of Gao Zhan's wife Empress Hu.

== During Emperor Wucheng's reign and term as "retired emperor" ==
In 564, Emperor Wucheng created Gao Yan the Prince of Dongping. In 565, at the urging of the officials He Shikai and Zu Ting, who persuaded Emperor Wucheng that astrological signs called for a change of imperial reign, and that passing the throne to Gao Yan's older brother, the Crown Prince Gao Wei would be a good way to ensure proper transition, Emperor Wucheng passed the throne to Gao Wei, but retained most imperial powers and took on the title of Taishang Huang (retired emperor).

Although Gao Wei was emperor, both Emperor Wucheng and Retired Empress Hu favored Gao Yan more than Gao Wei. As of 567, Gao Yan carried, among his other official titles, the title of Chief Examiner (御史中丞, Yushi Zhongcheng). As the Chief Examiner had the official responsibility of investigating official misconducts, during Northern Qi's predecessor dynasty Northern Wei, in order to show the authority of the Chief Examiner, he was allowed to take on the same honor as a crown prince while out on the street, and that even officials as honored as princes and duke were required to yield to the Chief Examiner's trains. This ritual, however, had been long abolished, but Emperor Wucheng, in order to give Gao Yan greater honor, revived the ritual. Gao Yan was so honored that even his uncles would bow down to him, and he was allowed to use all kinds of imperial implements that Gao Wei used, normally reserved to use by the emperor. Once, when he was visiting Gao Wei's palace, he saw fresh plums that had come from an ice cellar, and he threw a temper tantrum, stating, "Why is it that my brother gets to have them and I do not?" From that point on, if Gao Wei was supplied with something and Gao Yan was not, the imperial supplier would be punished.

Gao Yan was considered intelligent and dexterious, and he once asked Emperor Wucheng, "My brother is weak in personality. How can he lead the empire?" Emperor Wucheng praised him for being intelligent, and both he and Empress Hu considered removing Gao Wei and replacing him with Gao Yan but did not do so seriously and ultimately did not do so.

== Death ==
In winter 568, Emperor Wucheng suffered a major illness, and he died around the new year 569. After his death, the imperial government was initially led by a collective leadership, but by spring 569, most of the power was in He Shikai's hands, particularly because he carried on an affair with Empress Dowager Hu and was trusted by Gao Wei. Gao Yan, as the emperor's brothers, carried honored titles but was not as powerful, and he was displeased at the hold that He Shikai and another favorite of Gao Wei, Mu Tipo (the son of Gao Wei's -- and possibly Gao Yan's -- wet nurse Lu Lingxuan) wielded. He Shikai and Mu, in turn, were apprehensive about Gao Yan's strong personality. They had him move out of the South Palace, where the emperor also resided, and also prohibited him from seeing Empress Dowager Hu whenever he wished, as he was accustomed to do. They further considered making him a provincial governor to send him away from the capital Yecheng. Gao Yan consulted Empress Dowager Hu's brother-in-law Feng Zicong (馮子琮), who encouraged him to start an uprising to kill He Shikai.

Gao Yan then had his associate Wang Ziyi (王子宜) submit a petition accusing He Shikai submit a petition accusing He Shikai of crimes and requesting that he be arrested—and Feng then put the petition along with other ordinary petitions. Gao Wei, without reading the petition carefully, approved it. Gao Yan showed the approved petition to the general Kudi Fulian (庫狄伏連) and instructed him to arrest He Shikai. In fall 571, as He Shikai was about to enter the palace, Kudi and Wang took him to another governmental building, where he was killed on Gao Yan's orders.

Gao Yan's own personal plans was initially just to kill He Shikai, but his associates then pressured him to mobilize his personal troops (which he had because he was the commander of the capital defense forces) to take further actions against Lady Lu and Mu. When Gao Wei sent the imperial guards against Gao Wei, the imperial guards collapsed when their commander, Liu Taozhi (劉桃枝), saw Gao Yan and prostrated himself. Meanwhile, Gao Yan's cousins Gao Xiaoheng (高孝珩) the Prince of Guangning and Gao Yanzong the Prince of Ande also arrived and urged him to take further action to enter the palace to kill Lady Lu and Mu, but he hesitated. Both Gao Wei and Gao Yan then tried to summon the renowned general Hulü Guang—who, despite his approval of Gao Yan's action in killing He Shikai, was loyal to Gao Wei. Hulü, after meeting with the emperor, then approached Gao Yan's army and ordered them disbanded, and they collapsed. Hulü took hold of Gao Yan and escorted him into the palace. At Hulü's urging, Gao Wei spared Gao Yan, but executed his associates.

In order to protect Gao Yan, Empress Dowager Hu took him into her palace, and always tasted the food that he was served to make sure it was not poisoned. However, Lady Lu urged Gao Wei to execute Gao Yan, and Gao Wei, after consulting Zu, who agreed with Lady Lu, decided to do so. Later in the year, when Gao Wei visited the secondary capital Jinyang (晉陽, in modern Taiyuan, Shanxi), he took Empress Dowager Hu and Gao Yan with him. One day, he informed Empress Dowager Hu that he would take Gao Yan hunting the next morning. Just after midnight, he sent messengers to summon Gao Yan, and while Gao Yan was suspicious, he headed for Gao Wei's palace—and on the way, he was seized by Liu and suffocated. He was buried inside Daming Palace (大明宮), and while he had four posthumous sons, they were all executed after their birth. In spring 572, Gao Wei, in order to defuse Empress Dowager Hu's mourning, posthumously honored Gao Yan "Emperor Gong'ai of Chu," and honored Gao Yan's wife Princess Li "Empress of Chu." He also posthumously adopted his own son Gao Ke (高恪) into Gao Yan's line and, after Gao Ke also died shortly thereafter, posthumously adopted Gao Shijun (高世俊), the grandson of his uncle Gao Yān (高淹, note different tone) the Prince of Pingyang into Gao Yan's line.
