= Gao Wei =

Gao Wei 高緯

Emperor of Northern Qi
- Reign: June 8, 565 – February 4, 577
- Predecessor: Emperor Wucheng
- Successor: Gao Heng
- Born: May 29, 556
- Died: c.November 577 (aged 21)
- Consorts: Lady Hulü; Lady Hu of Anding; Mu Sheli; Feng Xiaolian
- Issue: Gao Heng; Gao Shande; Gao Maide; Gao Zhiqian
Full name
- Family name: Gāo (高); Given name: Wěi (緯)
Era dates
- Tiāntǒng (天統) (565-569); Wǔpíng (武平) (570-576); Lónghuà (隆化) (577)
Regnal name
- Heavenly King Shouguo (守國天王) (adopted after abdicating in 577)
- House: Gao
- Dynasty: Northern Qi
- Father: Emperor Wucheng
- Mother: Empress Wucheng

Gao Wei (高緯) (29 May 556 – c.November 577), often known in history as Houzhu of Northern Qi ((北)齊後主), courtesy name Rengang (仁綱), sometimes referred to by his later Northern Zhou-created title of Duke of Wen (溫國公), was the fifth emperor of the Northern Qi dynasty of China. During his reign, the Northern Qi's imperial administration was plunged into severe corruption and wastefulness, with the military suffering after Gao Wei killed the great general Hulü Guang in 572. Rival Emperor Wu of Northern Zhou launched a major attack in 576, and Northern Qi forces collapsed. Gao Wei, who formally passed the throne to his son Gao Heng, was captured while trying to flee to Chen dynasty, and later that year, the Northern Zhou emperor executed him and almost all members of his clan.

== Background ==
Gao Wei was born in 557, when his father Gao Zhan was the Prince of Changguang under Emperor Wenxuan, Gao Zhan's older brother. Gao Wei's mother was Gao Zhan's wife Princess Hu, and he was her first son, but not his father Gao Zhan's first son—as Gao Zhan's concubine Lady Li also gave birth several hours earlier on the same day Princess Hu did, to Gao Chuo (高綽). However, as Princess Hu was his wife, Gao Zhan publicly announced that Gao Wei was born first and treated him as the first-born. Thereafter, he was named Gao Zhan's heir apparent.

In 561, another older brother of Gao Zhan, Emperor Xiaozhao, died, leaving instructions for the throne to be passed to Gao Zhan. Gao Zhan therefore took the throne (as Emperor Wucheng). In 562, he created his wife Princess Hu empress and created Gao Wei crown prince. While Gao Wei was crown prince, he married the daughter of the key general Hulü Guang as his wife and crown princess.

In 565, with astrological signs indicating that the imperial position should be changed, Emperor Wucheng's favored officials He Shikai and Zu Ting, wanting to ingratiate themselves with Empress Hu and Gao Wei as well, suggested that Emperor Wucheng avoid the ill fortune by passing the throne to Gao Wei. Emperor Wucheng agreed, and Gao Wei, at age eight, became emperor, although Emperor Wucheng, carrying the title of Taishang Huang (retired emperor), retained the actual powers. Emperor Wucheng created Gao Wei's wife Crown Princess Hulü empress.

== Early reign (with Emperor Wucheng as regent) ==
In spring 567, Gao Wei celebrated his rite of passage.

Gao Wei was considered a young man of weak personality, and while Gao Wei was emperor, Emperor Wucheng and Retired Empress Hu both greatly favored his younger brother, Gao Yan the Prince of Dongping, honoring Gao Yan with many high offices and making sure that Gao Yan received all of the same supplies as his emperor brother did. Gao Yan was considered intelligent and decisive, and he once asked Emperor Wucheng, "My brother is weak in personality. How can he lead the empire?" Both Emperor Wucheng and Retired Empress Hu considered deposing Gao Wei and making Gao Yan emperor, but did not actually do so.

Around the year 569, Emperor Wucheng suffered a major illness and died suddenly, after entrusting the important matters to He Shikai. He Shikai, after initially not announcing Emperor Wucheng's death, did after several days. Retired Empress Hu now carried the title of empress dowager.

== Middle reign ==
After Emperor Wucheng's death, while Gao Wei formally took on imperial authorities himself, the government was led by a group of eight high-level officials—He Shikai, Lou Dingyuan (婁定遠), Zhao Yanshen (趙彥深), Gao Wenyao (高文遙), Tang Yong (唐邕), Qilian Meng (綦連猛), Gao Anagong, and Empress Dowager Hu's cousin Hu Changcan (胡長粲). However, infighting soon developed, as by spring 569, Emperor Wucheng's cousin Gao Rui (高叡) the Prince of Zhao Commandery, Emperor Wucheng's brother Gao Run (高潤) the Prince of Fengyi, Emperor Wucheng's nephew Gao Yanzong the Prince of Ande, Lou, and Gao Wenyao, were all recommending that He Shikai, who was clearly the most powerful of the eight, be made a provincial governor. Gao Rui, in particular, was most critical of He Shikai for being corrupt and immoral, as it was an open secret that He Shikai was having an affair with Empress Dowager Hu. Faced with the officials' pressure, He Shikai agreed to be sent out to the provinces (along with Gao Wenyao), and it was announced that after Emperor Wucheng's burial, He Shikai would be made the governor of Yan Province while Gao Wenyao would be made the governor of Western Yan Province (西兗州, roughly modern Anyang, Henan). After Emperor Wucheng's burial, Gao Rui pressured He Shikai to leave Yecheng as quickly as possible, despite Empress Dowager Hu's desire to keep He Shikai for 100 days after Emperor Wucheng's burial. He Shikai bribed Lou and was permitted to meet Empress Dowager Hu and Gao Wei once more—and he persuaded them that the high level officials were intending harm to them and that they could only trust him. Gao Wei thus issued an edict rebuking Gao Rui. When Gao Rui nevertheless entered the palace to try to pressure Empress Dowager Hu and Gao Wei to remove He Shikai. Empress Dowager Hu, instead, arrested Gao Rui and had the guard commander Liu Taozhi (劉桃枝) strangle Gao Rui. Thereafter, He Shikai's power went unchecked. The other favorite associates of Gao Wei included Gao Wei's wet nurse Lu Lingxuan and her son Mu Tipo, as well as Zu Ting.

In summer 570, Gao Wei's concubine Consort Mu Sheli gave birth to his first son, Gao Heng, and Gao Wei declared a general pardon. Lady Lu, who was also Consort Mu's adoptive mother, wanted Gao Heng to eventually be crown prince and emperor, but was afraid that Empress Hulü would oppose the plan, so she gave Gao Heng to Empress Hulü for her to raise. In winter 570, Gao Wei created Gao Heng crown prince.

During much of Emperor Wucheng's and Gao Wei's reign up to this point, rival Northern Zhou had gradually encroached on Northern Qi territory, making minor gains on the borders. In winter 570, Hulü Guang launched a counterattack and captured significant amounts of territory north of the Fen River (汾水, flowing through modern Linfen, Shanxi). He then also defeated Northern Zhou troops at Yiyang (宜陽, in modern Luoyang, Henan). On his way back to the capital Yecheng (鄴城, in modern Handan, Hebei), Gao Wei ordered his troops demobilized even though many of the soldiers had not received rewards. However, he received an order to demobilize his troops. Hulü Guang submitted a secret petition to Gao Wei, requesting the emperor to send imperial messengers to the army to honor the soldiers. Gao Wei did not act immediately, however, and the army approached Yecheng without receiving any words from the emperor. Gao Wei was displeased that Hulü Guang brought the army close to the capital, and he summoned Hulü to the palace before sending messengers to honor the soldiers and demobilizing them.

Later in 571, Gao Wei's brother Gao Yan, now the Prince of Langye, angry at the hold that He Shikai had on power, killed him, and further mobilized his troops to consider seizing power and killing Lady Lu and her son Mu Tipo, who had also become powerful. Hulü, while he approved of Gao Yan's killing of He Shikai, was still loyal to the emperor, and he intervened on the emperor's side, ordering Gao Yan's troops to disband, and they collapsed. Hulü seized Gao Yan and took him to the palace. At Hulü's urging, Gao Wei spared Gao Yan initially, although in winter 571 he nevertheless had Liu Taozhi suffocate Gao Yan, and Gao Yan's four posthumous sons were also killed. Also in winter 571, after discovering that Empress Dowager Hu had been conducting an affair with the Buddhist monk Tanxian (曇獻), he executed Tanxian and put Empress Dowager Hu under house arrest, disallowing the nobles from visiting her. In spring 572, in order to placate her, however, he posthumously honored Gao Yan with the unusual title "Emperor Gong'ai of Chu" and honored Gao Yan's wife Princess Li "Empress of Chu." Zu and Lady Lu tried to have Lady Lu made empress dowager to replace Empress Dowager Hu, but Gao Wei did not do so. Empress Dowager Hu, in order to please her son, summoned the daughter of her brother Hu Changren (胡長仁) to the palace and dressed her in the best clothes. Gao Wei saw her and was infatuated with her, and he took her as a concubine.

In 572, Empress Hulü gave birth to a daughter, and Gao Wei, wanting to please Hulü Guang, initially claimed that she gave birth to a son, but eventually had to admit that the child was a daughter. By this point, Hulü Guang was in serious conflict with the powerful officials Zu and Mu. He disliked Zu, and he often complained to his generals that Zu rarely consulted military generals. Once, when he was resting at a governmental building, Zu, who had blinded during a period of imprisonment during Emperor Wucheng's reign, rode past him without realizing that Hulü was there, and never got off the horse as demanded by customs of the time. Hulü angrily stated, "Who does he think he is?" Zu, realizing that Hulü disliked him, bribed Hulü's servant and asked the servant about Hulü's opinion of him. The servant stated, "Ever since you came into power, the Minister Prince [a reference to Hulü, as Hulü carried the title of Prince of Xianyang] each night sighed and stated, "With a blind man in power, the empire will surely be destroyed." Meanwhile, Mu had once requested to marry Hulü's daughter by a concubine, but Hulü refused. Further, when Mu requested that Gao Wei grant him the public fields at Jinyang, Hulü publicly opposed the action as being detrimental to the grazing of the army's horses. Zu and Mu therefore both despited Hulü. They therefore fostered suspicion of Hulü in the emperor's mind, and that suspicion was exacerbated by the fact that Empress Hulü was not favored by Gao Wei.

At the same time, the Northern Zhou general Wei Xiaokuan, wanting to try to exploit Gao Wei's suspicions, decided to try to create a sense that Hulü would rebel. He wrote two songs in couplets, one of which read:

A hundred sheng [(升, a measurement unit -- and 100 sheng made up one hu (斛))] will fly up to the heavens,
A bright moon [(明月, mingyue, Hulü's courtesy name)] will shine over Chang'an [Northern Zhou's capital].

The other read:

The high [(高, gao)] mountain will collapse on its own,
The daimyo oak [(槲, hu)] will stand straight on its own.

He sent spies to spread the songs near Yecheng, and the songs soon became popular. Zu, exploiting the situation himself, added two more lines:

The blind man will bear a great axe,
The talkative woman will be unable to speak.

Both Zu and Lady Lu then reported the song to Gao Wei to further foster his suspicion of Hulü. Gao Wei consulted another favorite, Han Zhangluan, who believed that he should not suspect Hulü, so Gao Wei initially took no action. Zu, however, would not relent, and he had Hulü's subordinate Feng Shirang (封士讓) make a secret submission indicating that when Hulü had brought the army close to Yecheng in 571, he was plotting a coup. Gao Wei believed it this time, and under Zu's suggestion, he awarded Hulü a horse, and then, as Hulü arrived at the palace to thank the emperor, he had Liu Taozhi seize Hulü and strangle him to death. Hulü's clan was nearly all slaughtered—including his brother and fellow general Hulü Xian (斛律羨) and his sons Hulü Wudu (斛律武都), Hulü Shixiong (斛律世雄), and Hulü Hengqie (斛律恆伽). Only his grandson Hulü Zhong (斛律鍾), who was only a few years old, was spared. Empress Hulü was deposed and confined to a subsidiary palace.

== Late reign ==
After Empress Hulü was deposed, Lady Lu wanted Consort Mu to be empress, but Empress Dowager Hu wanted her niece Empress Hu to be empress. She, however, did not believe she had enough persuasive power, and so she had to flatter Lady Lu and give her gifts. Lady Lu also saw that Gao Wei favored Empress Hu, and so agree to jointly suggest, with Zu Ting, that Consort Hu be created empress, and Gao Wei did so. He favored Empress Hu so greatly that he made clothes for her out of pearls, although those clothes were later destroyed in a fire. However, Lady Lu did not relent in her hopes of making Consort Mu empress, stating to Gao Wei, "How can a son be crown prince and a mother be a servant girl, a concubine?" But as Gao Wei favored Empress Hu, she could not carry out her wishes. She therefore engaged witches to use witchcraft on Empress Hu. It was said that within a month, Empress Hu began to show symptoms of psychosis, often mumbling to herself or laughing without cause. Gao Wei began to fear and dislike her. In winter 572, Lady Lu put Consort Mu in empress clothing and put her in a tent, surrounded with magnificent jewelry, and then told Gao Wei, "Let me show you a holy woman." When Gao Wei saw that it was Consort Mu, Lady Lu stated, "For a woman this beautiful not to be empress, who would be qualified to be empress?" Gao Wei agreed with her, and he created Consort Mu "Right Empress" and gave Empress Hu the title "Left Empress. Around the new year 573, Lady Lu further falsely told Empress Dowager Hu that Empress Hu had denigrated Empress Dowager Hu's moral character—and Empress Dowager Hu, in anger, without verifying the information, ordered Empress Hu expelled from the palace, and then had Gao Wei depose her. Thereafter, it was said that Lady Lu and Mu Tipo were so powerful and so corrupt that they were openly taking bribes and selling the imperial offices, and all that they wished were carried out. By spring 573, Mu Tipo, Gao Anagong, and Han Zhanglauan were referred to as "the Three Nobles", and they controlled the government. The issue of corruption became severe, and with Gao Wei himself living in luxury and waste, constantly building palaces and tearing them down and rebuilding them, the Northern Qi imperial treasury was at a state of exhaustion.

In spring 573, Gao Wei created Right Empress Mu sole empress.

Also in spring 573, Zu Ting, knowing that Gao Wei had a love of literature, with Gao Wei's approval, established the Wenlin Hall (文林館), headed by the officials Li Delin and Yan Zhitui (顏之推). They retained a group of literarily-capable men and authored one of the great compendia of the era, the Xiuwendian Yulan (修文殿御覽).

In summer 573, rival Emperor Xuan of Chen launched a major attack across the Yangtze River, commanded by the general Wu Mingche. Gao Wei went against the advice of the officials Wang Hong (王紘), who advocated passive resistance while reducing tax burdens to strengthen the people's resolve, and Zhao Yanshen, who advocated commissioning the Liang dynasty general Wang Lin, who had long wanted to reestablish Liang at Chen's expense, with an army. Rather, Gao Wei sent reinforcements to the attacked provinces—but only in small amounts, not sufficient to resist Chen forces—with the main force commanded by Wei Pohu (尉破胡) and Zhangsun Honglüe (長孫洪略) defeated by Wu's troops. Wang, who accompanied Wei as a consultant, was then ordered to go to Shouyang (壽陽, in modern Lu'an, Anhui) to defend that city against attack—but with severe limitations on his authority. Soon, Shouyang fell, and Wang was captured and executed by Wu. All of Northern Qi's territory between the Yangtze and the Huai River fell into Chen control. Despite the losses, however, Mu Tipo and Han advocated continued epicurean lifestyle on Gao Wei's and their own parts, with Mu famously stating, "Even if we lost all territory south of the Yellow River, we can still be like Qiuzi (龜茲, a city state in modern Xinjiang). But what is more piteous is that a human life is like borrowed time, and we should use all this short period to seek pleasure. Why worry about Shouyang?" Gao Wei agreed, and continued to spend his days feasting.

During the Chen attack, Zu, who had become embroiled in conflict with Lady Lu, Mu Tipo, and Han, was expelled from the central government over his attempt to impose a reform regime to streamline the government and reduce expenses. He would not return, and after his departure, the government became even more inefficient than before. Further, also during the campaign, Gao Wei became suspicious of his cousin Gao Changgong (高長恭) the Prince of Lanling, a capable general, and poisoned Gao Changgong to death.

Also during the Chen attack, another major wrongful massacre was carried out at Gao Wei's orders. Gao Wei was intending to visit the secondary capital Jinyang (晉陽, in modern Taiyuan, Shanxi), which he and his predecessors did on a regular basis. The senior officials Cui Jishu (崔季舒) and Zhang Diao (張雕) -- who had been Gao Wei's teacher previously and respected by him—believed that for Gao Wei to go to Jinyang would be misinterpreted by the populace as a flight to Jinyang, and would lead to popular panic, so they, with a number of other officials—including Feng Xiaoyan (封孝琰), Liu Ti (劉逖), Pei Ze (裴澤), and Guo Zun (郭遵) -- submitted a joint petition requesting Gao Wei to stay at Yecheng. Han suggested that these officials were in fact intending to rebel, and Gao Wei agreed, executing Cui, Zhang, Feng, Liu, Pei, and Guo. He further exiled their clan members, confiscated their women, and castrated their boys.

In spring 574, Gao Sihao (高思好) the Prince of Nan'an and governor of Shuo Province (朔州, roughly modern Shuozhou, Shanxi), angry that he had been disrespected by Gao Wei's servant Zhuogu Guangbian (斫骨光弁), rebelled. Gao Wei sent Tang Yong to resist Gao Sihao while personally leading the next army north, but before he could get there, Gao Sihao was defeated, and he committed suicide by drowning.

Meanwhile, around this time, Gao Wei had become less attracted to Empress Mu, instead becoming more infatuated with Empress Mu's servant girl Feng Xiaolian, making her an imperial consort. They went everywhere together, and they swore to live and to die together.

The historian Sima Guang, in his Zizhi Tongjian, had this to say about Gao Wei and his reign:

The ruler of Qi was not a good speaker and could not speak clearly, and so he did not like to meet with governmental officials. He spoke nothing to anyone except his jesters and servants. He was weak in his personality and was fearful of people staring at him. Even the most honored officials or the head of the government were not allowed to look at him, and therefore the officials could only make summary reports and then withdraw in panic. He inherited the luxurious and wasteful living habits of Emperor Wucheng and thought that this was proper. All of the women and eunuchs of the palace dressed in the best silk and ate delicacies. It sometimes took 10,000 pi [匹, a measurement unit for textile] to make one skirt for them. Each of them competed with each other for the newest and most wonderful things, and clothes made in the morning may be considered old and out of style that same evening. He spent much effort on building palaces and gardens of the greatest splendor, but his affections for them could not last, so all buildings were torn down and rebuilt and torn down again. These construction activities went around the clock without ceasing, with great torches used for illumination at night, and water boiled to mix with the dirt in the winter. In order to carve Buddha images in the western hills of Jinyang, over 10,000 torches were used for one night, bright enough to shine on the Jinyang Palace like it was the day. Whenever there were natural disastrous, ill omens, or agrarian rebellions, he never blamed himself, but would only hold great vegetarian feasts to treat the Buddhist and Taoist monks, believing that this would bring divine blessings so that difficulties would pass. He liked to play the pipa and sing, and he wrote a song entitled, Song of No Worries (無愁曲), with several hundred servants singing with him, leading to the people referring to him as "the Son of Heaven with no worries." He established "the Pauper Boy's Village" within the Hualin Garden (華林園), where he would put on pauper clothes and beg in the village, believing that this was great joy. He also built models of the important border cities and had soldiers act like Northern Zhou soldiers to attack them, and with him resisting the attacks with the eunuchs.

His favorite servants Lu Lingxuan, Mu Tipo, Gao Anagong, and Han Zhangluan controlled the government. The eunuchs Deng Changyong (鄧長顒) and Chen Dexin (陳德信), and the Xiongnu He Hongzhen (何洪珍) also participated in the important decisionmaking. Each of them brought their friends and relatives into the government and promoted them beyond proper bounds. The officials' promotions were all dependent on the amount of bribes they paid; those who submitted bribes were promoted and those who did not were demoted. The judges issue their verdicts depending on bribes as well, with the rich allowed to live and the poor sentenced to death. The officials compete in their corruption and flattery, to the detriment of the people. The servants, such as Liu Taozhi, were promoted to great honors and created princes. Almost 10,000 of such persons as eunuchs, Xiongnu, singers, dancers, magicians, and slaves, received honors beyond propriety. Hundreds of non-members of the imperial Gao clan received creations as princes. The high rank of Kaifu (開府) included more than 1,000, and the rank of Yitong (儀同) was filled innumerably. There were more than 20 generals of the imperial guards. There were tens of imperial attendants. Even dogs, horses, eagles, and hunting cocks received official posts, and were allowed to enjoy the food portions of their salaries. The servants attended the emperor at all times and think of nothing but to please the emperor. A musical can cost over 100 million coins. Later, after the imperial treasury was exhausted, he used the commanderies and counties as awards, giving two to three commanderies or six to seven counties at each time, to allow the servants to auction off the governor and magistrate posts and pocket the proceeds. Therefore, the commandery governors and county magistrates were largely wealthy merchants who find ways to extract and extort from the people, and the people could not live.

Emperor Wu of Northern Zhou had long wanted to destroy Northern Qi, and he launched a major attack in fall 575. Several of his generals suggested attacking Jinyang, but he instead attacked Luoyang. However, when he laid siege to the fortress Zhongtan (second character not in Unicode), it was well-defended by the Northern Qi general Fu Fu (傅伏), and Emperor Wu became ill during the siege and withdrew. During the meantime, however, Chen forces, commanded by Wu, commenced a new attack, putting Pengcheng (彭城, in modern Xuzhou, Jiangsu) under siege. (For the rest of Northern Qi's existence, however, Wu would not be able to actually capture Pengcheng.)

In winter 576, Northern Zhou's Emperor Wu again launched another major attack on Northern Qi, putting Pingyang (平陽, in modern Linfen, Shanxi) under siege and then capturing it. At the time the news of Northern Zhou's attack on Pingyang arrived, Gao Wei was hunting at Qilian Lake (祁連池, in modern Xinzhou, Shanxi) with Consort Feng, and Gao Anagong, not believing the matter to be serious, did not report the news to Gao Wei. Only after Pingyang fell did Gao Anagong give Gao Wei the news. Gao Wei gathered his troops and headed for Pingyang, and Emperor Wu, believing Gao Wei's troops to be still strong, withdrew but put the general Liang Shiyan (梁士彥) in charge of defending Pingyang against the Northern Qi counterattack. The Northern Qi forces sieged Pingyang with all effort—and after several days, were able to breach the wall—but at this point, Gao Wei stopped his attack and summoned Consort Feng so she could witness the fall of the city. When she arrived, however, Northern Zhou forces had already filled in the breach, and therefore held the city. With Pingyang under siege, Emperor Wu launched another attack to try to lift the siege on Pingyang. Gao Anagong advised against direct faceoff with Emperor Wu's troops, but Gao Wei, egged on by eunuchs, chose to directly engage Emperor Wu, and the armies engaged in a battle around year 577. A minor fallback by some of Gao Wei's troops caused Consort Feng and Mu Tipo to panic, and they suggested an immediate retreat—and Gao Wei abandoned his troops and fled to Jinyang, causing his army to collapse.

Once at Jinyang, instead of preparing for resistance, Gao Wei instead planned to have his cousins Gao Yanzong the Prince of Ande and Gao Xiaoheng (高孝珩) the Prince of Guangning defend Jinyang, planning to himself flee north to Shuo Province, against Gao Yanzong's advice. He first sent Empress Dowager Hu and Gao Heng to Shuo Province. When Northern Zhou forces arrived at Jinyang, he left Jinyang under Gao Yanzong's command and fled, initially intending to flee to Shuo Province or Tujue, but after persuasion by the general Mei Shenglang (梅勝郎), headed back to Yecheng, accompanied by Gao Anagong. Meanwhile, Mu Tipo abandoned Gao Wei and surrendered to Northern Zhou. His mother Lady Lu committed suicide, and his family members were all either executed or sentenced to hard labor. Meanwhile, Tang Yong, still at Jinyang, along with other generals, persuaded Gao Yanzong to take the throne himself—stating to him that if he did not, they could not die for him. When Gao Wei heard this news, he commented, "I would rather that Bing Province [the province containing Jinyang] fall into Zhou's hands than Ande's hands." Soon, Northern Zhou forces put Jinyang under siege, and they were able to breach the defenses at the east gate—but a counterattack by Gao Yanzong's troops led to a major rout against Northern Zhou forces, in which Emperor Wu almost died. However, Gao Yanzong's troops went into celebration and could not regroup. The next day, another Northern Zhou attack finally captured the city.

Once Gao Wei arrived at Yecheng, he ordered that high rewards be posted for people who would join the army, but he himself was unwilling to contribute treasures from his own palace holdings. Further, when he was giving a speech intending to raise morale, his irreverent attitude instead infuriated the generals. The generals and the officials all lost the will to fight. The official Gao Mai (高勱), who had escorted Empress Dowager Hu and Crown Prince Heng back from Shuo Province, suggested making one last stand at Yecheng, but Gao Wei did not accept his suggestion. When astrologers indicated that the imperial seat is about to be changed, he decided to pass the throne to Gao Heng and did so in spring 577, even though Gao Heng was only seven years old. Gao Wei himself took the title of Taishang Huang.

== As retired emperor ==
Gao Wei continued to exercise imperial authority, even though Gao Heng was emperor. He honored his mother Empress Dowager Hu as Grand Empress Dowager, while Empress Mu took the title of empress dowager. Meanwhile, the official Moduolou Jingxian (莫多婁敬顯) and the general Wei Xiangyuan (尉相願) plotted to try to have Gao Anagong killed, and then declare Gao Xiaoheng emperor, but the plot dissolved when the ambush they set in place for Gao Anagong could not be carried out. Meanwhile, Gao Xiaoheng requested an army so that he could resist Northern Zhou, but Gao Anagong and Han Zhangluan, suspecting him of plotting a coup, sent him out to be the governor of Cang Province (滄州, roughly modern Cangzhou, Hebei).

Meanwhile, Gao Wei, receiving news that Northern Zhou forces were about to arrive at Yecheng, decided to abandon Yecheng and head to the provinces south of the Yellow River to organize a resistance—but that if the resistance would fail, to flee to Chen. He left the general Murong Sanzang (慕容三藏) in charge of Yecheng and fled toward Ji Province (濟州, roughly modern Liaocheng, Shandong), where had earlier sent Grand Empress Dowager Hu, Empress Dowager Mu, and the emperor Gao Heng. Once Gao Wei left, Murong Sanzang was unable to defend the city, and it fell.

When Gao Wei arrived at Ji Province, he issued an edict in Gao Heng's name further passing the throne to Gao Wei's uncle Gao Jie (高湝) the Prince of Rencheng, sending the edict and the imperial seal to Gao Jie at Ying Province (瀛州, roughly modern eastern Baoding, Hebei) with the official Hulü Xiaoqing (斛律孝卿), where Gao Jie was governor. However, instead of delivering the edict and the imperial seals to Gao Jie, Hulü surrendered to Northern Zhou. Meanwhile, Gao Wei left Grand Empress Dowager Hu and Gao Anagong at Ji Province while further fleeing with Empress Dowager Mu, Consort Feng, Gao Heng, Han, and Deng Changyu further east to Qing Province (青州, roughly modern Qingzhou, Shandong). He planned to further flee to Chen, but Gao Anagong, who had been in communications with Northern Zhou forces and was planning to offer Gao Wei as a prize, fed him false information to slow him down. When Northern Zhou forces arrived at Ji Province, Gao Anagong surrendered, allowing Northern Zhou forces to quickly descend on Qing Province. Gao Wei quickly tried to flee, but was captured by the Northern Zhou general Yuchi Qin (尉遲勤) and delivered back to Yecheng, to Emperor Wu.

== Death ==
Emperor Wu initially treated Gao Wei with respect, personally greeting him and treating him as an honored guest. Meanwhile, Gao Jie and Gao Xiaoheng made an attempt to resist Northern Zhou at Cang Province, and when Emperor Wu had Gao Wei send an edict to Gao Jie to order his surrender, Gao Jie refused. However, Emperor Wu's brother Yuwen Xian the Prince of Qi quickly defeated Gao Jie and Gao Xiaoheng, capturing them and largely ending resistance, although Gao Wei's cousin Gao Shaoyi the Prince of Fanyang (Emperor Wenxuan's son) fled to Tujue, and Tujue's Tuobo Khan put Gao Shaoyi under his protection and soon had him declare himself Northern Qi's emperor, albeit in exile.

In summer 577, Emperor Wu returned with Gao Wei, as well as the princes and officials of Northern Qi, putting Gao Wei at the front of the victory procession. He also ceremonially offered Gao Wei and the other captives to the ancestors at the ancestral temple, but did not harm them at this point. He created Gao Wei the Duke of Wen.

In winter 577, Emperor Wu, apprehensive of the Gao clan, falsely accused Gao Wei of plotting rebellion with Mu Tipo, and then ordered him and other members of the Gao clan to commit suicide. Only Gao Wei's developmentally disabled brother Gao Renying (高仁英) and mute brother Gao Renya (高仁雅) were spared, but were exiled to modern Sichuan. Only during the regency of Yang Jian over Emperor Wu's grandson Emperor Jing of Northern Zhou were members of the Gao clan, including Gao Wei, properly buried north of Chang'an.

== Era names ==
- Tiantong (天統 tiān tǒng) 565–569
- Wuping (武平 wǔ píng) 570–576
- Longhua (隆化 lóng huà) 576

== Family ==
Consorts and Issue:

- Empress, of the Hulü clan (皇后 斛律氏)
  - A daughter (b. 572)
- Empress, of the Hu clan of Anding (皇后 安定胡氏), first cousin
- Empress, of the Mu clan (皇后 穆氏; 557–577), personal name Xieli (邪利)
  - Gao Heng, Emperor (皇帝 高恆; 570–578), first son
- Pure Consort, of the Feng clan (淑妃 馮氏), personal name Xiaolian (小憐)
- Zhaoyi, of the Cao clan
- Zhaoyi, of the Dong clan
- Furen, of the Wang clan (夫人 王氏)
  - A son
- Unknown
  - Gao Ke, Prince of Dongping (東平王 高恪; d. 572), second son
  - Gao Shande (高善德), third son
  - Gao Maide (高買德), fourth son
  - Gao Zhiqian (高質錢), fifth son
  - A daughter who married Han Xing, Duke Nanyang (韓興)

Chinese royalty
Preceded by Emperor Wucheng of Northern Qi	Emperor of Northern Qi (most regions); 565–577	Succeeded by Gao Heng
Preceded by Emperor Wucheng of Northern Qi	Emperor of Northern Qi (Shanxi); 565–577	Succeeded by Gao Yanzong (Prince of Ande)
