= Empress Dowager Hu (Northern Qi) =

Empress Hu (胡皇后, personal name unknown; died after 581) was an empress consort and empress dowager of the Chinese Northern Qi dynasty. Her husband was Emperor Wucheng (Gao Zhan). She was the empress dowager during the reign of her son Gao Wei. Hu was known to be debauched and promiscuous, having multiple love affairs even with eunuchs. Even after the Northern Qi was overthrown by the Northern Zhou, she continued to have affairs with the new emperors until she died during the Sui dynasty.

== Background ==
Her father was the Northern Wei official Hu Yanzhi (胡延之), and her mother was the daughter of Lu Daoyue (盧道約). She was not Gao Zhan's first wife, as Gao Zhan, then the Duke of Changguang under Eastern Wei, married a daughter of the Rouran Khan Yujiulü Anluochen, titled the Princess Linhe, in 544 as his wife. It is not known whether he later divorced the Princess Linhe or if she died. During the reign of Gao Zhan's brother Emperor Wenxuan, the first emperor of Northern Qi, Gao Zhan, then the Prince of Changguang, married Lady Hu as his wife. They had two sons, Gao Wei and Gao Yan.

== As empress consort and "retired empress" ==
Gao Zhan took the throne (as Emperor Wucheng) in 561 upon the death of another brother, Emperor Xiaozhao. He named her empress and named her son Gao Wei crown prince. However, both Emperor Wucheng and she favored their other son, Gao Yan, more, believing him to be more intelligent and resolute.

Empress Hu was alleged to be promiscuous, even during Emperor Wucheng's reign. She was said to have initially engaged in sexual relations with her eunuchs—although, in light of their being previously castrated, the traditional historians used the term xiexia (褻狎, "immoral games") rather than "adultery" to describe her acts with them. Later, with one of his officials, He Shikai, gaining great favors with him and allowed to enter the palace at all times, she engaged in a sexual relationship with He Shikai.

In 565, Emperor Wucheng, believing in astrological signs that the imperial reign would be changed, passed the throne to Gao Wei. He took the title of Taishang Huang (retired emperor), while granting Empress Hu the title of Taishang Huanghou ("retired empress"). However, matters of state were still decided by him rather than the nine-year-old Gao Wei. During this period, Gao Yan was initially named the Prince of Dongping and then the Prince of Langye. Because of the retired emperor's and empress' great favor toward Gao Yan, he became exceedingly honored, and at times he would question his parents as to why his brother, who was weaker in personality than he was, was emperor. Emperor Wucheng and Empress Hu at times considered deposing Gao Wei and making Gao Yan emperor, but ultimately did not do so.

In spring 568, Emperor Wucheng became ill, but after treatment by the medically talented official Xu Zhicai (徐之才), recovered. In winter 568, however, the illness returned, and he quickly tried to summon Xu, who was then the governor of Yan Province (兗州, roughly modern Jining, Shandong), to the capital Yecheng (鄴城, in modern Handan, Hebei), but died before Xu could arrive. Thereafter, Empress Hu assumed the title of empress dowager.

== As empress dowager ==
Emperor Wucheng entrusted the affairs of state to He Shikai, and he remained powerful after Emperor Wucheng's death. In spring 569, other officials, including Emperor Wucheng's cousin Gao Rui (高叡) the Prince of Zhao Commandery, Emperor Wucheng's brother Gao Run (高潤) the Prince of Fengyi, Emperor Wucheng's nephew Gao Yanzong (高延宗) the Prince of Ande, Lou Dingyuan (婁定遠), and Gao Wenyao (高文遙), all suggested that He Shikai be sent out of the capital to become a provincial governor. Initially, Empress Dowager Hu felt compelled to agree, but after further consultation with He Shikai, she instead killed Gao Rui and exiled Lou, while keeping He Shikai in power. Meanwhile, her lady in waiting, Gao Wei's wet nurse Lu Lingxuan, was also becoming powerful, as she gained Empress Dowager Hu's favor by flattering Empress Dowager Hu.

In 571, Gao Yan, offended by He Shikai, who feared his power and wanted to demote him to a provincial governorship, arrested He Shikai and executed him. However, when his associates, including Empress Dowager Hu's brother-in-law Feng Zicong (馮子琮), encouraged him to further seize the reins of imperial government, he hesitated—and his troops dissipated when the powerful general Hulü Guang, the father of Gao Wei's wife Empress Hulü, refused to side with him. Empress Dowager Hu had Feng executed, but tried to preserve Gao Yan's life by keeping him with her at all times. However, at Lu's instigation, Gao Wei decided to kill Gao Yan, and did so in winter 571 by tricking Empress Dowager Hu into believing that he was only inviting Gao Yan on a hunt. Subsequently, to placate Empress Dowager Hu, Gao Wei posthumously honored Gao Yan as "Emperor Gong'ai of Chu" and honored Gao Yan's wife Princess Li as the Empress of Chu.

After He Shikai's death, Empress Dowager Hu engaged in an affair with the Buddhist monk Tanxian (曇獻), who served as the director of Buddhist affairs in the imperial government—and the affair became so well known among monks that some monks joking referred to Tanxian as Taishang Huang. The rumors reached Gao Wei, but he initially did not believe them. Once, when he was visiting Empress Dowager Hu, however, he saw two "nuns" attending her and was aroused by them, so he ordered them to have sexual relations with him—and only upon ordering so did he discover that they were, in fact, men. He thereafter investigated and discovered Empress Dowager Hu's affair with Tanxian, and he put Tanxian and three female close associates of Empress Dowager Hu to death. Also in winter 571, he put her under house arrest and refused to allow her to meet with the nobles. (The official Zu Ting subsequently suggested deposing Empress Dowager Hu and making Lu empress dowager instead, but Gao Wei never actually followed that suggestion.)

Empress Dowager Hu, embarrassed at her disgrace, tried to placate Gao Wei. She invited the daughter of her brother Hu Changren (胡長仁) to the palace to live with her, and she beautified Lady Hu greatly and intentionally showcased her to Gao Wei. Gao Wei was pleased with Lady Hu and took her as a favored concubine. After Gao Wei, fearing that Hulü Guang was about to rebel, killed him in 572, he deposed Empress Hulü. Empress Hu wanted to make Consort Hu empress, but as she did not have sufficient persuasive power over Gao Wei, had to in turn flatter Lu to try to get her to help. Lu wanted her adoptive daughter Consort Mu Sheli, who already bore Gao Wei one son, Gao Heng, to be empress, but as she saw that Gao Wei favored Consort Hu, she went along with Empress Dowager Hu's desire and recommended Consort Hu. In fall 572, Gao Wei created Consort Hu empress. However, Lu still planned to make Consort Mu empress, and in winter 572, after further persuasion by Lu, Gao Wei initially made Consort Mu empress as well—as "right empress" while Empress Hu became "left empress."

However, Lu was not satisfied, and this time she would trick Empress Dowager Hu. Around the new year 573, she falsely stated to Empress Dowager Hu that Empress Hu had told Gao Wei, "The empress dowager's behavior is immoral and should not be followed." Empress Dowager Hu was incensed, and without verifying the information, she ordered Empress Hu be expelled from the palace, and then had Gao Wei depose her. From that point on, Lu and her son Mu Tipo dominated the palace, and it was said that even Empress Dowager Hu was under their control. Little is known about Empress Dowager Hu's activities for the next several years.

In 576, Emperor Wu of Northern Zhou launched a major attack on Northern Qi, and by spring 577 reached Yecheng's vicinity. In order to try to change his fortunes, Gao Wei passed the throne to his young son Gao Heng and took the title of Taishang Huang. Empress Dowager Hu thereafter became grand empress dowager. Soon, however, with Northern Zhou forces arriving, Gao Wei took his household and tried to flee east to either gather troops or flee to Chen Dynasty. They were captured and subsequently taken to Northern Zhou's capital Chang'an. Northern Qi's territory was entirely taken by Northern Zhou.

== After Northern Qi's destruction ==
Northern Zhou's Emperor Wu created Gao Wei the Duke of Wen. However, later in 577, feeling insecure about the Gao clan, he accused them of plotting treason with Mu Tipo, and massacred nearly all members of the Gao clan. Empress Dowager Hu was not killed, and indeed, she behaved in a very debauched manner. She died during the Kaihuang era of the reign of Emperor Wen of Sui (581–600), but the exact year is not known.

Chinese royalty
Preceded by Empress Yuan	Empress of Northern Qi; 561–565	Succeeded by Empress Hulü
