= Nurse empress dowager =

Honorific title in ancient China

Nurse empress dowager (Chinese: 保太后; pinyin: Bǎo Tàihòu) was an honorific title given to emperors' wet nurses of the Xianbei-led Chinese Northern Wei dynasty. The existence of the title owed itself to a peculiar institution of Northern Wei—that when a son of the emperor were to be made crown prince, his mother, if alive, must be forced to commit suicide. The crown princes were therefore raised by wet nurses, and when they became emperors, they would typically honor their wet nurses as nurse empress dowagers. Often, later in their reigns, they would then honor their wet nurses as full empress dowagers, and they often had just as much influence as the emperors' mothers would have had—rendering the rationale for the Northern Wei institution of putting mothers to death (that therefore empress dowagers would not dominate the political scene) somewhat ineffective.
