= Han Zhangluan =

Han Zhangluan (Chinese: 韓長鸞), formal personal name Han Feng (韓鳳), was an official of the Chinese Northern Qi dynasty. He was initially a guard commander for Gao Wei when Gao Wei was crown prince, and became a close associate of Gao Wei after Gao Wei became emperor. Late in Gao Wei's reign, he dominated the political scene along with Mu Tipo and Gao Anagong. While not as criticized for corruption as Mu and Gao Anagong were, he was blamed by historians for his rejection of civilians and ethnic Han officials, including the killing of the officials Cui Jishu (崔季舒) and Zhang Diao (張雕) at his instigation.

Han Zhangluan was from Changli Commandery (昌黎, roughly modern Qinhuangdao, Hebei), he appeared to be ethnically Han or had mixed Xianbei–Han heritage, but the matter of his ethnicity is not conclusive. His father Han Yongxing (韓永興) was a commandery governor. In his youth, he was said to have very strong arms and was good at archery and horseriding. After Gao Wei was created crown prince in 562, his father Emperor Wucheng set up a guard corps commanded by 20 officers. Han Zhangluan was one of the officers thus commissioned, and Gao Wei immediately took a liking to him. After Gao Wei became emperor in 565, he was constantly promoted, and eventually, he was created the Prince of Changli. Both his sons Han Baoxing (韓寶行) and Han Baoxin (韓寶信) married princesses. Han was particularly powerful after the general Hulü Guang was falsely accused of treason and executed in 572, and he, Mu, and Gao Anagong were referred to as the "Three Nobles," controlling the government together, and they were later blamed for the deterioration of Northern Qi. When the Chen dynasty attacked and captured the region between the Yangtze River and Huai River in 573, including the important city Shouyang (壽陽, in modern Lu'an, Anhui), Han and Mu were gambling when news of Shouyang's fall arrived and not willing to stop despite the bad news. Further, during the Chen campaign, when Cui and Zhang, along with several other officials, including Feng Xiaoyan (封孝琰), Liu Ti (劉逖), Pei Ze (裴澤), and Guo Zun (郭遵), submitted a joint petition trying to persuade Gao Wei not to visit the secondary capital Jinyang (晉陽, in modern Taiyuan, Shanxi), on account that such a visit might be misinterpreted by the people as flight, it was Han who suggested that those civilian officials were, in effect, committing treason, and should all be killed. Gao Wei agreed and had them executed. Han was also known for his disdain for civilian officials, but was known for his good treatment of military officers who were mostly non-ethnic Chinese. He particularly despised ethnic Chinese scholars and officials, and is known for often stating, "Those naggy and cunning Chinese dogs are difficult to endure; they should all be killed!"

At one point, both Han and Mu were removed from their offices for over their diversion of imperial construction personnel from their project of repairing the palace at the secondary capital Jinyang to repairing their own homes. At the time of the major attack by Northern Zhou in 577, Gao Wei initially battled Northern Zhou forces but eventually fled back to the Northern Qi capital Yecheng (鄴城, in modern Handan, Hebei), and it was at that time he recalled Han back to government. Han subsequently fled with Gao Wei south of the Yellow River and was one of the few officials who did not surrender to Northern Zhou. Both Gao Wei and he were soon captured, however.

Many Northern Qi officials were given posts in the Northern Zhou government, but no historical record indicated that Han received any offices. In the subsequent Sui dynasty, he was made a provincial governor, and he died while serving as the governor of Long Province (隴州, roughly modern Baoji, Shaanxi), but it is not known when he died saved that it must have been before 607, when the Sui provinces were renamed commanderies.
