= Hulü Guang =

Northern Qi general (c.515 - 572)

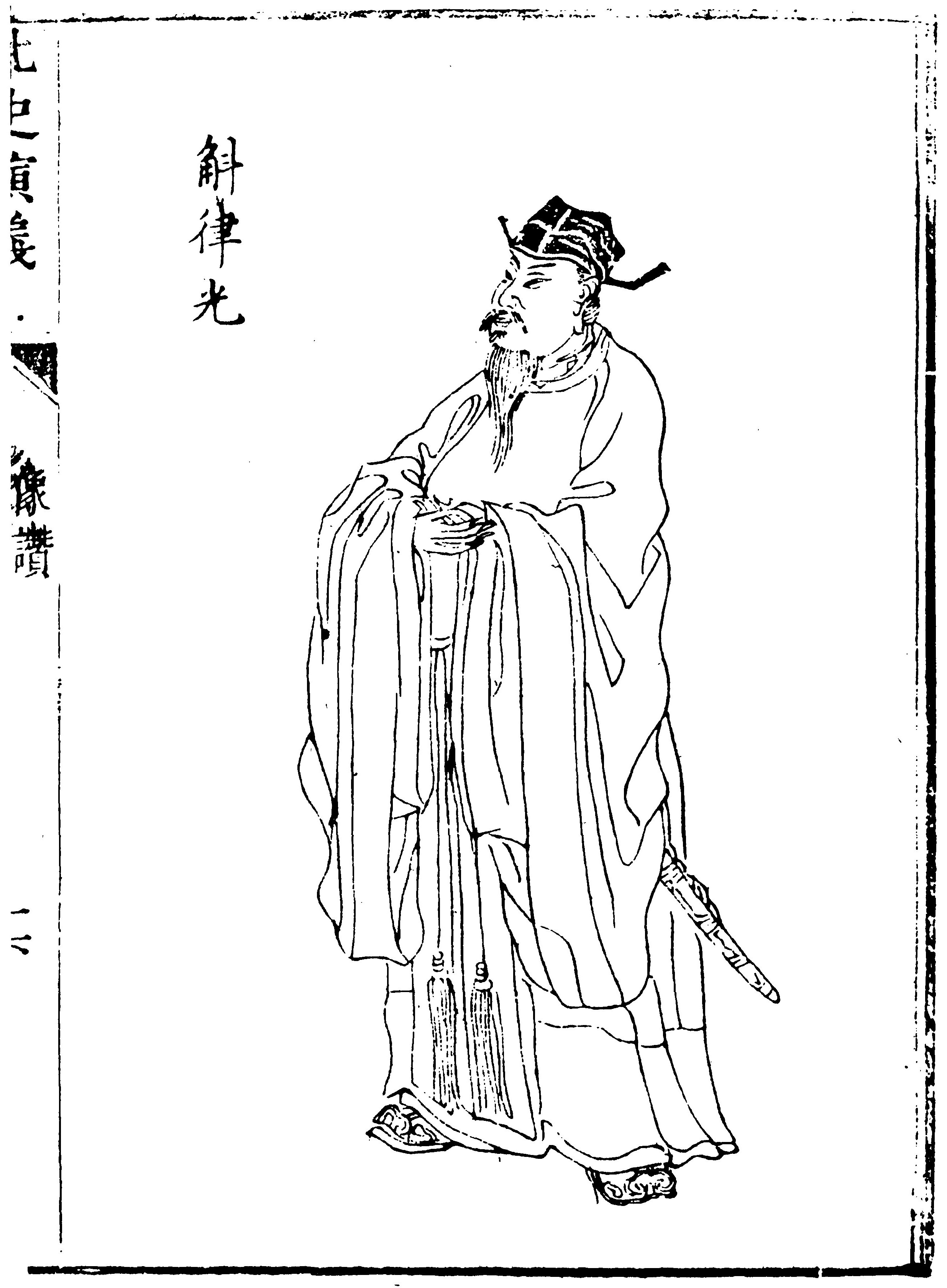
Hülü Guang

Hulü Guang (Chinese: 斛律光) (515 – 22 August 572), courtesy name Mingyue (明月), was an ethnic Tiele general of the Chinese Northern Qi dynasty. During the late years of the dynasty—the reigns of Emperor Wucheng and Gao Wei, traditionally viewed as a period of corruption and debauchery when the Northern Qi's once-powerful status was deteriorating—Hulü was viewed as the key pillar to the state and its army, maintaining the army's strength against the rivaling Northern Zhou and Chen dynasties. However, the powerful officials Zu Ting and Mu Tipo, had disagreements with him and accused him of plotting treason. In August 572, Gao Wei executed Hulü. The Emperor Wu of Northern Zhou was very glad about the news and declared a general pardon, and in 578, the Northern Qi fell to the Northern Zhou.

== Early life and career ==
Hulü Guang was born in 515. His father Hulü Jin was a Chile chieftain, subordinate to Northern Wei. Hulü Jin assisted the general Gao Huan in his campaigns to take control of the Northern Wei state, and after Gao Huan became Northern Wei's paramount general in 532, Hulü Jin became an honored general, viewed by Gao Huan in some ways more as an equal than as a subordinate, and this relationship continued after Northern Wei's division into Eastern Wei (under Gao's control) and Western Wei (under Yuwen Tai's control) in 534. Hulü Guang was probably Hulü Jin's oldest son, and in his youth, he was known for his fighting prowess, including horseriding and archery. Once, when accompanying Hulü Jin on a campaign against Western Wei, Hulü Guang hit Yuwen's secretary Mozhe Hui (莫者暉) with an arrow, leading to Mozhe's capture by Eastern Wei troops. Gao Huan was pleased and made him a general. After Gao Huan named his son Gao Cheng as his heir, Hulü Guang served on Gao Cheng's staff. In 547, Hulü Guang was created the Viscount of Yongle.

Also in 547, Gao Huan died and was succeeded as regent by Gao Cheng. Gao Cheng immediately faced a major rebellion by the general Hou Jing, and Hulü was sent to serve under Murong Shaozong, the commander of the forces Gao Cheng sent against Hou. In a rare case where Hulü might have exhibited some uncharacteristic overexuberance, when Murong and his lieutenant Liu Fengsheng (劉豐生) were initially defeated by Hou, Hulü and his fellow junior general Zhang Shixian (張恃顯) rebuked Murong and Liu for their defeat. Murong responded, "I have met many opponents, but none is as difficult as Hou. Why do you not try to engage him and see." As Hulü and Zhang rode out to engage Hou, however, Murong warned them, "Do not cross the Guo River [(渦水)]." (Murong's troops and Hou's troops were by this point stalemated across the Guo River.) When Hulü challenged Hou by showing his bow and arrows but did not cross the Guo, Hou told him, "You came for glory, but I am trying to leave in fear of death. I am your father's friend. Why shoot at me? And how do you know not to cross the Guo? It must be Murong Shaozong who taught you." Hulü was unable to respond, and Hou subsequently had his subordinate Tian Qian (田遷) shoot and kill Hulü's horse, and Hulü was forced to withdraw. Hou then captured Zhang but released him, and both Hulü and Zhang fled back to Murong's camp. Murong then stated, "What have you seen now? Do not rebuke me." (In spring 548, Murong defeated Hou, who was forced to flee to the Liang dynasty. Historical records do not indicate whether Hulü contributed to the victory.)

== During Emperor Wenxuan's reign ==
After Gao Cheng died in 549, his brother Gao Yang took over as regent, and in 550, he had Emperor Xiaojing of Eastern Wei yield the throne to him, ending Eastern Wei and establishing Northern Qi as its Emperor Wenxuan. Hulü Guang continued to serve as a general, and was created the Viscount of Xi'an. In 552, when Emperor Wenxuan made an attack against the Kumo Xi tribe (in the upper Liao River drainage area), Hulü accompanied him and contributed in the victory. Over the next few years, he served as a provincial governor on the borders with Northern Zhou, and was largely successful in border skirmishes, capturing a number of minor cities from Northern Zhou.

== During Emperors Fei's and Xiaozhao's reigns ==
In 560, after Emperor Wenxuan died and was succeeded by his son Emperor Fei, Hulü was made the governor of the important Bing Province (并州, modern central Shanxi).

Also in 560, Emperor Fei's uncle Gao Yan the Prince of Changshan, with support from, among others, Hulü Jin, killed the prime minister Yang Yin and took power. Later that year, Gao Yan's mother and Emperor Fei's grandmother Grand Empress Dowager Lou Zhaojun deposed Emperor Fei and made Gao Yan emperor (as Emperor Xiaozhao). Hulü Guang was created the Duke of Julu, and later that year, when Emperor Xiaozhao created his son Gao Bainian crown prince, Emperor Xiaozhao, on account of Hulü Guang's achievements and loyalty, took Hulü Guang's first daughter as Gao Bainian's wife and crown princess. When Emperor Xiaozhao was near death in 561, however, believing that Gao Bainian was too young, he instead passed the throne to his brother Gao Zhan the Prince of Changguang, who took the throne as Emperor Wucheng. Hulü continued to serve under Emperor Wucheng.

== During Emperor Wucheng's reign ==
In 564, Emperor Wucheng killed Gao Bainian, and subsequently, Hulü's daughter and Gao Bainian's wife Princess Hulü, in distress, refused to eat, and she died a month thereafter. It was said that she died while holding tight to a jade tablet that Gao Bainian gave her, and that no one could pry it loose even after her death, until Hulü Guang was finally able to pry it from her hand.

In spring 564, Northern Zhou, in alliance with Tujue, launched a major attack on Northern Qi, attacking the secondary capital Jinyang (晉陽, in modern Taiyuan, Shanxi) from the north and Pingyang (平陽, in modern Linfen, Shanxi) from the south. Hulü was sent to resist the southern prong, commanded by the Northern Zhou general Daxi Wu (達奚武), and was successful in his resistance. Subsequently, when Duan Shao defeated the northern prong, Hulü informed Daxi of this and induced Daxi to retreat. When Hulü subsequently rendezvoused with Emperor Wucheng at Jinyang, Emperor Wucheng, in sadness and relief, hugged Hulü's head and cried. In winter 564, Daxi again attacked, this time against the important city of Luoyang. Emperor Wucheng sent Duan, Hulü, and his nephew Gao Changgong, the Prince of Lanling to relieve Luoyang, and they defeated Northern Zhou troops, killing Daxi's lieutenant Wang Xiong (王雄), forcing Daxi to retreat. For this victory, Emperor Wucheng created Hulü with an additional title of Duke of Guanjun.

Sometime during Emperor Wucheng's reign, Emperor Wucheng had taken Hulü's second daughter as the wife and crown princess of his son, the Crown Prince Gao Wei. In 565, at the urging of the officials He Shikai and Zu Ting, Emperor Wucheng passed the throne to Gao Wei and created Crown Princess Hulü empress. (Emperor Wucheng took the title of Taishang Huang (retired emperor) and retained most of imperial powers.)

== During Gao Wei's reign ==
In summer 567, Hulü Guang's father Hulü Jin died. Hulü Guang resigned his posts to observe the customary three-year mourning period for his father, but was soon recalled to his posts by Emperor Wucheng. He inherited his father's title of Prince of Xianyang and continued to serve as chieftain of the Shule, and was also created an additional title of Duke of Wude. Around the new year 569, Emperor Wucheng died, and thereafter power was largely in the hands of his favorite (and Empress Dowager Hu's lover) He Shikai.

Around the new year 570, the Northern Zhou general Yuwen Xian put the Northern Qi city Yiyang (宜陽, in modern Luoyang, Henan) under siege, and in spring 570, Hulü was sent to resist, and he defeated Yuwen Xian. However, the stalemate near Yiyang persisted. Hulü decided to take the war to Northern Zhou elsewhere, and in winter 570, he moved north and built forts north of the Fen River (汾水, flowing through modern Linfen), taking the previously unguarded border territory into Northern Qi control. While his subsequent battles in the region against the Northern Zhou generals Yuwen Xian and Wei Xiaokuan were largely indecisive, the region continued to be held by Northern Qi. In summer 571, he moved south again and defeated the Northern Zhou forces sieging Yiyang. As he subsequently returned to the capital Yecheng, however, he received an order to demobilize his troops. As many soldiers had not received their rewards yet, he submitted a secret petition to Gao Wei, requesting the emperor to send imperial messengers to the army to honor the soldiers. Gao Wei did not act immediately, however, and the army approached Yecheng without receiving any words from the emperor. Gao Wei was displeased that Hulü Guang brought the army close to the capital, and he summoned Hulü to the palace before sending messengers to honor the soldiers and demobilizing them. Nevertheless, honoring Hulü for his victory, he created Hulü yet an additional title of Duke of Qinghe.

Later in 571, Gao Wei's brother Gao Yan (note different character than Emperor Xiaozhao) the Prince of Langye, angry at the hold that He Shikai had on power, killed him, and further mobilized his troops to consider seizing power and killing Gao Wei's wet nurse Lu Lingxuan and her son Mu Tipo, who had also become powerful. Hulü, while he approved of Gao Yan's killing of He Shikai, was still loyal to the emperor, and he intervened on the emperor's side, ordering Gao Yan's troops to disband, and they collapsed. Hulü seized Gao Yan and took him to the palace. At Hulü's urging, Gao Wei spared Gao Yan initially, although in winter 571 he nevertheless executed Gao Yan.

By this point, Hulü's position had reached the pinnacle of an imperial official's career. The historian Li Yanshou (李延寿), in his History of Northern Dynasties, described him in this way:

Hulü was stern at home, and he treated his sons and younger brothers as subordinates. Although he was greatly honored, he was frugal in his living, disliking music and beautiful women. He rarely met guests, and he refused gifts, not wanting power. At governmental meetings, he was often the last one to speak, but always spoke logically. When he was making submissions to the emperor, he would dictate them and have his assistants record them, requesting them to make the submissions concise and simple. His military strategies were in Xiongnu fashion, and at the end of the day, until the camps had been completed, he would not himself first rest. Sometimes he would not sit or strip armor off himself for an entire day. He braved the fighting on the fronts. When the soldiers commit offenses, he pounded them with his thick staff, but would not frivolously kill them. Therefore, the soldiers were willing to fight hard for him. Since his early youth, he did not lose a battle, and the rival states were all fearful of him.

== Death ==
However, by 572, Hulü was in serious conflict with the powerful officials Zu and Mu. He disliked Zu, and he often complained to his generals that Zu rarely consulted military generals. Once, when he was resting at a governmental building, Zu, who was blind, rode past him without realizing that Hulü was there, and never got off the horse as demanded by customs of the time. Hulü angrily stated, "Who does he think he is?" Zu, realizing that Hulü disliked him, bribed Hulü's servant and asked the servant about Hulü's opinion of him. The servant stated, "Ever since you came into power, the Minister Prince each night sighed and stated, 'With a blind man in power, the empire will surely be destroyed.'" Meanwhile, Mu had once requested to marry Hulü's daughter by a concubine, but Hulü refused. Further, when Mu requested that Gao Wei grant him the public fields at Jinyang, Hulü publicly opposed the action as being detrimental to the grazing of the army's horses. Zu and Mu therefore both despited Hulü. They therefore fostered suspicion of Hulü in the emperor's mind, and that suspicion was exacerbated by the fact that Empress Hulü was not favored by Gao Wei.

At the same time, the Northern Zhou general Wei Xiaokuan, wanting to try to exploit Gao Wei's suspicions, decided to try to create a sense that Hulü would rebel. He wrote two songs in couplets, one of which read:

A hundred sheng [(升, a measurement unit -- and 100 sheng made up one hu (斛))] will fly up to the heavens,
A bright moon [(明月, mingyue, Hulü's courtesy name)] will shine over Chang'an [Northern Zhou's capital].

The other read:

The high [(高, gao)] mountain will collapse on its own,
The daimyo oak [(槲, hu)] will stand straight on its own.

He sent spies to spread the songs near Yecheng, and the songs soon became popular. Zu, exploiting the situation himself, added two more lines:

The blind man will bear a great axe,
The talkative woman will be unable to speak.

Both Zu and Lady Lu then reported the song to Gao Wei to further foster his suspicion of Hulü. Gao Wei consulted another favorite, Han Zhangluan, who believed that he should not suspect Hulü, so Gao Wei initially took no action. Zu, however, would not relent, and he had Hulü's subordinate Feng Shirang (封士讓) make a secret submission indicating that when Hulü had brought the army close to Yecheng in 571, he was plotting a coup. Gao Wei believed it this time, and under Zu's suggestion, he awarded Hulü a horse, and then, as Hulü arrived at the palace to thank the emperor, he had his guard commander Liu Taozhi (劉桃枝) seize Hulü and strangle him to death.

Hulü's clan was nearly all slaughtered—including his brother and fellow general Hulü Xian (斛律羨) and his sons Hulü Wudu (斛律武都), Hulü Shixiong (斛律世雄), and Hulü Hengqie (斛律恆伽). Only his grandson Hulü Zhong (斛律鍾), who was only a few years old, was spared. Empress Hulü was deposed and confined to a subsidiary palace.

Emperor Wu of Northern Zhou was so pleased at the news of Hulü's death that he declared a general pardon. In 578, after he destroyed the Northern Qi and entered Yecheng, he commented on Hulü, "If he were still alive, how can I get here?"(此人若在,朕豈能至鄴!)

He posthumously created Hulü the Duke of Chong and had Hulü Zhong inherit the title.

== Notes and references ==
- Book of Northern Qi, vol. 17.
- History of Northern Dynasties, vol. 54.
- Zizhi Tongjian, vols. 160, 167, 168, 169, 170, 171.
