= Yuan Humo =

Yuan Humo, also known Tuoba Humo, (Chinese: 元胡摩; died 616) was an empress of the Xianbei-led Chinese Northern Zhou dynasty (although during her husband Emperor Xiaomin (Yuwen Jue)'s reign, her title was actually "princess" since he used the alternative title "Heavenly Prince" (Tian Wang)).

Yuan Humo was the fifth daughter of Emperor Wen of Western Wei, and she carried the title Princess Jin'an during the reigns of her father and her brothers Emperor Fei of Western Wei and Emperor Gong of Western Wei. Sometime after Yuwen Jue, the son and heir of then-paramount general Yuwen Tai, was created the Duke of Lüeyang in 550, she married Yuwen Jue as his duchess. After Yuwen Tai died in 556, Yuwen Jue inherited his titles, under the guardianship of Yuwen Tai's nephew Yuwen Hu. In spring 557, Yuwen Hu forced Duchess Yuan's brother Emperor Gong to yield the throne to Yuwen Jue, ending Western Wei and establishing Northern Zhou. Emperor Xiaomin, then carrying the title of Heavenly Prince, created her as his princess.

Later in 557, Emperor Xiaomin, unhappy about Yuwen Hu's hold on power, tried to have him killed. The news of the plot leaked, and Yuwen Hu deposed Emperor Xiaomin and replaced him with another son of Yuwen Tai, Emperor Ming. Soon, he had Yuwen Jue put to death. He also forced Princess Yuan to become a Buddhist nun. After another brother of Emperor Xiaomin, Emperor Wu killed Yuwen Hu in 572, he posthumously honored Emperor Xiaomin as emperor and honored her as empress, housing her at Chongyi Palace (崇義宮). She left the palace after Northern Zhou's throne was seized by Emperor Wen of Sui in 581 and lived in a private residence. She died in 616, during the reign of Emperor Wen's son Emperor Yang of Sui.

== Ancestry ==
Ancestors of Yuan Humo

Tuoba Hong, Emperor Xianwen of Northern Wei
Yuan Hong, Emperor Xiaowen of Northern Wei
Consort Li
Yuan Yu, Prince of Jingzhao
Consort Yuan
Yuan Baoju, Emperor Wen of Western Wei
Lady Yang
Yuan Humo, Princess Jin'an of Western Wei

Chinese royalty
New dynasty	Empress of Northern Zhou; 557	Succeeded by Empress Dugu
Preceded by Empress Ruogan of Western Wei	Empress of China (Western); 557	Succeeded by Empress Dugu
