= Empress Ruogan =

Empress Ruogan (若干皇后, personal name unknown) was an empress of the Xianbei-led Chinese Western Wei dynasty — a branch successor state of Northern Wei. Her husband was Emperor Gong (Yuan Kuo/Tuoba Kuo), the final emperor of the state.

She was the daughter of the general Ruogan Hui (若干惠). She was said to be beautiful, and when Yuan Kuo was the Prince of Qi, he married her as his princess. In 554, after the paramount general Yuwen Tai deposed his brother Emperor Fei, Yuwen made him emperor, and he created her empress. In 556, after Yuwen Tai's death, Yuwen Tai's nephew Yuwen Hu forced Emperor Gong to yield the throne to Yuwen Tai's son Yuwen Jue, ending Western Wei and starting Northern Zhou. The former emperor was killed in 557, and the former empress became a Buddhist nun. She died while still being a nun, although historical records did not mention when she died. For reasons unknown, Northern Zhou did not award her a posthumous name.

Chinese royalty
Preceded by Empress Yuwen	Empress of Northern Wei (Western); 554–556	Dynasty ended
Preceded by Empress Yuwen	Empress of China (Western); 554–556	Succeeded by Empress Yuan Humo of Northern Zhou
