= Duke Hui =

Duke Hui (Chinese: 惠公) is the posthumous name of some monarchs.

== List ==
- Western Zhou Duke Hui of Song (宋惠公)
- Western Zhou Duke Hui of Lai
- Eastern Zhou Duke Hui of Ying
- Eastern Zhou Duke Hui of Wey (衛惠公)
- Eastern Zhou Duke Hui of Lu (魯惠公)
- Eastern Zhou Duke Hui of Qi (惠公)
- Eastern Zhou Duke Hui I of Qin (秦惠公), reigned 500-492 BC
- Eastern Zhou Duke Hui II of Qin (秦惠公), reigned 399-387 BC
- Eastern Zhou Duke Hui of Jin (晋惠公)
- Eastern Zhou Duke Hui of Yan (燕惠公) (another posthumous name is Duke Jian)
- Eastern Zhou Duke Hui of Chen (陳惠公)
- Eastern Zhou Duke Hui of Jie (薛惠公)
- Eastern Zhou Duke Hui of Fei (费惠公)
- Eastern Zhou Duke Hui of Xiaozhou (小邾惠公)
- Eastern Zhou Duke Hui of Western Zhou (西周惠公)
- Eastern Zhou Duke Hui of Eastern Zhou (东周惠公)
- Ming dynasty Ding Guo Kang Hui Gong

== See also ==
- Emperor Hui (disambiguation)
- King Hui (disambiguation)
- Prince Hui (disambiguation)
- Emperor Wen (disambiguation)
- King Wen (disambiguation)
- Prince Wen
