= King Wen =

King Wen may refer to:

- King Wen of Zhou (died 1050 BC)
- King Wen of Chu (died 677 BC)
- Wu Rui (died 202 BC), King Wen of Changsha
- Zhao Mo (died 122 BC), King Wen of Nanyue
- Mun of Balhae
- Zheng Jing

== See also ==
- Duke Wen (disambiguation)
- Emperor Wen (disambiguation)
