= Emperor Wen =

Emperor Wen, Wendi, or the Wen Emperor may refer to:

- King Wen of Zhou (1112 BC–1050 BC),
- Emperor Wen of Han (202 BC–157 BC),
- Emperor Wen of Nanyue (175 BC–124 BC), see Zhao Mo
- Emperor Wen of Wei (187–226), see Cao Pi
- Emperor Wen of Jin (211–264), see Sima Zhao
- Emperor Wen of Eastern Wu (223–253), see Sun He
- Emperor Wen of Song (407–453)
- Emperor Wen of Western Wei (507–551)
- Emperor Wen of Northern Zhou (507–556), see Yuwen Tai
- Emperor Wen of Chen (522–566)
- Emperor Wen of Sui (541–604)

== See also ==
- Duke Hui (disambiguation)
