= Empress Xuan =

Empress Xuan may refer to:

- Middle Empress Xuan (fl. 318), consort of Liu Cong (Emperor Zhaowu of Han (Zhao))
- Zhang Yao'er (506–570), wife of Chen Baxian (Emperor Wu of Chen)
- Empress Dowager Chinu (died 574), mother of Yuwen Yong (Emperor Wu of Northern Zhou)

== See also ==
- Queen Dowager Xuan (338?–265 BC), mother of King Zhaoxiang of Qin
