= Empress Dowager Chinu =

Empress Dowager Chinu (Chinese: 叱奴太后; died 19 April 574), personal name unknown, posthumous name Empress Xuan (宣皇后), was an empress dowager of the Xianbei-led Chinese Northern Zhou dynasty. She was the mother of Emperor Wu (Yuwen Yong).

She was ethnically Xianbei, and she was a concubine of the Western Wei paramount general Yuwen Tai. Empress Dowager and Yuwen Tai had two sons, Yuwen Yong and Yuwen Zhi (宇文直). After Yuwen Yong became emperor of the Northern Zhou in May 560, he did not immediately honor her as empress dowager, but did so on 3 July 567.

The extent of Empress Dowager Chinu's influence on political matters is unclear, but she became a passive participant in Emperor Wu's plot to remove his cousin Yuwen Hu, who controlled the political scene and who had killed both of his predecessors—his brothers – Emperor Xiaomin and Emperor Ming. In 572, after a conference with Yuwen Hu, Emperor Wu invited Yuwen Hu inside the palace to meet with Empress Dowager Chinu – something that Yuwen Hu did on a regular basis. On the way, he told Yuwen Hu that Empress Dowager Chinu was having problem with alcoholism and not listening to his advice to stop her drinking, so he wanted Yuwen Hu to advise her to change her ways as well. He further gave Yuwen Hu the text of the Jiu Gao (酒誥) – an anti-alcoholism declaration written by King Cheng of Zhou – and suggested that he read the Jiu Gao to Empress Dowager Chinu. Once they reached her palace, Yuwen Hu, pursuant to Emperor Wu's request, started reading the Jiu Gao. Before he could finish it, Emperor Wu stepped behind him and used a jade tablet to strike the back of his head. Yuwen Hu fell to the ground, and Yuwen Zhi, who was hiding nearby, jumped out, and cut off Yuwen Hu's head, ending Yuwen Hu's hold on power.

Empress Dowager Chinu died in April 574. She was buried with honors due an empress, but not with Yuwen Tai, who was already buried with his wife Princess Fengyi (mother of Emperor Xiaomin and sister of Emperor Xiaowu of Northern Wei).
