= Wu of Zhou =

Wu of Zhou may refer to:

- King Wu of Zhou (fl. 11th century BC)
- Emperor Wu of Zhou (543–578), emperor of Northern Zhou
- Empress Wu of Zhou (624–705), or Wu Zetian
