= Empress Yuwen =

Empress Yuwen (宇文皇后, personal name unknown) (died 554?) was an empress of the Xianbei-led Chinese Western Wei dynasty — a branch successor state of Northern Wei. Her husband was Emperor Fei (Yuan Qin), and her father was Western Wei's paramount general Yuwen Tai.

The future empress, in her youth, was known for making and displaying the drawings of women, and she was thought to be talented. Yuwen Tai once commented that seeing her always comforted him. While Yuan Qin was crown prince under his father Emperor Wen, he married her as crown princess. After Emperor Wen's death in 551, he became emperor, and he created her empress, although it is unclear whether he immediately did so. It was recorded that he loved and respected her greatly, and he had no concubines.

In 554, Emperor Fei, angry that Yuwen Tai had put the official Yuan Lie (元烈) to death in 553, secretly plotted to kill Yuwen Tai. The plot was discovered, and Yuwen Tai deposed him, and soon had him killed. According to the History of Northern Dynasties, Empress Yuwen "also suffered disaster because she was faithful to Wei's imperial house," but did not give greater elaboration as to how or why she died, nor is it completely clear that she died in the same year her husband did.

Chinese royalty
Preceded by Empress Yujiulü	Empress of Northern Wei (Western); 551?–554	Succeeded by Empress Ruogan
Preceded by Empress Yujiulü	Empress of China (Western); 551?–554	Succeeded by Empress Ruogan
Preceded by Empress Zhang of Liang	Empress of China (Southwestern); 553–554	Succeeded by Empress Ruogan
