= Huizong =

Huizong are different temple names used for emperors of China. It may refer to:

- Wang Yanjun (died 935, reigned 928–935), emperor of the Min dynasty
- Emperor Huizong of Western Xia (1060–1086, reigned 1067–1086), emperor of Western Xia
- Emperor Huizong of Song (1082–1135, reigned 1100–1126), emperor of the Song dynasty
- Toghon Temür (1320–1370, reigned 1333–1370), emperor of the Yuan dynasty
- Jianwen Emperor (1377–?, reigned 1398–1402), emperor of the Ming dynasty

== See also ==
- Emperor Hui (disambiguation)
