= Marquis Wen =

Marquis Wen or Marquess Wen may refer to these ancient Chinese rulers:

- Marquis Wen of Jin (805–746 BC)
- Marquess Wen of Wei (died 396 BC)
- Marquess Wen of Han (died 377 BC)

== See also ==
- Duke Wen (disambiguation)
