= Yuwen Hu =

Northern Zhou prince (513–572)

Yuwen Hu Duke Dang of Jin
- 宇文護

Regent of Northern Zhou
- In office 556 – 14 April 572
- Monarchs: Yuwen Jue; Yuwen Yu; Yuwen Yong

Personal details
- Born: 513
- Died: 14 April 572 (aged 58–59)
- Relatives: Yuwen Tai (uncle); Yuwen Yu (first cousin); Yuwen Jue (first cousin); Yuwen Yong (first cousin); Yuwen Xian (first cousin); Empress Yuwen (first cousin)

Yuwen Hu (Chinese: 宇文護; 513 – 14 April 572), courtesy name Sabao (薩保, also a title, which can be traced back to sartpāw “caravan leader”, but was used as given name, in many cases by Buddhists - referring to the metaphorical meaning of wise leader), posthumous name Duke Dang of Jin (晉蕩公), was a regent of the Xianbei-led Northern Zhou dynasty of China. He first came into prominence as the nephew of Western Wei's paramount general Yuwen Tai, and after Yuwen Tai's death in 556, he became the guardian to Yuwen Tai's son Yuwen Jue.

In 557, he forced Emperor Gong of Western Wei to yield the throne to Yuwen Jue (Emperor Xiaomin), establishing the Northern Zhou dynasty. However, Yuwen Hu dominated the political scene, and after Emperor Xiaomin tried to seize power later that year, he killed Emperor Xiaomin and replaced him with another son of Yuwen Tai, Emperor Ming. In 560, he poisoned Emperor Ming, who was succeeded by another son of Yuwen Tai, Emperor Wu. In 572, Emperor Wu ambushed Yuwen Hu and killed him, personally taking power.

== Background ==
Yuwen Hu was born in 513 as a son of Yuwen Hao (宇文顥), who was a son of the local peasant leader Yuwen Gong (宇文肱) at Wuchuan (武川, in modern Hohhot, Inner Mongolia). His mother was Lady Yan, who was probably Yuwen Hao's wife. He was said to be particularly bright as a child and was favored by Yuwen Gong. In 524, with Northern Wei's northern provinces engulfed in peasant rebellions, Yuwen Gong and his sons, along with another local leader, Heba Duba (賀拔度拔) and his sons, led a counter-rebellion against one of the major rebels, Poliuhan Baling (破六韓拔陵), who had taken Wuchuan earlier, and they killed Poliuhan's general Wei Kegu (衛可孤), temporarily restoring order. However, soon Yuwen Gong and his sons were forced to flee and join the army of another rebel leader, Xianyu Xiuli (鮮于修禮). It was while serving under Xianyu that Yuwen Gong died in battle, and it was probably also at the same time that Yuwen Hao died as well. After Xianyu Xiuli was killed by his general Yuan Hongye (元洪業) in 526, another general, Ge Rong, in turn, killed Yuan and took over Xianyu's troops, and Yuwen Hu stayed with his uncles in Ge's army. In 528, after Ge was defeated by Northern Wei's paramount general Erzhu Rong, Erzhu forcibly moved Ge's troops, including the Yuwens, to his power base at Jinyang (晉陽, in modern Taiyuan, Shandong), where he remained for several years.

In 531 or 532, when Yuwen Hu's uncle Yuwen Tai was serving under the general Heba Yue (Heba Duba's son) in the western provinces, Yuwen Hu went to join Yuwen Tai at Pingliang. (When he did so, he left both his mother Lady Yan and his aunt (Yuwen Hao's sister) at Jinyang.) As Yuwen Tai had no sons at that point, when he was out on military campaigns, he entrusted his household to Yuwen Hu. Yuwen Hu was said not to be strict as the household's governor but was nevertheless able to keep the household organized and solemn. Yuwen Tai, when he saw this, stated, "this child's ambitions and talents are like mine." In 533, when Heba added the strategically important Xia Province (夏州, roughly modern Yulin, Shaanxi) to the ones he controlled, he made Yuwen Tai its governor. Yuwen Tai left Yuwen Hu to serve under Heba. When Heba's associate Houmochen Yue assassinated Heba in early 534, Heba's generals invited Yuwen Tai to serve as their commander, and he agreed. In the subsequent armed confrontation with Houmochen (in which Yuwen Tai defeated Houmochen, causing Houmochen to kill himself), Yuwen Hu served as one of his uncle's generals.

== During Western Wei ==
In 534, displeased at the control that the paramount general Gao Huan had on the military, Emperor Xiaowu of Northern Wei entered into an alliance with Yuwen Tai and Heba Sheng (Heba Yue's brother), who controlled the southern provinces. When Gao realized this, he marched on the capital Luoyang, and Emperor Xiaowu decided to flee to Yuwen Tai's territory, sending messengers informing Yuwen Tai of his decision. Yuwen Hu was part of the army that Yuwen Tai sent to escort Emperor Xiaowu to Yuwen Tai's headquarters at Chang'an, commanded by general Li Xian (李賢). For his participation in protecting the emperor, Yuwen Hu was created the Count of Shuichi. Later in 534, when Emperor Xiaowu refused to return to Luoyang despite requests by Gao, Gao declared Yuan Shanjian, the son of Emperor Xiaowu's cousin Yuan Dan (元亶), emperor (as Emperor Xiaojing), and moved the capital to Yecheng (鄴城, in modern Handan, Hebei), thus dividing Northern Wei into two—Western Wei, with Emperor Xiaowu as emperor and its capital at Chang'an, and Eastern Wei, with Emperor Xiaojing as emperor.

During the reign of Emperor Xiaowu's cousin and successor Emperor Wen of Western Wei, Yuwen Hu received a number of promotions, and he also had a number of accomplishments on the battlefield. He was made a duke. In 543, though, he was nearly killed in a battle at Luoyang and was only saved from capture or death by his subordinates Hou Fu (侯伏) and Hou Long'en (侯龍恩). Yuwen Tai removed him from his posts but soon returned him to those posts. In 546, he was given the greater title of Duke of Zhongshan. In 554, when Yuwen Tai sent the general Yu Jin to launch a major attack on the Liang dynasty's capital Jiangling, Yuwen Hu served as Yu's lieutenant. The Western Wei army was able to capture Jiangling and put Emperor Yuan of Liang to death, declaring his nephew Emperor Xuan of Western Liang as Liang's emperor instead (albeit controlling only the Jiangling region, known in history as the Western Liang). For this accomplishment, Yuwen Hu's son Yuwen Hui (宇文會) was made the Duke of Jiangling.

In fall 556, while Yuwen Tai was on a tour of the northern provinces, he became ill at Qiantun Mountain (牽屯山, in modern Guyuan, Ningxia). He summoned Yuwen Hu to Qiantun and entrusted the affairs of the state as well as his sons to Yuwen Hu. He soon died, and his heir apparent Yuwen Jue took over his titles, while Yuwen Hu took the reins of the state. (The senior generals and officials, who obeyed Yuwen Tai as effectively the first among equals, were initially reluctant to follow the leadership of the younger Yuwen Hu, only doing so after Yu Jin, previously Yuwen Hu's commanding general, declared his support on the basis that Yuwen Hu was the senior member of the Yuwen clan.) Around the new year 557, believing that Yuwen Jue, who was 14 at this time, needed to have his authority affirmed through an imperial title, Yuwen Hu had Emperor Gong of Western Wei (Emperor Wen's son) yield the throne to Yuwen Jue, ending Western Wei and establishing Northern Zhou.

== During Emperor Xiaomin's reign ==
Yuwen Jue took the throne (as Emperor Xiaomin) but did not use the title "emperor" (皇帝, huáng dì), using instead the Zhou dynasty-style title "Heavenly Prince" (Tian Wang). He created Yuwen Hu the greater title of Duke of Jin.

The political situation, with Yuwen Hu as regent, was unstable. About a month after Emperor Xiaomin took the throne, two of the most senior officials, Zhao Gui the Duke of Chu and Dugu Xin the Duke of Wei, showed signs of displeasure about Yuwen Hu's hold on power. Zhao wanted to kill Yuwen Hu, an action that Dugu tried to persuade him against. Soon thereafter, however, Zhao's plans were revealed by another official, Yuwen Sheng (宇文盛), and Yuwen Hu had Zhao executed and removed Dugu from his office. Soon, he also forced Dugu to commit suicide. When another official, Qi Gui (齊軌), criticized Yuwen Hu's regency, he was also executed.

Meanwhile, Emperor Xiaomin himself, wanting to take power, was engaging in a plot to kill Yuwen Hu. His plot included two of Yuwen Tai's key associates, Li Zhi (李植) and Sun Heng (孫恆), as well as the other officials Yifu Feng (乙弗鳳) and Heba Ti (賀拔提), each of whom was ambitious and therefore further tried to fan Emperor Xiaomin's suspicions against Yuwen Hu. After Li tried to engage another official, Zhang Guangluo (張光洛) in the plot, however, Zhang revealed the plot to Yuwen Hu. Yuwen Hu, not wanting to take drastic actions at first, sent Li and Sun away to be provincial governors. When Emperor Xiaomin wanted to summon Li and Sun back to the capital Chang'an, Yuwen Hu urged against it, pledging his loyalty. However, Yifu and Heba became fearful and plotted to carry out the plot anyway. Zhang again informed Yuwen Hu, who discussed the matter with the generals Helan Xiang (賀蘭祥) and Yuchi Gang (尉遲綱). Helan suggested to him to depose Emperor Xiaomin, and Yuwen Hu had Yuchi arrest Yifu and Heba and disband the imperial guards. Emperor Xiaomin, surprised by the move, barricaded himself in the palace and armed his ladies in waiting and eunuchs. Yuwen Hu sent Helan into the palace to force Emperor Xiaomin to leave the palace and put him under house arrest at his old residence as the Duke of Lüeyang.

Yuwen Hu summoned the high-level officials and informed them of the situation, proposing to depose Emperor Xiaomin and replace him with Emperor Xiaomin's older brother Yuwen Yu the Duke of Ningdu (who was not named heir by Yuwen Tai because his mother Lady Yao was a concubine). The high-level officials, not daring to oppose Yuwen Hu, agreed. Emperor Xiaomin's coconspirators were executed, while he himself was demoted to the rank of Duke of Lüeyang. A month later, Yuwen Hu executed him and forced his wife, Princess Yuan, to become a Buddhist nun. Soon thereafter, Yuwen Yu arrived at Chang'an and took the throne (as Emperor Ming), still using the title of Heavenly Prince.

== During Emperor Ming's reign ==
Emperor Ming continued to honor Yuwen Hu with greater titles and honor, and in 558, he made Yuwen Hu's son Yuwen Zhi (宇文至) the Duke of Chongye.

In the spring of 559, Yuwen Hu formally returned his authority to Emperor Ming, and Emperor Ming began to formally rule on all governmental matters, but Yuwen Hu retained authority over the military. In 559, Emperor Ming began to use the title of emperor.

In the summer of 560, Yuwen Hu, apprehensive of Emperor Ming's intelligence and abilities, instructed the imperial chef Li An (李安) to poison sugar cookies that were submitted to the emperor. Emperor Ming ate them and became ill. Knowing that he was near death, he instructed that, because his sons were young, the throne should be passed to his younger brother Yuwen Yong the Duke of Lu. He died soon thereafter, and Yuwen Yong took the throne as Emperor Wu. Yuwen Hu again took control of both political and military matters.

== During Emperor Wu's reign ==
Emperor Wu did all he could to appear to honor Yuwen Hu in all things, speaking little and not interfering with Yuwen Hu's decisions. During meetings that Emperor Wu's mother Empress Dowager Chinu would have with Yuwen Hu, she would instruct Yuwen Hu to sit at the table with her, while Emperor Wu, as the younger cousin, would stand and attend to them. In 561, Emperor Wu formally bestowed Yuwen Hu, as the Minister of Palace Affairs (大冢宰), authority over the other five ministries as well. In the spring of 561, when general Heruo Dun (賀若敦) was unable to hold the modern Hunan region against attacks by the Chen dynasty general Hou Tian, it was by Yuwen Hu's orders that Heruo was relieved of his posts, despite Heruo's being able to withdraw without further losses. Around the same time, when Emperor Wu posthumously created Yuwen Hu's father Yuwen Hao and uncle Yuwen Luosheng (宇文洛生) Dukes of Shao and Ju, respectively, the inheritance of the titles went to Yuwen Hu's sons Yuwen Hui (宇文會) and Yuwen Zhi.

In spring 563, when Emperor Wu made a sudden night trip back to Chang'an while visiting Yuan Province (原州, roughly modern Guyuan, Gansu), Houmochen Chong the Duke of Liang made an off-the-cuff comment to his staff that it must be that Yuwen Hu died. When Houmochen's comments were reported, Emperor Wu rebuked Houmochen, but Yuwen Hu then followed up by sending soldiers to surround Houmochen's house to force him to commit suicide, although he permitted Houmochen to be buried with honors due a duke. Later that year, to show Yuwen Hu even greater deference, Emperor Wu ordered that in official documents, naming taboo be observed as to Yuwen Hu's name, an honor rarely given to non-emperors.

During the years, Yuwen Hu had tried to send spies to locate his mother Lady Yan and paternal aunt, who were left in the territory of Eastern Wei and its successor state Northern Qi—not knowing that they had been made servants at the subsidiary palace in Zhongshan (中山, in modern Baoding, Hebei). In 564, during peace negotiations with Northern Qi (following a joint Northern Zhou-Tujue attack on Northern Qi earlier that year), Northern Qi released Yuwen Hu's paternal aunt to Northern Zhou, and further promised to release Lady Yan. Emperor Wucheng of Northern Qi had Lady Yan exchange letters with Yuwen Hu, intending to use her to force concessions, but fearful of another Northern Zhou attack if he angered Yuwen Hu, released her without actually securing concessions. However, Yuwen Hu, concerned that Tujue might be displeased if Northern Zhou abandoned the joint operations, nevertheless launched another joint attack with Tujue later in 564, but the armies that he sent to attack Luoyang were defeated by Northern Qi troops and were forced to withdraw. (Historians largely blamed the defeat on Yuwen Hu's half-hearted devotion to the attack and his lack of overall military strategic talent.)

In 565, when Heruo, again made a provincial governor, complained to messengers sent to him by the central government, Yuwen Hu became so displeased that he summoned Heruo back to Chang'an and forced him to kill himself.

In the summer of 567, when the Chen general Hua Jiao (華皎), fearful of adverse intentions of the regent Chen Xu, offered to defect with his Xiang Province (湘州, modern central Hunan), Yuwen Hu, over the opposition by the official Cui You (崔猷), sent an army commanded by Emperor Wu's brother Yuwen Zhi (宇文直) the Duke of Wei to assist Hua and the forces of Northern Zhou's vassal Emperor Ming of Western Liang, who was also aiding Hua. The Chen general Wu Mingche, however, quickly defeated the joint forces of Northern Zhou, Western Liang, and Hua, forcing Hua and Yuwen Zhi to both give up the war and flee to the Western Liang capital Jiangling. Chen was able to retain all of Hua's territory and further make minor territorial gains against both Northern Zhou and Western Liang as well. Yuwen Hu relieved Yuwen Zhi from his posts, and while Yuwen Zhi was eventually restored to them, Yuwen Zhi, who had previously had a cordial relationship with Yuwen Hu, bore a grudge against Yuwen Hu and secretly encouraged Emperor Wu to act against Yuwen Hu.

Around the new year 568, Lady Yan died. By Emperor Wu's orders, Yuwen Hu did not observe the customary three-year mourning period, but continued to serve as regent.

In winter 570, when the Northern Qi general Hulü Guang seized the region north of the Fen River (汾水, flowing through modern Linfen, Shanxi), Yuwen Hu turned to another brother of Emperor Wu, Yuwen Xian the Duke of Qi, for advice, and Yuwen Xian suggested that he himself could lead an army against Hulü, while Yuwen Hu himself should command the main forces but stop at Tong Province (同州, roughly modern Weinan, Shaanxi). Subsequently, Yuwen Xian was able to force Hulü into a stalemate, but substantial territories were still lost to Northern Qi.

By 572, Emperor Wu was conspiring with Yuwen Zhi, as well as his associates Yuwen Shenju (宇文神舉), Wang Gui (王軌), and Yuwen Xiaobo (宇文孝伯), to find a way to kill Yuwen Hu, believing him to be a threat. In the spring of 572, after Emperor Wu and Yuwen Hu had a meeting, he invited Yuwen Hu into the palace to meet with Empress Dowager Chinu. On the way to her palace, he told Yuwen Hu that Empress Dowager Chinu was having a problem with alcoholism and not listening to his advice to stop her drinking, so he wanted Yuwen Hu to advise her to change her ways as well. He further gave Yuwen Hu the text of the Jiu Gao (酒誥) -- an anti-alcoholism declaration written by King Cheng of Zhou—and suggested that he read the Jiu Gao to Empress Dowager Chinu. Once they reached her palace, Yuwen Hu, pursuant to Emperor Wu's request, started reading the Jiu Gao. Before he could finish it, Emperor Wu stepped behind him and used a jade tablet to strike the back of his head. Yuwen Hu fell to the ground, and Yuwen Zhi, who was hiding nearby, jumped out, and cut off Yuwen Hu's head, ending Yuwen Hu's hold on power. Yuwen Hu's sons and key associates were all executed. In 574, Yuwen Hu was posthumously restored to the title of Duke, reburied with honors due a duke, and awarded with a posthumous name (albeit the very unflattering one of Dang (蕩, meaning "improper")).

== In media ==
- Portrayed by Zheng Xiaoning in the 2013 TV series Prince of Lan Ling.
- Portrayed by Lin Wei Chen in the 2016 TV series Princess of Lanling King.
- Portrayed by Jeremy Tsui in the 2018 TV series The Legend of Dugu.
- Portrayed by Jiang Kai in the 2018 TV series Queen Dugu.
