= Empress Yifu =

Empress Yifu (乙弗皇后, personal name unknown) (510–540 CE), formally Empress Wen (文皇后, literally "the civil empress"), was an empress of the Xianbei-led Chinese Western Wei dynasty—a branch successor state of Northern Wei. Her husband was Emperor Wen (Yuan Baoju).

== Background ==
Her ancestors were ancestral chiefs of a branch tribe of Tuyuhun, and later became vassals of Northern Wei. After Northern Wei conquered Northern Liang in 439, her great-great-grandfather Yifu Mogui (乙弗莫瓌) led his tribe into Northern Wei and became a Northern Wei general. For three generations following his, the Yifus married Northern Wei princesses, and their daughters often married Northern Wei imperial princes. Her father Yifu Yuan (乙弗瑗) was a provincial governor, and her mother was the Princess Huaiyang, a daughter of Emperor Xiaowen.

In 525, when she was 15, she married Yuan Baoju, who was then 18 and a general under his cousin Emperor Xiaoming, but who carried no noble title because his father Yuan Yu (元愉) the Prince of Jingzhao had had his title stripped posthumously in a rebellion. In 535, after Northern Wei had split into Eastern Wei and Western Wei, he was made emperor (as Emperor Wen) by the general Yuwen Tai after the death of his cousin Emperor Xiaowu. He created her empress and created her son Yuan Qin crown prince.

== As empress ==
As empress, Empress Yifu was said to be frugal, avoiding extravagant clothing, jewelry, and food, often eating just vegetables. She was also said to be kind and tolerant and never jealous, and Emperor Wen respected her greatly. They had 12 children, although only Yuan Qin and Yuan Wu (元戊) the Prince of Wudu survived infancy.

In 538, with Western Wei occupied with wars against Eastern Wei and unable to defend itself against attacks by Rouran, Yuwen Tai wanted to further relationships with Rouran through an imperial marriage. He first had Emperor Wen create the daughter of the official Yuan Yi (元翌) as the Princess Huazheng and marry her to the Rouran Chiliantoubingdoufa Khan Yujiulü Anagui's brother Yujiulü Tahan (郁久閭塔寒), and then further asked Emperor Wen to marry Yujiulü Anagui's daughter. Emperor Wen was forced to agree. He deposed Empress Yifu and made her become a Buddhist nun, and he created Yujiulü Anagui's daughter empress.

== Death ==
Even though Empress Yifu had been deposed and made a nun, however, Empress Yujiulü was still jealous of her. To avoid conflict, in 540, Emperor Wen made Yuan Wu the governor of Qin Province (秦州, roughly modern Tianshui, Gansu), and had Empress Yifu accompany Yuan Wu to his post. Emperor Wen, still harboring love for her in his heart, secretly requested that she start keeping her hair uncut so that he could eventually welcome her back to the palace. Unfortunately, around the same time, Rouran launched a major attack against Western Wei, and a number of officials believed that the Rouran attack was made on behalf of Empress Yujiulü. Emperor Wen, with the officials pressuring him, sent his eunuch Cao Chong (曹寵) to Qin Province to order Empress Yifu to commit suicide. She made the comment to Cao:

May it be that His Imperial majesty live for a thousand years, and the empire is happy and calm. I do not have regrets about death.

She then committed suicide, and was buried with honors due an empress, albeit not near the capital Chang'an, but instead at the Maiji Cliffs (麥積崖), near Shanggui (上邽) the capital of Qin Province. It was not until later, when Yuan Qin was emperor, that she was reburied with Emperor Wen.

Chinese royalty
| Preceded by Empress Gao | Empress of Northern Wei (Western); 535–538 | Succeeded by Empress Yujiulü |
