= Emperor Ming of Northern Zhou =

Emperor Ming of Northern Zhou 北周明帝
- Emperor of Zhou

Emperor of Northern Zhou
- Reign: 5 November 557 – 30 May 560
- Predecessor: Emperor Xiaomin
- Successor: Emperor Wu
- Regent: Yuwen Hu
- Born: 534
- Died: May 30, 560
- Burial: Zhao Mausoleum (昭陵)
Full name
- Family name: Yǔwén (宇文); Given name: Yù (毓)
Era dates
- None: 557-559; Wǔchéng (武成): 559-560
Posthumous name
- Emperor Xiàomíng (孝明皇帝, "filial and understanding")
Temple name
- Shizong (世宗)
- House: Yuwen
- Dynasty: Northern Zhou
- Father: Yuwen Tai
- Mother: Lady Yao

Emperor Ming of Northern Zhou ((北)周明帝) (534 – 30 May 560), personal name Yuwen Yu (宇文毓), Xianbei name Tongwantu (統萬突), was the second emperor of the Xianbei-led Chinese Northern Zhou dynasty, although at the start of his reign he used the alternative title "Heavenly Prince" (Tian Wang). He was made emperor after his younger brother Emperor Xiaomin was deposed and killed by the regent Yuwen Hu. Emperor Ming himself assumed some, but not all, powers from Yuwen Hu, and was generally considered able. Because of this, Yuwen Hu became apprehensive, and in 560, he poisoned Emperor Ming to death. While near death, however, Emperor Ming appointed his brother Yuwen Yong (Emperor Wu) as his successor, believing Yuwen Yong to be intelligent and capable, and in 572, Yuwen Yong was finally able to kill Yuwen Hu and assume full imperial powers.

== Background ==
Yuwen Yu was born in 534, as the oldest son of the then-Northern Wei general Yuwen Tai. His mother was Yuwen Tai's concubine Lady Yao. His nickname of Tongwantu was derived from the fact that Lady Yao gave birth to him at the important city of Tongwan (統萬, in modern Yulin, Shaanxi) while accompanying Yuwen Tai on an inspection of the city. Also in 534, Northern Wei divided into two rival states, Western Wei and Eastern Wei, with Yuwen Tai as the paramount general of Western Wei. In 548, Emperor Wen of Western Wei, to further honor Yuwen Tai, created Yuwen Yu the Duke of Ningdu. In 550, he was made a provincial governor, and for the next several years, he was rotated between several provinces. During his term as a provincial governor, he married the daughter of the key general Dugu Xin as his wife.

In spring 556, Yuwen Tai was pondering the issue of succession. His wife Princess Fengyi, the sister of Emperor Xiaowu of Northern Wei, had one son, Yuwen Jue, but he considered the fact of whether making Yuwen Jue heir apparent over Yuwen Yu would trouble Dugu Xin. On the advice of Li Yuan (李遠), who argued that the son of a wife always had precedence over the son of a concubine, Yuwen Tai made Yuwen Jue his heir apparent. Yuwen Tai died later that year, and Yuwen Jue inherited his titles, under the guardianship of Yuwen Tai's nephew Yuwen Hu. In early 557, Yuwen Hu forced Emperor Gong of Western Wei to yield the throne to Yuwen Jue, ending Western Wei and establishing Northern Zhou (with Yuwen Jue as its Emperor Xiaomin but using the alternative title of "Heavenly Prince" (Tian Wang)).

Later in 557, the 15-year-old Emperor Xiaomin, wanting to exercise full imperial powers, plotted to have Yuwen Hu killed. When Yuwen Hu discovered the plot, he deposed and then killed Emperor Xiaomin. Yuwen Hu welcomed Yuwen Yu to the capital Chang'an to take over the throne, still with the Heavenly Prince title.

== Reign ==
In spring 558, Emperor Ming created his wife Duchess Dugu the title of princess (as he was still using the Heavenly Prince title at this point). Three months later, however, she died. (The historian Bo Yang speculated that because Yuwen Hu had in 557 forced her father Dugu Xin to commit suicide after Dugu Xin was implicated in a plot to overthrow Yuwen Hu, that Yuwen Hu had her murdered, but had no concrete evidence to show that that happened.)

In spring 559, Yuwen Hu formally returned his authorities to Emperor Ming, and Emperor Ming began to formally rule on all governmental matters, but Yuwen Hu retained authority over the military. Emperor Ming was generally credited with making sensible decisions and being humble toward elders, honoring them appropriately and listening to their advice.

In fall 559, Emperor Ming formally began to use the title of emperor and started using an era name (Wucheng); the practice had been abolished earlier by Yuwen Tai, during the time of Western Wei's Emperor Fei.

In spring 560, with Xiao Zhuang—a rival claimant to the Liang dynasty throne to Western Liang's Emperor Xuan of Western Liang, who was a Northern Zhou vassal and whom Northern Zhou supported—attacking Chen dynasty territory with his paramount general Wang Lin, Northern Zhou sent its general Shi Ning (史寧) to attack Xiao Zhuang's capital Jiangxia (江夏, in modern Wuhan, Hubei). Soon, however, after Xiao Zhuang and Wang were defeated by the Chen general Hou Tian and forced to flee to Northern Qi and Chen forces subsequently approaching Jiangxia, Northern Zhou abandoned the campaign on Jiangxia, but were able to seize part of Xiao Zhuang's former territory—modern Hunan, which Northern Zhou turned over to Western Liang but sent forces to help defend. In spring 560, Chen made peace overtures to Northern Zhou, which Northern Zhou accepted.

in summer 560, Yuwen Hu, apprehensive of Emperor Ming's intelligence and abilities, instructed the imperial chef Li An (李安) to poison sugar cookies that were submitted to the emperor. Emperor Ming ate them and became ill. Knowing that he was near death, he instructed that, because his sons were young, the throne should be passed to his younger brother Yuwen Yong the Duke of Lu. He died soon thereafter, and Yuwen Yong took the throne as Emperor Wu.

== Family ==
Consorts and Issue:

- Empress Mingjing, of the Dugu clan of Henan (明敬皇后 河南獨孤氏; d. 558)
  - Crown Prince (皇太子, b.558)
- Fei, of the Xu clan (妃 徐氏)
  - Yuwen Xian, Prince La of Bi (畢剌王 宇文賢; 559–580), 1st son
- Unknown
  - Yuwen Zhen, Prince Feng (酆王 宇文貞; d. 581), 2nd son
  - Yuwen Shi, Prince Song (宋王 宇文實; d. 581), 3rd son
  - Princess Henan (河南公主)
    - Married Yuchi Jing (尉遲敬)
  - A daughter who married Helan Shi (賀蘭師)

Regnal titles
| Preceded by Emperor Xiaomin of Northern Zhou | Emperor of Northern Zhou; 557–560 | Succeeded by Emperor Wu of Northern Zhou |
