= Prince Hui =

Prince Hui may refer to either of the following Qing dynasty princely peerages:

- Prince Hui (second rank) (惠郡王), created in 1665
- Prince Hui (first rank) (惠親王), created in 1839
