= Duke Wen =

Duke Wen may refer to these rulers from ancient China:

- Duke of Zhou (fl. 11th century BC)
- Duke Wen of Qi (died 804 BC)
- Duke Wen of Chen (died 745 BC)
- Duke Wen of Qin (died 716 BC)
- Duke Wen of Jin (697–628 BC)
- Duke Wen of Eastern Zhou (died 249 BC)

== See also ==
- Marquess Wen (disambiguation)
