= King Hui =

King Hui may refer to:

- King Hui of Zhou (reigned 677–652 BC), king of the Zhou Dynasty
- King Hui of Chu (reigned 488–432 BC), king of Chu
- King Hui of Wei (reigned 370–319 BC), king of Wei
- Hui of Balhae (reigned 812–817 AD), king of Balhae
