= Empress Yujiulü =

- Born: 525
- Died: 540 (aged 14–15)
- Spouse: Emperor Wen of Western Wei
- Issue: Unnamed child
Regnal name
- Empress Dao 悼皇后
- Father: Yujiulü Anagui

Empress Yujiulü (郁久閭皇后, personal name unknown) (525–540), formally Empress Dao (悼皇后, literally "the untimely-dead empress"), was an empress of the Xianbei-led Chinese Western Wei dynasty — a branch successor state of Northern Wei. Her husband was Emperor Wen.

She was a daughter of the Chiliantoubingdoufa Khan of Rouran, Yujiulü Anagui (郁久閭阿那瓌). In 538, with Western Wei fighting constant wars with Eastern Wei and suffering from Rouran invasions, Yuwen Tai, the paramount general of Western Wei, requested Emperor Wen to depose his wife Empress Yifu and marry a daughter of Rouran's khan. Emperor Wen was forced to agree, and he sent Yuan Fu (元孚) the Prince of Fufeng to Rouran to invite her to be his empress. Yujiulü Anagui gave Western Wei 700 carts full of goods as dowry, along with 10,000 horses and 2,000 camels. As her train encountered that of Yuan Fu's, Yuan Fu requested that she turn her face from facing east (the honored direction pursuant to Rouran customs) to south (the honored direction pursuant to Chinese customs). She made the response:

I have not yet met the emperor of Wei, and I am still a daughter of Rouran. Let the welcome train of Wei be to my south, but I will still face east.

When she arrived at Chang'an in spring 538, Emperor Wen created her empress. In spring 540, she was pregnant when Rouran launched a major attack on Western Wei — causing the Western Wei officials to believe that the attack was launched because she was jealous of the former Empress Yifu, who was by then a Buddhist nun. Emperor Wen, under pressure, ordered Empress Yifu to commit suicide. Later in the year, when Empress Yujiulü herself was about to give birth, she heard unusual barking noises in the palace, and she suspected them as from the spirit of Empress Yifu. She therefore grew depressed, and she died either during or shortly after childbirth. When Emperor Wen subsequently died in 551, he was buried with her, although eventually Empress Yifu was buried with him.

Chinese royalty
Preceded by Empress Yifu	Empress of Northern Wei (Western); 538–540	Succeeded by Empress Yuwen
