= Emperor Hui =

Emperor Hui may refer to:

- Emperor Hui of Han (210 BC–188 BC)
- Emperor Hui of Jin (259–307)
- Emperor Hui of Ming (Jianwen Emperor, 1377-1402)

It is also Chinese rendering for the titles of the rulers of Vietnam:

- Lê Kính Tông (1588-1619)
- Dục Đức (1852-1883)

== See also ==
- Huizong (disambiguation)
