= Emperor Fei of Western Wei =

Yuan Qin 元欽

Emperor of Western Wei
- Reign: March 28, 551 – c.March 554
- Predecessor: Emperor Wen
- Successor: Emperor Gong
- Regent: Yuwen Tai
- Born: unknown
- Died: May or June 554
- Spouse: Empress Yuwen
Full name
- Family name: Yuán (元); Given name: Qīn (欽)
Era dates
- None
Posthumous name
- None
Temple name
- None
- House: Yuan
- Dynasty: Western Wei

Yuan Qin (Chinese: 元欽), known in historiography as Emperor Fei of Western Wei ((西)魏廢帝; lit. "deposed") (died May or June 554), was an emperor of China's Xianbei-led Western Wei dynasty. He, even more so than his father Emperor Wen, held little actual power in the face of overwhelming control of power by his father-in-law paramount general Yuwen Tai. In 554, he tried to plot to have Yuwen killed, but his plot was discovered, and Yuwen deposed him, and soon had him killed. Yuan Qin also holds the distinction of being 1 of 2 known Chinese Emperors that did not have any concubines, along with Hongzhi Emperor.

== As crown prince ==
It is not known when Yuan Qin was born. What is known is that he was the oldest son of Yuan Baoju the Prince of Nanyang, a grandson of Emperor Xiaowen of Northern Wei, by his wife Princess Yifu, and that he had one younger brother by Princess Yifu, Yuan Wu (元戊). Around the new year 535, Emperor Xiaowu of Northern Wei—a cousin of Yuan Baoju and the final emperor of the undivided Northern Wei state but who by now was only emperor over the western part of the state (i.e., Western Wei) -- was poisoned by the paramount general Yuwen Tai over a dispute developed when Yuwen disapproved of his incestuous relationship with Yuan Baoju's sister Yuan Mingyue (元明月). Yuwen Tai made Yuan Baoju the new emperor (as Emperor Wen). Emperor Wen created Princess Yifu empress, and created Yuan Qin crown prince on 25 February 535. In 538, while both Emperor Wen and Yuwen Tai were away on a campaign against Eastern Wei, Yuan Qin was nominally put in charge of the capital Chang'an, although the official Zhou Huida (周惠達) was actually in charge. When former Eastern Wei captives, upon hearing initial news of Eastern Wei victories, rebelled within Chang'an with Zhao Qingque (趙青雀), Zhou and Li Hu (李虎) were forced to escort the crown prince out of Chang'an to flee the rebellion. Eventually, when Yuwen returned, Zhao's rebellion collapsed, and Emperor Wen and Yuan Qin were both able to return to Chang'an.

According to Book of Zhou when Yuan Qin was 7, his father, Emperor Wen had him sent to Yuwen Tai to be fostered. It is not known for how long he was fostered.

Emperor Wen had little actual power, and also in 538, over Yuwen's desire for an alliance with Rouran, he was forced to depose Empress Yifu and marry the daughter of Rouran's Chiliantoubingdoufa Khan Yujiulü Anagui as his empress. In 540, he was further forced to initially send Empress Yujiulü away from Chang'an (to live with Yuan Qin's younger brother Yuan Wu), and then forced to order her to commit suicide.

Sometime during Emperor Wen's reign, Yuan Qin married Yuwen Tai's daughter as his crown princess. It was recorded that he respected her greatly, and that he had no concubines and only had her as a partner throughout his life.

In 542, during an assault that Eastern Wei's paramount general Gao Huan launched on the border city Yubi (玉壁, in modern Yuncheng, Shanxi), Yuan Qin was made the defender of the important city Puban (蒲坂, in modern Yuncheng as well), while Yuwen launched an army to try to catch up with Gao as he retreated. It is not known how much responsibility or authority Yuan Qin actually had during this campaign, as the very oldest he would be only 17.

In 551, after Emperor Wen died, Yuan Qin took the throne as Emperor Fei.

== As emperor ==
Emperor Fei appeared to have even less actual power than his father, to whom Yuwen Tai paid formal deference. He was able to rebury his mother Empress Yifu with his father Emperor Wen. He created his wife, Crown Princess Yuwen, empress. Apparently because Yuwen wanted to restore many Zhou dynasty customs and traditions, Emperor Fei did not use an era name; rather, the years of his reign were merely referred to as "the first year," "the second year," and so on.

In 553, Yuwen Tai's nephew Yuchi Jiong conquered the western provinces of Liang dynasty, which had been previously under the control of the Liang pretender to the throne, Xiao Ji, and added them to Western Wei territory.

In late 553, the official Yuan Lie (元烈) plotted killing Yuwen, but his plot was discovered, and Yuwen killed him. After Yuan Lie's death, Emperor Fei became angry at Yuwen and often spoke against him. He also secretly plotted killing Yuwen, despite advice from Yuan Yu (元育) the Prince of Linhuai and Yuan Zan (元贊, the nephew of Emperor Xiaowu) the Prince of Guangping that plotting was dangerous. Emperor Fei's plot, however, was eventually discovered by Yuwen's other sons-in-law. Yuwen deposed and imprisoned Emperor Fei, making his younger half-brother Yuan Kuo emperor (as Emperor Gong). Soon thereafter, Emperor Fei was put to death. According to the History of Northern Dynasties, his wife Empress Yuwen "also suffered death because she was faithful to Wei's imperial house," although it is unclear exactly how she died or whether she died the same year he did.

== Personal information ==
- Father: Emperor Wen of Western Wei
- Mother: Empress Yifu
- Wife: Empress Yuwen (created 551?, d. 554?)
  - Eldest son (born 548)

== Sources ==
- History of Northern Dynasties, vol. 5.
- Zizhi Tongjian, vols. 157, 158, 164, 165.
- Book of Zhou vol. 2

Regnal titles
Preceded by Emperor Wen of Western Wei	Emperor of Northern Wei (Western); 551–554	Succeeded by Emperor Gong of Western Wei
Preceded by Emperor Wen of Western Wei	Emperor of China (Western); 551–554	Succeeded by Emperor Gong of Western Wei
Preceded by Xiao Ji of Liang	Emperor of China (Southwestern); 553–554	Succeeded by Emperor Gong of Western Wei
