= Emperor Xiaomin of Northern Zhou =

Emperor Xiaomin of Northern Zhou 北周孝閔帝
- Heavenly King of Zhou

Ruler of Northern Zhou
- Reign: February 15, 557 – late October 557
- Successor: Emperor Ming
- Regent: Yuwen Hu
- Born: 542
- Died: 557(aged 15)
- Burial: Jing Mausoleum (靜陵)
- Consorts: Empress Xiaomin
- Issue: Yuwen Kang
Full name
- Family name: Yǔwén (宇文); Given name: Jué (覺)
Era dates
- None
Posthumous name
- Emperor Xiàomǐn (孝閔皇帝, "filial and careful")
- House: Yuwen
- Dynasty: Northern Zhou
- Father: Yuwen Tai
- Mother: Lady Yuan of Henan

Emperor Xiaomin of Northern Zhou ((北)周孝閔帝) (542 – c. early November 557), personal name Yuwen Jue (宇文覺), nickname Dharani (陀羅尼), was the founding emperor of the Xianbei-led Northern Zhou dynasty of China, ruling as Heavenly Prince (Tian Wang). He was the heir of Western Wei's paramount general Yuwen Tai, and after Yuwen Tai's death in 556, his cousin Yuwen Hu, serving as his guardian, forced Emperor Gong of Western Wei to yield the throne to Yuwen Jue in spring 557, establishing Northern Zhou. Later in 557, however, Yuwen Jue, wanting to assume power personally, plotted to kill Yuwen Hu, who in turn deposed him and replaced him with his brother Yuwen Yu (Emperor Ming). Later that year, Yuwen Hu had Yuwen Jue executed.

== Background ==
Yuwen Jue was born in 542 as the son of Yuwen Tai, then the paramount general of Western Wei, and Yuwen Tai's wife Princess Pingyi, the sister of Emperor Xiaowu of Northern Wei. He was Yuwen Tai's third son, but was largely viewed as Yuwen Tai's likely heir because his mother was both of royal birth and Yuwen Tai's wife, while his older brothers Yuwen Yu and Yuwen Zhen (宇文震) were sons of concubines. In 550, he became the Duke of Lüeyang. He later married Emperor Wen's daughter Yuan Humo the Princess Jin'an as his wife and duchess.

In spring 556, Yuwen Tai was pondering the issue of succession. Yuwen Jue was born of the Princess Pingyi, but Yuwen Yu was older and married to the daughter of one of his chief generals, Dugu Xin. On the advice of Li Yuan (李遠), who argued that the son of a wife always had precedence over the son of a concubine, Yuwen Tai made Yuwen Jue his heir apparent.

in fall 556, while Yuwen Tai was on a tour of the northern provinces, he became ill at Qiantun Mountain (牽屯山, in modern Guyuan, Ningxia). He summoned his nephew Yuwen Hu the Duke of Zhongshan to Qiantun and entrusted the affairs of the state as well as his sons to Yuwen Hu. He soon died, and Yuwen Jue took over his titles (among them, Duke of Anding), while Yuwen Hu took the reins of the state. Yuwen Jue set up his headquarters at Tong Province (同州, roughly modern Weinan, Shaanxi), where Yuwen Tai's headquarters had been.

On 1 February 557, Yuwen Jue gained the greater title of Duke of Zhou.

In spring 557, Yuwen Hu, believing that Yuwen Jue's youth meant that he needed to take imperial title to affirm his authority, forced Emperor Gong to yield the throne to Yuwen Jue (as Emperor Xiaomin), ending Western Wei and starting Northern Zhou.

== Reign and death ==
Emperor Xiaomin took the throne, but did not use the title "emperor" (皇帝, huáng dì), but used the Zhou dynasty-style title "Heavenly Prince" (Tian Wang). He posthumously honored Yuwen Tai as Prince Wen and the Princess Pingyi as Princess Wen. He created the former Emperor Gong the Duke of Song, but soon thereafter, the duke was executed. The governmental structure and ceremonies were largely imitative of Zhou dynasty, but also incorporated many Xianbei elements, largely abandoning Han customs originated in the post-Zhou centuries. He created his wife, Duchess Yuan, princess.

With Yuwen Hu as regent, The political situation was unstable. About a month after Emperor Xiaomin took the throne, two of the most senior officials, Zhao Gui the Duke of Chu and Dugu Xin the Duke of Wei, showed displeasure about Yuwen Hu's hold on power. Zhao wanted to kill Yuwen Hu, an action that Dugu tried to persuade him against. Soon thereafter, however, Zhao's plans were revealed by another official, Yuwen Sheng (宇文盛), and Yuwen Hu had Zhao executed and removed Dugu from his office. Soon, he also forced Dugu to commit suicide. When another official, Qi Gui (齊軌), criticized Yuwen Hu's regency, he was also executed.

Meanwhile, Emperor Xiaomin himself, wanting to take power, was engaging in a plot to kill Yuwen Hu. His plot included two of Yuwen Tai's key associates, Li Zhi (李植) and Sun Heng (孫恆), as well as the other officials Yifu Feng (乙弗鳳) and Heba Ti (賀拔提), each of whom was ambitious and therefore further tried to fan Emperor Xiaomin's suspicions against Yuwen Hu. After Li tried to engage another official, Zhang Guangluo (張光洛) in the plot, however, Zhang revealed the plot to Yuwen Hu. Yuwen Hu, not wanting to take drastic actions at first, sent Li and Sun away to be provincial governors. When Emperor Xiaomin wanted to summon Li and Sun back to the capital Chang'an, Yuwen Hu urged against it, pledging his loyalty. However, Yifu and Heba became fearful and plotted to carry out the plot anyway. Zhang again informed Yuwen Hu, who discussed the matter with the generals Helan Xiang (賀蘭祥) and Yuchi Gang (尉遲綱). Helan suggested to him to depose Emperor Xiaomin, and Yuwen Hu had Yuchi arrest Yifu and Heba and disband the imperial guards. Emperor Xiaomin, surprised by the move, barricaded himself in the palace and armed his ladies in waiting and eunuchs. Yuwen Hu sent Helan into the palace to force Emperor Xiaomin to leave the palace and put him under house arrest at his old residence as the Duke of Lüeyang.

Yuwen Hu summoned the high-level officials and informed them the situation, proposing to depose Emperor Xiaomin and replace him with Yuwen Yu. The high-level officials, not daring to oppose Yuwen Hu, agreed. Emperor Xiaomin's coconspirators were executed, while he himself was demoted to the rank of Duke of Lüeyang. A month later, Yuwen Hu executed him and forced his wife, Princess Yuan, to become a Buddhist nun. After another brother of Emperor Xiaomin, Emperor Wu killed Yuwen Hu in 572, he posthumously honored Emperor Xiaomin as emperor and reburied him with honors due one.

== Family ==
Consorts and Issue:

- Empress Xiaomin, of the Yuan clan of Henan (孝闵皇后 河南元氏; d. 616), second cousin, personal name Humo (胡摩)
- Furen, of the Lu clan (夫人 陸氏)
  - Yuwen Kang, Prince Li of Ji (紀厲王 宇文康; d. 576), first son

== Tomb ==
He was buried in Xianyang City, China.

Chinese royalty
New dynasty	Emperor of Northern Zhou; 557	Succeeded by Emperor Ming of Northern Zhou
Preceded by Emperor Gong of Western Wei	Emperor of China (Western); 557	Succeeded by Emperor Ming of Northern Zhou
