= Emperor Gong of Western Wei =

Emperor Gong of Western Wei 西魏恭帝

Emperor of Western Wei
- Reign: c.March 554 – 14 February 557
- Predecessor: Emperor Fei
- Regent: Yuwen Tai (554–556); Yuwen Jue & Yuwen Hu (556–557)
- Born: 537?
- Died: 557 (aged 19–20)
Names
- Family name: Initially Yuán (元), later changed to Tuòbá (拓跋) in 554; Given name:Kuò (廓)
Era dates
- None
Posthumous name
- Emperor Gong (恭皇帝; lit. "respectful")
Temple name
- None
- House: Tuoba (Yuan)
- Dynasty: Western Wei

Emperor Gong of Western Wei ((西)魏恭帝) (537? – April 557), personal name né Yuan Kuo (元廓), later changed to Tuoba Kuo (拓跋廓), was the last emperor of the Western Wei dynasty of China. He was made emperor in c.March 554 after his older half-brother Yuan Qin was deposed by the paramount general Yuwen Tai. He carried little actual power, and in 556, after Yuwen Tai's death, Yuwen Tai's nephew Yuwen Hu, serving as guardian to Yuwen Tai's son Yuwen Jue (Emperor Xiaomin of Northern Zhou), forced Emperor Gong to yield the throne to Yuwen Jue, ending Western Wei and founding the Northern Zhou dynasty. The former emperor was killed in 557.

== Background ==
Yuan Kuo was born in 537, as the fourth son of Emperor Wen. His mother's name is not recorded in history. In 548, Emperor Wen created him the Prince of Qi. He subsequently served under Dugu Xin as one of Western Wei's twelve great generals. However, nothing else is known about his activities during his father's reign, during which the paramount general Yuwen Tai largely controlled power. Yuwen's hold on power appeared to be even firmer after Emperor Wen died in 551 and was succeeded by Yuan Kuo's older brother Yuan Qin (as Emperor Fei). During Yuan Kuo's stint as the Prince of Qi, he married the daughter of the general Ruogan Hui (若干惠) as his wife and princess.

In 554, Emperor Fei, angry over Yuwen Tai's execution of the official Yuan Lie (元烈) in 553, plotted to have Yuwen killed. However, the news was leaked, and Yuwen deposed him. He selected Yuan Kuo to succeed Emperor Fei (as Emperor Gong). Contemporaneously, Yuwen changed the imperial clan's surname from Yuan back to Tuoba, reversing the change that Emperor Xiaowen ordered in 496.

== Reign ==
Emperor Gong appeared to be even more powerless than his father and brother, and the power remained in Yuwen's hands. He created his wife, Princess Ruogan, empress. Later in 554, Yuwen poisoned the deposed Emperor Fei to death. Later that year, an army dispatched by Yuwen and commanded by Yu Jin captured rival Liang dynasty's capital Jiangling (江陵, in modern Jingzhou, Hubei), capturing and executing Liang's Emperor Yuan. In spring 555, Emperor Gong created Xiao Cha, a nephew of Emperor Yuan, the Emperor of Liang (as Emperor Xuan), but Xiao Cha was not recognized by most of Liang generals and officials, who instead recognized Xiao Yuanming, a candidate supported by Northern Qi, as emperor. (Xiao Cha's state is known as the Western Liang in history.)

Later in 555, Yuwen required Tuoba Yu (拓跋育) the Prince of Huai'an to submit to Emperor Gong a proposal to have the imperial princes reduced in rank to dukes, of which Emperor Gong approved. In spring 556, pursuant to Yuwen's desire to reorganize the governmental structure in accordance with the Zhou dynasty governmental structure, the imperial government was reorganized into six departments.

In fall 556, while Yuwen Tai was on a tour of the northern provinces, he became ill at Qiantun Mountain (牽屯山, in modern Guyuan, Ningxia). He summoned his nephew Yuwen Hu to Qiantun and entrusted the affairs of the state as well as his sons to Yuwen Hu. He soon died, and Yuwen Tai's 14-year-old son Yuwen Jue took over his titles, while Yuwen Hu took the reins of the state. Emperor Gong was subsequently forced to create Yuwen Jue the greater title of Duke of Zhou.

In spring 557, Yuwen Hu, believing that Yuwen Jue's youth meant that he needed to take the imperial title to affirm his authority, forced Emperor Gong to yield the throne to Yuwen Jue, ending Western Wei and starting Northern Zhou.

== Death ==
Yuwen Jue (Emperor Xiaomin) initially created Tuoba Kuo the Duke of Song. However, less than two months after Tuoba Kuo yielded the throne, he was killed. His wife, the former Empress Ruogan, became a Buddhist nun.

== Personal information ==
- Father
  - Emperor Wen of Western Wei
- Wife
  - Empress Ruogan (created 554)
- Children
  - Tuoba Chu (555 - killed 557), eldest son, presumably killed along with him

Chinese royalty
Preceded by Emperor Fei of Western Wei	Emperor of Northern Wei (Western); 554–556	Dynasty ended
Preceded by Emperor Fei of Western Wei	Emperor of China (Western); 554–556	Succeeded by Emperor Xiaomin of Northern Zhou
