= Yuwen Tai =

Posthumous Emperor of Northern Zhou (died 556)

- (Posthumous) Emperor of Northern Zhou
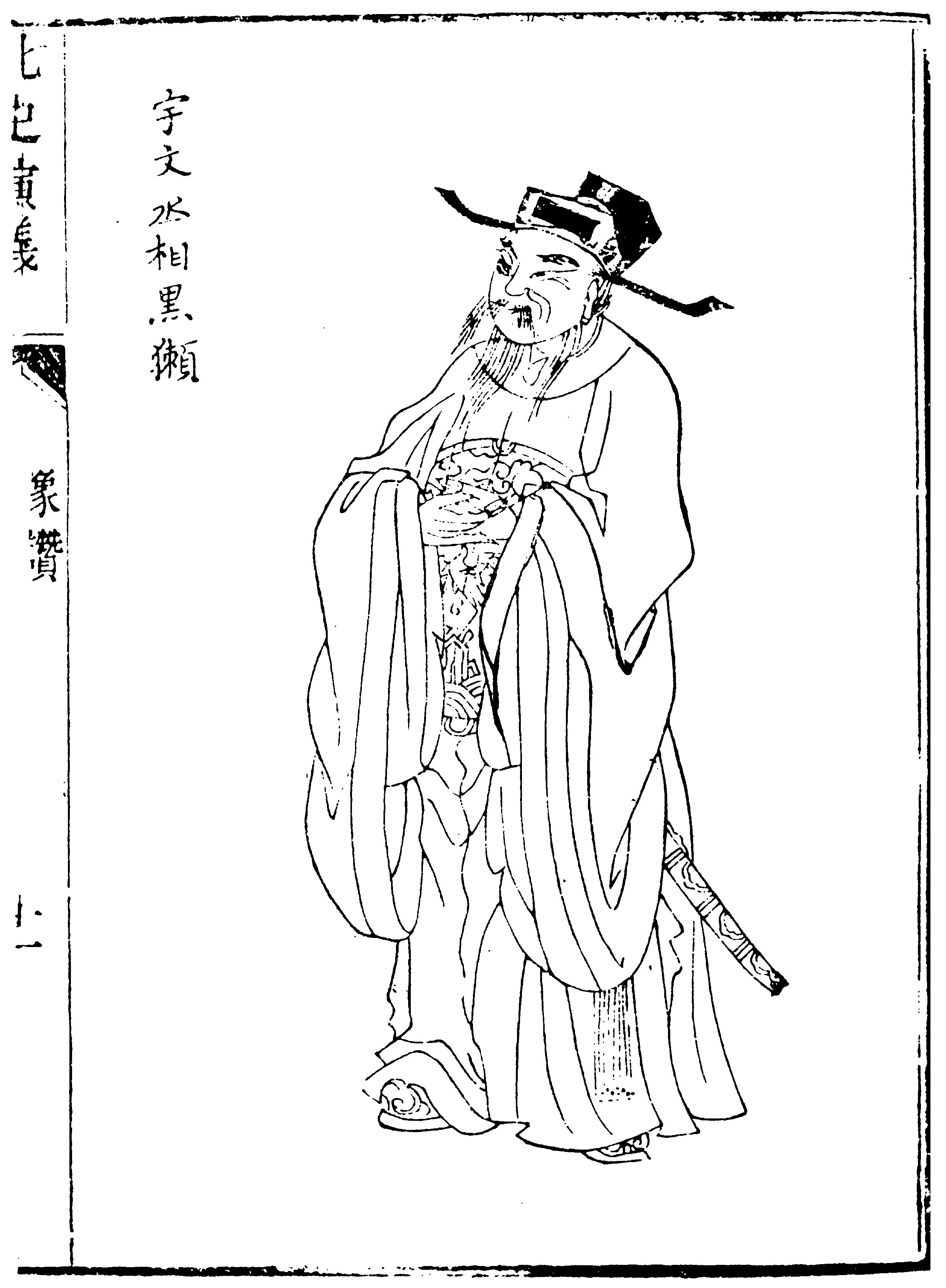

Regent of Western Wei
- Reign: 18 February 535 – 21 November 556
- Successor: Yuwen Jue
- Monarch: Emperor Wen; Emperor Fei; Emperor Gong
- Born: 505
- Died: 556 (aged 50–51)
- Consorts: Lady Yuan of Henan; Empress Xuan
- Issue: Emperor Ming; Yuwen Zhen; Emperor Xiaomin; Emperor Wu; Yuwen Xian; Yuwen Zhi; Yuwen Zhao; Yuwen Jian; Yuwen Chun; Yuwen Sheng; Yuwen Da; Yuwen Tong; Yuwen You; Lady Yuwen; Princess Xiangyang; Princess Yi'an; Princess Shunyang; Princess Pingyuan; Princess Yongfu; Princess Xihe; Princess Yigui; Princess Yidu; Princess Deguang
Posthumous name
- Emperor Wen 文皇帝
Temple name
- Taizu 太祖
- Dynasty: Northern Zhou
- Father: Yuwen Gong
- Mother: Lady Wang of Lelang

Yuwen Tai (Chinese: 宇文泰; pinyin: Yǔwén Tài) (505/7 – 21 November 556 (Note: According to Yuwen Tai's biography in Book of Zhou, he died aged 52 (by East Asian reckoning) on the yihai day of the 10th month of the 3rd year of the reign of Emperor Gong of Western Wei. This corresponds to 21 Nov 556 in the Julian calendar. Thus by calculation, his birth year should be 505. However, his biography in History of the Northern Dynasties recorded that he was 50 (by East Asian reckoning) when he died. If this account is correct, his birth year would be 507. Note that both Zhou Shu and Bei Shi gave the same date of death.)), nickname Heita (黑獺), formally Duke Wen of Anding (安定文公), later further posthumously honored by Northern Zhou initially as Prince Wen (文王) then as Emperor Wen (文皇帝) with the temple name Taizu (太祖), was the de facto ruler and paramount general of the Xianbei-led Chinese Western Wei dynasty, a branch successor state of the Northern Wei. In 534, Emperor Xiaowu of Northern Wei, seeking to assert power independent of the paramount general Gao Huan, fled to Yuwen's domain; when Gao subsequently proclaimed Emperor Xiaojing of Eastern Wei emperor, a split of Northern Wei was effected, and when Yuwen subsequently poisoned Emperor Xiaowu to death around the new year 535 and declared his cousin Yuan Baoju emperor (as Emperor Wen), the split was formalized, with the part under Gao's and Emperor Xiaojing's control known as Eastern Wei and the part under Yuwen's and Emperor Wen's control known as Western Wei. For the rest of his life, Yuwen endeavored to make Western Wei, then much weaker than its eastern counterpart, a strong state, and after his death, his son Yuwen Jue seized the throne from Emperor Gong of Western Wei, establishing the Northern Zhou dynasty.

== Early career ==
Yuwen Tai was born in 505, and was a descendant of the last chieftain of the Xianbei Yuwen tribe Yuwen Yidougui, whose tribe was destroyed by Murong Huang, the founding ruler of Former Yan. Yuwen Yidougui's descendants served as generals during Former Yan and its successor state Later Yan. Later, when Emperor Daowu of Northern Wei defeated the Later Yan emperor Murong Bao (Emperor Huimin), Yuwen Tai's great-great-grandfather Yuwen Ling (宇文陵) surrendered to Northern Wei, and was relocated to Wuchuan (武川, in modern Hohhot, Inner Mongolia). Yuwen Tai's father Yuwen Gong (宇文肱) was known for his ability in battle. In 524, with Northern Wei's northern provinces overrun by agrarian rebels in the revolt of the Six Garrisons, Wuchuan was being held by one of the major rebels, Poliuhan Baling (破六韓拔陵). Yuwen Gong and another local leader, Heba Duba (賀拔度拔), ambushed Poliuhan's general Wei Kegu (衛可孤) and killed Wei, temporarily restoring order. It was probably at this time that Yuwen Tai met and befriended Heba Duba's son Heba Yue. Sometime after this incident, Yuwen Gong and his sons fled to Zhongshan (中山, in modern Baoding, Hebei), and were forced to join the army of another rebel general, Xianyu Xiuli (鮮于修禮). Yuwen Gong died in a battle between Xianyu's troops and Northern Wei troops, but Yuwen Tai continued to serve in Xianyu's troops. After Xianyu was killed by his general Yuan Hongye (元洪業) in 526, another Xianyu general, Ge Rong, in turn killed Yuan and took over Xianyu's troops, and Yuwen continued to serve Ge. However, he saw that Ge was not a competent leader and considered fleeing with his brothers, but before he could carry out his plans, Ge was defeated by the Northern Wei general Erzhu Rong in 528, and Erzhu forcibly moved Ge's troops to his power base at Jinyang (晉陽, in modern Taiyuan, Shanxi). Suspicious of the Yuwen brothers, Erzhu killed Yuwen Tai's older brother Yuwen Luosheng (宇文洛生), but Yuwen Tai pleaded his case with Erzhu and was spared.

In 529, the Northern Wei prince Yuan Hao, under support from the Liang dynasty, attacked Emperor Xiaozhuang and seized the capital Luoyang, declaring himself emperor. Emperor Xiaozhuang fled north of the Yellow River, and Erzhu advanced south to aid him, sending Heba Yue, who was then serving under Erzhu, to lead his forward troops. Heba made Yuwen Tai his assistant, and later on, after Erzhu defeated Yuan Hao, allowing Emperor Xiaozhuang to return to Luoyang, Yuwen was created the Viscount of Ningdu.

In 530, Erzhu Rong sent his nephew Erzhu Tianguang, with Heba and Houmochen Yue as assistants, to attack the rebel general Moqi Chounu, who then occupied the western provinces. Yuwen continued to serve under Heba. After Erzhu Tianguang defeated Moqi, Yuwen, who contributed in the campaign, was made the governor of Yuan Province (原州, roughly modern Guyuan, Ningxia), and he was said to have ruled the province with such kindness and faith that the people of the province proclaimed, "Had we had Governor Yuwen as our governor earlier, how would we have joined the rebellion?"

Late in 530, apprehensive that Erzhu Rong would eventually seize the throne, Emperor Xiaozhuang ambushed him and killed him in the palace. Subsequently, Erzhu Rong's clan members, led by his nephew Erzhu Zhao and cousin Erzhu Shilong, defeated and killed Emperor Xiaozhuang, first making Yuan Ye the Prince of Changguang emperor, and then further replaced Yuan Ye with Emperor Jiemin. In 531, the general Gao Huan rebelled against the Erzhus. Erzhu Tianguang was initially not particularly interested in aiding his Erzhu clan members, but felt compelled to, and he departed Chang'an to head east. While Erzhu Tianguang was away, Yuwen advised Heba to rise against the Erzhus, and Heba did, defeating Erzhu Tianguang's brother Erzhu Xianshou (爾朱顯壽), whom Yuwen subsequently captured, dividing control of the territory with Houmochen. By 532, Gao had defeated the Erzhus and seized power, deposing Emperor Jiemin and making Emperor Xiaowu emperor instead. When Gao subsequently tried to intimidate Heba into giving up his territory and reporting to Luoyang, but under the advice of Xue Xiaotong (薛孝通), Heba refused. He made Yuwen his lieutenant, and consulted him on most important matters. In 533, Yuwen volunteered to serve as messenger to Gao in order to observe Gao's abilities, and Heba agreed. When Gao met Yuwen, Gao was impressed by the answers Yuwen had to his questions and wanted to detain Yuwen, but Yuwen left Gao's domain before Gao could seize him. Subsequently, Heba sent Yuwen to confer with Emperor Xiaowu, who was not happy about Gao's hold on power, and Emperor Xiaowu and Heba were able to enter into a secret alliance against Gao. Heba made Yuwen the governor of the key Xia Province (夏州, roughly modern Yulin, Shaanxi).

== Taking control over western provinces ==
By this point, Heba Yue, in alliance with Houmochen Yue, controlled almost all of the western provinces. However, one provincial governor, Cao Ni (曹泥), the governor of Ling Province (靈州, roughly modern Yinchuan, Ningxia), was aligned with Gao Huan and refused to follow Heba's orders. Heba Yue sent his assistant Zhao Gui to Xia Province to request Yuwen's opinions, and Yuwen, believing that Houmochen was unreliable, advised against an attack on Cao and suggested instead that Houmochen be attacked. Heba refused—not realizing that by this point, Gao's messengers had persuaded Houmochen to act against him. Heba and Houmochen rendezvoused at Gaoping (高平, in modern Guyuan, Ningxia), and then headed north against Cao—but as they advanced, Houmochen tricked Heba into coming to his camp for discussions, and then had his son-in-law Yuan Hongjing (元洪景) assassinate Heba. Initially, Heba's army was surprised and intimidated, but Houmochen, instead of taking over Heba's army, panicked and fled to Shuiluo (水洛, in modern Pingliang, Gansu), while Heba's army, without a central commander, withdrew to Pingliang (平涼, also in modern Pingliang). After some internal discussions, the army commanders decided to offer the command to Yuwen Tai, and they sent Du Shuozhou (杜朔周, later changed his name to Helian Da (赫連達)) to Xia Province to summon Yuwen Tai. Yuwen agreed, and Du and he quickly headed back toward Heba's army. (Note: On the way, they encountered Gao's general Hou Jing, whom Gao had sent to try to take over Heba's army; Hou, surprised, withdrew to Gao's territory quickly.)

Emperor Xiaowu, hearing of Heba's death, sent Yuan Pi (元毗) to summon both Yuwen and Houmochen to Luoyang. Houmochen outright refused, and Yuwen persuaded Emperor Xiaowu to allow him to remain in command. Emperor Xiaowu agreed. Yuwen next sent a letter to Houmochen to rebuke him, and when Houmochen did not answer, prepared to launch an attack on Houmochen. He advanced quickly on Shuiluo, and Houmochen withdrew to Lüeyang (略陽, in modern Tianshui, Gansu), and then to Shanggui (上邽, also in modern Tianshui). He then further withdrew from Shanggui, and Shanggui surrendered to Yuwen. He decided to try to flee to Cao's territory, but on the way, believing that Yuwen's forces were close, committed suicide.

== Alliance with Emperor Xiaowu ==
Gao Huan made an overture of alliance to Yuwen Tai, but Yuwen refused, instead arresting Gao's messengers and delivering them to Emperor Xiaowu. Emperor Xiaowu authorized him to take over Heba's authorities in the west and created him the Duke of Lüeyang.

Meanwhile, Emperor Xiaowu prepared for an attack on Gao, but meanwhile claimed to Gao that he was preparing to attack Yuwen and Heba Yue's brother Heba Sheng, who controlled the southern provinces. Gao saw through Emperor Xiaowu's trick, and in summer 534, he instead advanced south toward Luoyang. Emperor Xiaowu's associate Wang Sizheng, believing that imperial forces would not be able to withstand an attack from Gao, suggested fleeing to Yuwen's domain—despite his own reservations about Yuwen's intentions. Emperor Xiaowu agreed, but at the same time summoned Heba Sheng. However, Heba Sheng did not arrive at Luoyang, while Yuwen sent forces east, commanded by Li Xian (李賢), to welcome Emperor Xiaowu. In fall 534, before Gao's forces arrived, Emperor Xiaowu fled west, meeting Li on the way. Li escorted Emperor Xiaowu back to Yuwen's headquarters at Chang'an, and Emperor Xiaowu reestablished the imperial government there. He made Yuwen his commander in chief, and married his sister Princess Pingyi (冯翊公主) to Yuwen.

After Gao entered Luoyang, he sent messengers to request Emperor Xiaowu to return to Luoyang. When Emperor Xiaowu ignored his request, Gao made his distant nephew, Yuan Shanjian, emperor (as Emperor Xiaojing), dividing Northern Wei into two, with Eastern Wei recognizing Emperor Xiaojing, and Western Wei recognizing Emperor Xiaowu.

Yuwen's relationship with Emperor Xiaowu, however, soon deteriorated. Emperor Xiaowu had engaged in incestuous relationships with three of his cousins, at least one of whom, Yuan Mingyue (元明月) the Princess Pingyuan, followed him to Chang'an. Yuwen disapproved of the relationship, and he persuaded the imperial princes to arrest Yuan Mingyue and put her to death. Emperor Xiaowu became angry, and he often showed his displeasure by tightening his bow or by pounding his table in the palace. Around the new year 535, Yuwen poisoned him to death and made his cousin Yuan Baoju the Prince of Nanyang (Note: Yuan Mingyue's brother) emperor (as Emperor Wen).

== During Emperor Wen's reign ==
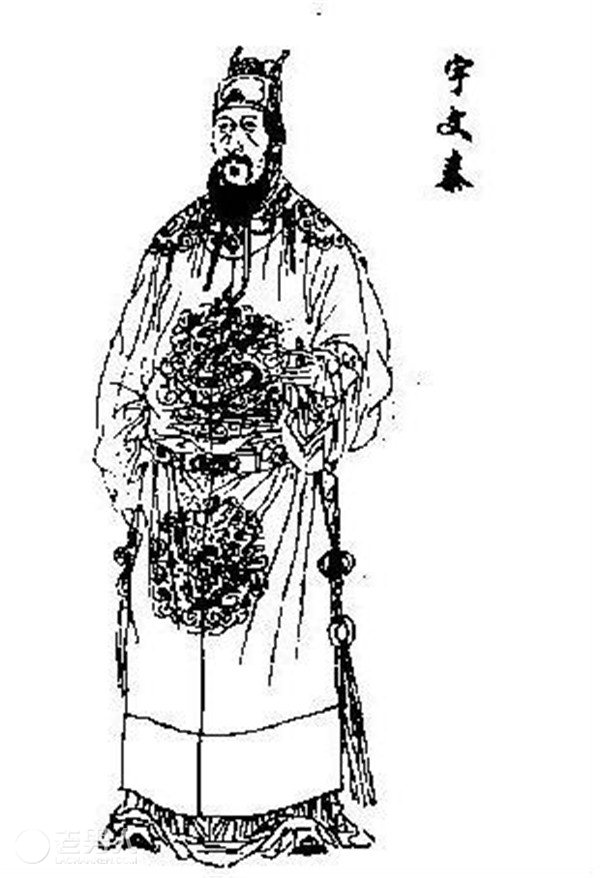
Yuwen Tai

Western Wei was, initially, the smaller and the weaker of the two successor states of Northern Wei, and early in its existence, there were questions on whether it would survive at all. Yuwen Tai spent much of his effort on preserving existence of Western Wei against repeated attacks led by Gao Huan. He also gradually began to show a trend of following both ancient Chinese customs, as largely encapsulated by the governmental structures of the Zhou dynasty, and restoring Xianbei customs that had largely been abolished by Emperor Xiaowen of Northern Wei. In this, he was assisted by the official Su Chuo (蘇綽). (Note: faher of Su Wei) He also worked on earning the respect of other officials and generals, including Emperor Xiaowu's confidant Wang Sizheng and Pei Xia (裴俠), both of whom had initially been suspicious of Yuwen and yet later became important and faithful generals serving under him.

The Volcanic winter of 536 had led to famine in the Guanzhong region that year. Probably in conjunction, in spring 537, Gao Huan and his generals Dou Tai and Gao Aocao launched a major attack on Western Wei. (Note: Eastern Wei also suffered from the volcanic winter, with hailstorms and drought across multiple commanderies in autumn 536.) Yuwen, correctly judging that Gao Huan was trying to draw Yuwen toward him while allowing Dou to penetrate Western Wei defenses, announced that he was going to lead a withdraw to modern eastern Gansu but instead made a surprise attack on Dou's army at Xiaoguan (小關, in modern Sanmenxia, Henan), crushing Dou's forces. Dou committed suicide in shame. Gao Huan and Gao Aocao were forced to withdraw. In fall 537, Yuwen led an attack on Eastern Wei and captured Hengnong (恆農, in modern Sanmenxia as well). With Western Wei's capital region Guanzhong suffering from a famine, Yuwen remained in Hengnong to collect food from the area, but then heard that Gao Huan was again launching another attack from the northeast, forcing him to return to the Guanzhong region. The forces engaged at the Battle of Shayuan (沙苑, in modern Weinan, Shaanxi), after Gao rejected advice from his general Hulü Qiangju (斛律羌舉) to directly attack the Western Wei capital Chang'an. Despite Eastern Wei's numerical superiority, Yuwen's forces crushed Gao's forces, and Gao was forced to withdraw. In winter 537, the Western Wei general Dugu Xin captured the former Northern Wei capital Luoyang, and several other nearby provinces also surrendered to Western Wei.

In spring 538, in order to create an alliance with Rouran, Yuwen first had Emperor Wen bestow the title of Princess Huazheng to Yuan Yi (元翌), the daughter of a member of the imperial clan, to marry her to Yujiulü Tahan (郁久閭塔寒), the brother of Rouran's Chiliantoubingdoufa Khan Yujiulü Anagui. But Yuwen, believing that to be insufficient, requested Emperor Wen divorce his wife Empress Yifu and marry Yujiulü Anagui's daughter. Emperor Wen was forced to agree, and he deposed Empress Yifu, ordering her to become a Buddhist nun, and married Yujiulü Anagui's daughter as empress. (Note: In 540, under Rouran pressure, Empress Yifu would be forced to commit suicide.)

By summer 538, however, Eastern Wei generals Hou Jing and Gao Aocao had surrounded Luoyang. Yuwen and Emperor Wen proceeded to Luoyang to try to lift the siege. When Yuwen arrived, Hou and Gao initially lifted the siege on Luoyang, but when Yuwen chased after them, his horse was shot by an arrow, and he fell off his horse and was nearly captured, but both he and his general Li Mu (李穆) pretended to be common soldiers and were able to escape. Once Yuwen returned to Western Wei camp, Western Wei forces again attacked and killed Gao. Later that day, however, an Eastern Wei counterattack inflicted major losses on Western Wei forces, forcing Yuwen to withdraw and rendezvous with Emperor Wen at Hengnong. Meanwhile, however, Eastern Wei captives in Chang'an heard of the Western Wei defeat and rebelled within the city, led by the general Zhao Qingque (趙青雀), forcing the official Zhou Huida (周惠達), who had been left in charge of Chang'an, to flee the city with the crown prince Yuan Qin. Under the advice of Lu Tong (陸通), Yuwen quickly returned west and defeated Zhao, suppressing his rebellion. Around this time, Yuwen also started setting up his headquarters at Hua Province (華州, roughly modern Weinan), not far from Chang'an but maintaining some distance from the capital, incorporate many talented officials and generals into his staff. He further established a night school for the junior officers and officials in his administration at Hua Province.

In 541, under Su's suggestion, Yuwen had Emperor Wen issue an edict outlining six principles of government, intending to reduce corruption and wastefulness and strengthen the economy:

1. Qingxinsi (清心思) -- ordering the officials to clean their hearts and not desire many things.
2. Dunjiaohua (敦教化) -- instituting a regime of moral education.
3. Jindili (盡地利) -- the concept of encouraging agriculture and maximizing the utility of the land.
4. Zhuoxianliang (擢賢良) -- finding capable individuals to promote, regardless of their family backgrounds.
5. Xuyusong (恤獄訟) -- forbidding torture and instituting the concept that it would be preferable to let the guilty go than to punish an innocent.
6. Junfuyi (均賦役) -- the concept that tax and labor burdens must be fair, and that powerful families may not avoid them.

Yuwen ordered that all of the officials of the state must study the six principles and further be able to balance budgets, at the pain of being relieved from their offices.

In spring 543, the Eastern Wei official Gao Zhongmi (高仲密), the governor of North Yu Province (北豫州, roughly modern Zhengzhou, Henan), angry that Gao Huan's son Gao Cheng had tried to rape his second wife, and in a dispute with Gao Cheng's assistant Cui Xian (崔暹) over his having divorced Cui's sister, rebelled and surrendered his headquarters of Hulao (虎牢, in modern Zhengzhou) to Western Wei. Yuwen personally led troops to try to save Gao Zhongmi. At Luoyang, however, he was defeated by the Eastern Wei general Peng Le and was nearly captured, only managing to elude capture by throwing gold at Peng to bribe him and persuade him that if he captured Yuwen, he would be no longer be any use to Gao Huan. The next day, a Western Wei counterattack in turn almost killed Gao Huan, but was ultimately unsuccessful. Yuwen was forced to withdraw, but against advice from Feng Zihui (封子繪) and Chen Yuankang (陳元康), Gao Huan failed to chase Yuwen and allowed him to escape. The defeat was considered so major that Yuwen offered to have his rank reduced, but Emperor Wen did not accept the request.

In 545, Yuwen, seeing that one of Rouran's vassals, Tujue, was growing in strength, sent a messenger, Annuo Pantuo (安諾槃陀) to Tujue to greet its chief Ashina Tumen, to try to establish friendly relations.

In 546, Gao Huan launched another major attack on Western Wei, putting Yubi (玉壁, in modern Yuncheng, Shanxi) under siege, intending to draw Western Wei forces to try to save Yubi, but Yuwen took no reaction to it, instead leaving Yubi's defense to the general Wei Xiaokuan. Wei ably defended Yubi, draining the strength of the Eastern Wei forces, and as Gao grew ill, Eastern Wei forces were forced to withdraw with major losses.

Later in 546, Su died. Yuwen mourned him greatly, and personally attended Su's burial, crying bitterly.

In spring 547, the Eastern Wei general Hou Jing, who was in charge of Eastern Wei provinces south of the Yellow River, believing that Gao Huan had died (indeed, Gao had, although his son Gao Cheng was keeping the death a secret) and not willing to submit to Gao Cheng, surrendered the provinces initially to Western Wei and then to Liang. Yuwen conferred honorary titles on Hou, but was initially unwilling to send relief troops. With Wang Sizheng advocating taking four provinces that Hou offered in exchange for aid, however, Yuwen sent Li Bi and Zhao Gui to assist Wang, initially forcing Eastern Wei forces attacking Hou to withdraw. Soon, however, Western Wei generals and Hou began to suspect each other, and after Yuwen ordered Hou to proceed to Chang'an to greet Emperor Wen and Hou refused, the sides officially broke, and the Western Wei generals held onto the four provinces without rendering further aid to Hou, who from that point on depended solely on Liang aid. (Later that year, however, the Eastern Wei general Murong Shaozong would crush Liang forces commanded by Xiao Yuanming, the nephew of Emperor Wu of Liang, capturing Xiao Yuanming, and then in early 548 defeat Hou and force him to flee to Liang, taking all of the provinces back except the four that Western Wei had taken.)

In summer 548, Yuwen and Yuan Qin the Crown Prince carried out a tour of Western Wei's border provinces, but upon hearing that Emperor Wen was ill, cut their tour short and returned to Chang'an. However, when they did, Emperor Wen had already been healed, and Yuwen thereafter returned to his headquarters at Hua Province.

Around the same time, the Eastern Wei general Gao Yue (高岳, Gao Huan's cousin) launched an attack on Yingchuan (潁川, in modern Xuchang, Henan), one of the major cities that Western Wei took from Hou. Wang, defending Yingchuan, initially repelled Eastern Wei's attacks, but with Eastern Wei diverting Wei River (洧水) to flood Yingchuan, it was in the danger of falling. Yuwen sent Zhao to try to lift the siege, but Zhao was impeded by the water and was unable to proceed to Yingchuan. A counterattack by Wang, however, killed Murong Shaozong and Liu Fengsheng (劉豐生), temporarily relieving the pressure on Yingchuan. Gao Cheng himself reinforced Gao Yue's army, and by summer 549 captured Yingchuan, taking Wang captive. With Yingchuan having fallen, Yuwen ordered a general withdrawal from the area, and the provinces taken from Hou were retaken by Eastern Wei.

Meanwhile, with Hou having rebelled against Liang's Emperor Wu in 548 and captured the Liang capital Jiankang in 549, Liang was in disarray, with Hou and the various imperial princes and governors fighting for control. By winter 549, one of the Liang princes, Xiao Cha the Prince of Yueyang (Emperor Wu's grandson), fearing an attack from his uncle Xiao Yi the Prince of Xiangdong (Emperor Wu's son), surrendered his domain around the city Xiangyang (襄陽, in modern Xiangfan, Hubei) to Western Wei, requesting protection. Yuwen sent the general Yang Zhong to aid Xiao Cha, and after Yang defeated and captured Xiao Yi's general Liu Zhongli (柳仲禮) in spring 550, Western Wei made peace with Xiao Yi, setting the borders in such a way to put Xiao Cha under Western Wei's protection. Yuwen created Xiao Cha the title "Prince of Liang," preparing to have him claim the Liang throne as Western Wei's vassal.

In summer 550, Gao Cheng's brother Gao Yang, who had controlled the Eastern Wei government after Gao Cheng's death in 549, forced Eastern Wei's Emperor Xiaojing to yield the throne to him, ending Eastern Wei and starting Northern Qi (as its Emperor Wenxuan). In response, Yuwen launched a major attack on the newly established Northern Qi, reaching Jian Province (建州, roughly modern Jincheng, Shanxi). However, Gao Yang himself led a strong army to defend against Yuwen's attack, and Yuwen, upon hearing that Gao Yang's army was well-run, made the comment, "Alas, Gao Huan is not dead." Meanwhile, due to rains, the livestock that Western Wei forces relied on were dying in large numbers, and so Yuwen was forced to retreat. While there appeared to be few casualties, Northern Qi was in turn able to make minor border gains in light of Yuwen's withdrawal.

Around the new year 550, another son of Liang's Emperor Wu, Xiao Guan (蕭綸) the Prince of Shaoling, attempted to recapture Anlu (安陸, in modern Xiaogan, Hubei), which Yang had earlier captured from Xiao Yi. Yuwen sent Yang to relieve Anlu, and Yang not only did so, but proceeded to siege Xiao Guan's headquarters at Ru'nan (汝南, in modern Jingmen, Hubei), capturing it and then executing Xiao Guan.

It is known that at some point in Emperor Wen's reign, the emperor entrusted Yuwen to foster the crown prince Yuan Qin. Yuan Qin was 7 at that time. Later he would arrange a marriage between his eldest daughter Empress Yuwen, and Yuan Qin.

In spring 551, Emperor Wen died, and Yuan Qin succeeded him (as Emperor Fei).

== During Emperors Fei's reign ==
Yuwen Tai appeared to hold an even firmer grip on power after Emperor Wen's death. Emperor Fei's wife Empress Yuwen was Yuwen Tai's daughter, and it was recorded that he did not have any concubines because he loved her greatly.

In summer 551, the Tiele were launching an attack on Rouran, when Tujue's chieftain Ashina Tumen intercepted the Tiele and captured a large number of the Tiele people. Ashina Tumen, after his victory, sought a marriage with a daughter of Yujiulü Anagui. Yujiulü Anagui felt insulted and refused, viewing the Tujue as inferior; in response, Ashina Tumen cut off relations with Rouran. Yuwen took this opportunity to create an alliance with Tujue, sending the Princess Changle to Tujue to marry Ashina Tumen.

In summer 552, with Xiao Yi and Hou Jing battling each other, Xiao Yi sought help from Western Wei and agreed to cede Nanzheng (modern Hanzhong, Shaanxi) to Western Wei, but the order was declined by Xiao Yi's cousin, Xiao Xun (蕭循). Yuwen and his general Daxi Wu (達奚武) thus attacked Hanzhong. Xiao Xun instead turned to another brother of Xiao Yi, Xiao Ji the Prince of Wuling for aid, and Xiao Ji sent reinforcements commanded by the general Yang Qianyun (楊乾運). Yuwen and Daxi put Nanzheng under siege, and due to the length of the siege, Yuwen and Daxi became angry and ordered that the city be slaughtered when it falls, but at the intercession of Xiao Xun's chief of staff Liu Fan (劉璠), whom Western Wei forces captured during the siege and whose talent Yuwen respected, Yuwen rescinded the order. Soon thereafter, Xiao Xun surrendered, and Nanzheng was in Western Wei hands. Yuwen initially agreed to allow Xiao Xun to return to Liang, but instead detained him, releasing him only after Liu again persuaded him to do so, reminding him of his promise. (During the conversation Liu had with Yuwen, Liu commented that he initially thought of Yuwen as Tang of Shang and King Wu of Zhou, but because of his failure to follow his promise, found him to be less than Duke Huan of Qi and Duke Wen of Jin. Yuwen instead compared himself to Yi Yin (伊尹, a legendary regent of Shang dynasty) and Duke of Zhou, apparently disavowing intentions on the throne for the time being.)

In spring 553, with Xiao Ji and Xiao Yi, both of whom having claimed Liang's imperial title after Hou's fall, battling each other, Xiao Yi sought aid from Western Wei, requesting Western Wei to attack Xiao Ji's home base of Chengdu (成都, in modern Chengdu, Sichuan) from the rear. Yuwen sent his nephew Yuchi Jiong to attack Xiao Ji's domain (modern Sichuan and Chongqing). Most of Xiao Ji's domain fell into Western Wei hands, and subsequently, Xiao Ji was defeated and captured by Xiao Yi.

In winter 553, the imperial official Yuan Lie (元烈) formed a conspiracy to kill Yuwen, but the news leaked. Yuwen killed him. Following Yuan Lie's death, Emperor Fei himself was angry and wanted to kill Yuwen, despite advise from his cousins Yuan Yu (元育) the Prince of Huaiai and Yuan Zan (元贊) the Prince of Guangping. However, Emperor Fei's apparent attempt to court the imperial guards became known by the commanders, several of whom were Yuwen's sons-in-law, and Yuwen put Emperor Fei under house arrest and then deposed him, replacing him with his younger brother Yuan Kuo the Prince of Qi (as Emperor Gong). Yuwen took this opportunity to change the Han names for the Xianbei that Emperor Xiaowen had instituted back to the original Xianbei names, including changing the imperial surname Yuan back to Tuoba. Further, because Xianbei legends indicated that originally, the Tuoba tribe had 36 subtribes and 99 subclans, Yuwen chose 36 key Han generals and 99 commanders and changed their names to Xianbei names, to fill out the original names. Yuwen subsequently put the former emperor to death. It was recorded that Empress Yuwen, Yuwen Tai's daughter, also "suffered death because of her loyalty to Wei," but it is not known exactly whether Yuwen killed her.

== During Emperor Gong's reign ==
In spring 554, while on a diplomatic mission to Liang (now with Xiao Yi as its undisputed emperor—as Emperor Yuan), the Western Wei official Yuwen Renshu (宇文仁恕, probably Yuwen Tai's relative but relationship is unclear) was slighted by Emperor Yuan, who treated Northern Qi's ambassador with far greater respect. Emperor Yuan then further aggravated the situation by sending an impolite letter to Yuwen Tai demanding that the borders be redrawn in accordance with old borders. Yuwen made the comment, "Xiao Yi is the type of person that, as said in proverbs, 'One who has been abandoned by heaven cannot be revived by anyone else.'" Yuwen Tai therefore began to prepare attacking Emperor Yuan at his headquarters of Jiangling (江陵, in modern Jingzhou, Hubei), as Emperor Yuan had made Jiangling his capital and declined to move back to the old capital Jiankang. The Western Wei general Ma Bofu (馬伯符), formerly a Liang general, secretly revealed the attack plans to Emperor Yuan, but Emperor Yuan did not believe Ma and took minimal precautions.

In the winter of 554, under Yuwen Tai's orders, Western Wei forces, commanded by Yu Jin, who was assisted by Yuwen Tai's nephew Yuwen Hu and Yang Zhong, launched a major attack on Liang. Emperor Yuan initially did not take reports of the Western Wei attack seriously, and while he summoned his major generals Wang Sengbian and Wang Lin from afar, he himself took little defensive or evasive actions. Yu quickly descended on Jiangling and put it under siege. Soon, Emperor Yuan surrendered, and Western Wei forces gave him to Xiao Cha to be executed. Western Wei created Xiao Cha the Emperor of Liang (as Emperor Xuan) and gave him the Jiangling area (known in history as Western Liang) in exchange for his old domain of Xiangyang area, which Western Wei took control directly. (However, the rest of Liang did not recognize Emperor Xuan, and soon recognized a rival candidate for the throne supported by Northern Qi, Emperor Yuan's cousin Xiao Yuanming.) Most residents of Jiangling were seized as slaves, although eventually most of them were released by Yuwen after he was persuaded to do so by one of the captives, the Liang official Yu Jicai (庾季才).

Around the near year 556, after Tujue's Mugan Khan Ashina Qijin thoroughly crushed Rouran's last khan Yujiulü Dengshuzi, Yujiulü Dengshuzi fled to Western Wei. Ashina Qijin demanded the execution of Yujiulü Dengshuzi, and Yuwen Tai, fearing a Tujue attack, turned Yujiulü Dengshuzi and 3000 of his followers to the Tujue ambassadors, who slaughtered them.

Also around the new year 556, Yuwen Tai promulgated a new government structure, dividing the government into six ministries, based on the Zhou dynasty model. (This structure was initially devised by Su Chuo, and after Su Chuo's death, Yuwen had it further revised by Lu Bian (盧辯).) He also had Tuoba Yu the Prince of Huai'an submit a request, and then have Emperor Gong formally approve the request, to have all imperial princes reduced in rank to dukes, in accordance with the Zhou tradition.

In the spring of 556, Yuwen was pondering the issue of succession. His wife Princess Pingyi had one son, Yuwen Jue, but his oldest son, Yuwen Yu, was born of his concubine Lady Yao, and was married to the daughter of one of his chief generals, Dugu Xin. On the advice of Li Yuan (李遠), who argued that the son of a wife always had precedence over the son of a concubine, Yuwen Tai made Yuwen Jue his heir apparent.

in the fall of 556, while Yuwen Tai was on a tour of the northern provinces, he became ill at Qiantun Mountain (牽屯山, in modern Guyuan, Ningxia). He summoned his nephew Yuwen Hu to Qiantun and entrusted the affairs of the state as well as his sons to Yuwen Hu. He soon died, and Yuwen Jue took over his titles, while Yuwen Hu took the reins of the state, and under Yuwen Hu's tutelage, Yuwen Jue soon took the throne from Emperor Gong, ending Western Wei and establishing Northern Zhou.

== Family ==
Consort(s) and their respective issue:

- Empress Wen, formerly Princess Pingyi, of the Yuan clan of Henan (文皇后 河南元氏; d. 551)
  - Yuwen Jue, Emperor Xiaomin (孝閔皇帝 宇文覺; 542–557), third son
- Empress Xuan, of the Chinu clan (宣皇后 叱奴氏; d. 574)
  - Yuwen Yong, Emperor Wu (武皇帝 宇文邕; 543–578), fourth son
  - Yuwen Zhi, Prince Weila (衛剌王 宇文直; d. 574), sixth son
- Madame, of the Yao clan (夫人 姚氏)
  - Yuwen Yu, Emperor Ming (明皇帝 宇文毓; 534–560), first son
- Consort, of the Dabugan clan (妃 達步幹氏)
  - Yuwen Xian, Prince Yang of Qi (齊煬王 宇文憲; 545–578), fifth son
- Madame, of the Quan clan (夫人 權氏)
  - Yuwen Jian, Prince Xiao of Qiao (譙孝王 宇文儉; 551–578), eighth son
- Madame, of the Wuliuhun clan (夫人 烏六渾氏), personal name Xianyu (顯玉)
  - Yuwen Tong, Prince Kang of Ji (冀康王 宇文通; 555–571), 12th son
- Lady, of the Wang clan (王氏)
  - Yuwen Zhao, Prince Jian of Zhao (趙僭王 宇文招; d. 581), seventh son
- Lady, of the Zhang clan (張氏), personal name Nübi (女畢)
  - Yuwen Da, Prince Bi of Dai (代奰王 宇文達; d. 581), 11th son
- Unknown
  - Yuwen Zhen, Duke Xian of Song (宋獻公 宇文震; d. 550), second son
  - Yuwen Chun, Prince Huo of Chen (陳惑王 宇文純; d. 581), ninth son
  - Yuwen Sheng, Prince Ye of Yue (越野王 宇文盛; d. 581), tenth son
  - Yuwen You, Prince Wen of Teng (滕聞王 宇文逌; 556–581), 13th son
  - Empress Yuwen (宇文皇后; d. 554), first daughter
    - Married Yuan Qin, Emperor Fei of Western Wei ((西)魏廢帝; 525–554)
  - Princess Xiangyang (襄陽公主), fifth daughter
    - Married Dou Yi of Henan (河南 竇毅; 519–583), and had issue (two sons, two daughters), their daughter Lady Dou would later become the wife of Li Yuan, the founding emperor of the Tang dynasty
  - Princess Yi'an (義安公主)
    - Married Li Hui of Liaodong (遼東 李暉)
  - Princess Shunyang (順陽公主)
    - Married Yang Zan (楊瓚; 550–591)
  - Princess Pingyuan (平原公主)
    - Married Yu Yi of Henan (河南 於翼; d. 583), and had issue (three sons)
  - Princess Yongfu (永富公主)
    - Married Shi Xiong (史雄)
  - Princess Xihe (西河公主)
    - Married Liu Chang (劉昶; d. 597)
  - Princess Yigui (義歸公主)
    - Married Li Ji (李基; 531–561), and had issue (one son)
  - Princess Yidu (宜都公主)
    - Married Liang Rui (梁睿; 531–595)
  - Princess Deguang (德廣公主)
    - Married Zhao Yongguo of Tianshui (天水 趙永國; d. 557)
  - Lady Yuwen (宇文氏)
    - Married Heba Wei (賀拔緯)
  - Lady Yuwen (宇文氏)
    - Married Ruogan Feng (若干鳳)
