= Gao Aocao =

Eastern Wei general (501–538)

Gao Ang
- 高昂
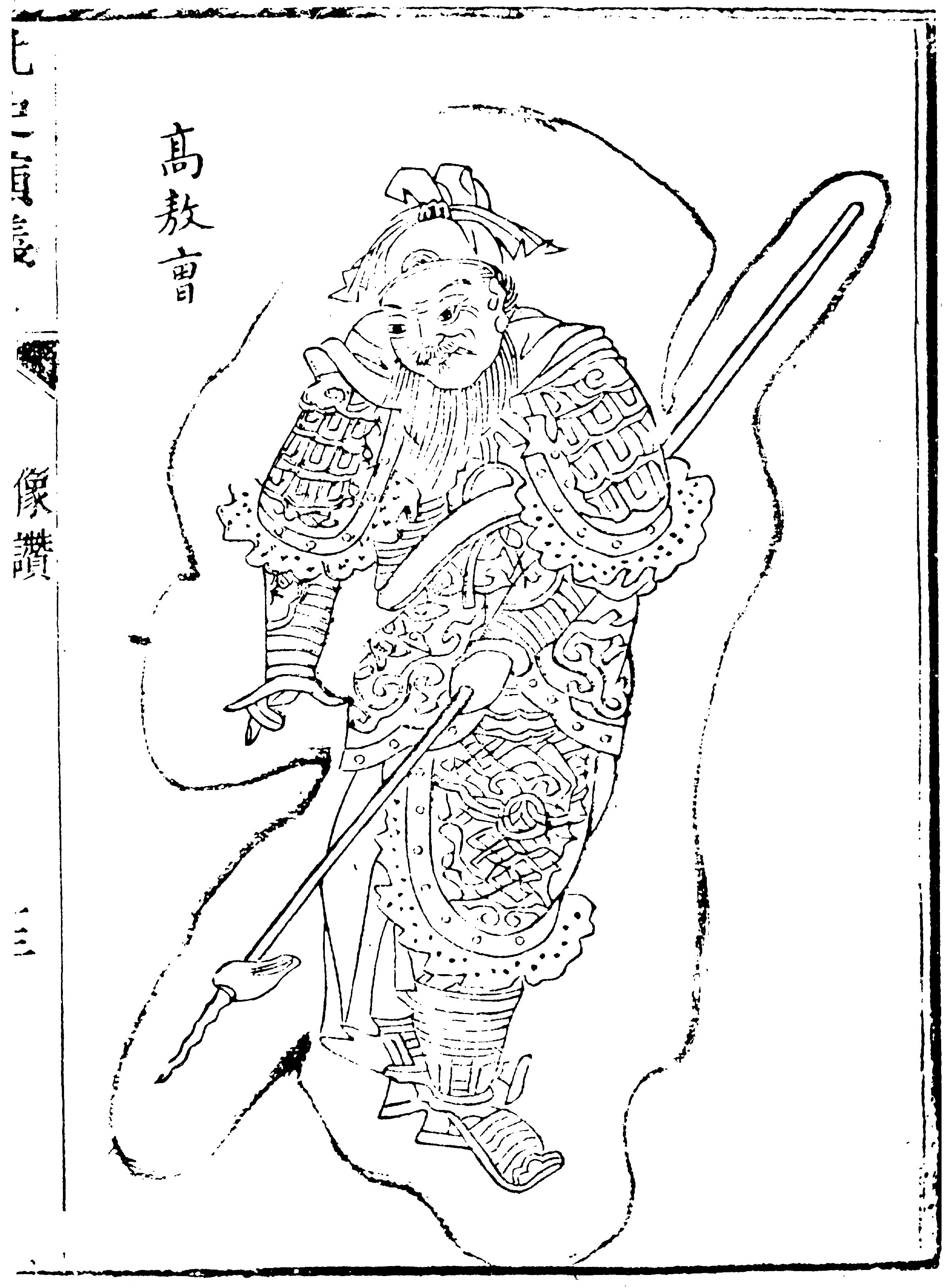

Minister over the Masses (司徒)
- In office 534–538
- Monarch: Emperor Xiaojing of Eastern Wei

Personal details
- Born: 501 Jing County, Hebei
- Died: September 538 (aged 36–37) Jiaozuo, Henan
- Relations: Gao Qian (First brother); Gao Shen (Second brother); Gao Jishi (Fourth brother)
- Children: Gao Tuqi; Gao Daohuo
- Parent(s): Gao Yi (Father); Lady Zhang (mother)
- Courtesy name: Aocao (敖曹)
- Peerage: Duke of Jingzhao Commandery (京兆郡公)
- Posthumous name: Zhongwu (忠武); Prince of Yongchang (永昌王)

Gao Ang (501–September 538), courtesy name Aocao, better known as Gao Aocao (高敖曹), was a Chinese military general of the Northern Wei and Eastern Wei dynasties during the Northern and Southern dynasties period. During the fall of the Northern Wei, he and his brother, Gao Qian raised an army in rebellion and fought against Erzhu Rong and his clan. He later joined Gao Huan and the Eastern Wei, fighting in the Xiaoguan and Shayuan campaigns before dying in the Battle of Heqiao.

Likened in martial prowess to Xiang Yu by the people of his time, Gao Aocao stood out among Gao Huan’s Xianbei-dominated military for commanding the bulk of the Chinese forces, he himself being an ethnic Han. After his death, he was deeply mourned by Gao Huan, and he was posthumously honoured by the Eastern Wei and Northern Qi dynasties.

== Background ==
Gao Aocao was a member of the Gao clan of Bohai Commandery as the third son of the Northern Wei official, Gao Yi (高翼). The Book of Northern Qi describes him as having “dragon-like eyebrows” and a “leopard-like neck” with an outstanding physique. In his youth, he showed little interest in academics. Though his father assigned him a strict tutor who would severely punish him, Gao Aocao ignored his teachings and spent his time travelling the empire. According to him, he saw no use in sitting around to become a scholar when he could roam around to accumulate wealth.

He and his brother, Gao Qian frequently engaged in robbery and used their family wealth to gather swordsmen. The people in counties and commanderies all dared not to oppose them, but on the other hand, their father had to serve several prison sentences for their crimes. Gao Yi often told others in regards to Gao Aocao, “If this child doesn’t bring disaster to my clan, then surely he will bring honour to us, even more than just a hero of the state.”

== War against the Erzhu clan ==
=== Ge Rong’s rebellion ===
In 528, Gao Aocao and Gao Qian started a rebellion between the Yellow and Ji rivers. They joined forces with the rebel, Ge Rong and received official titles from him. The brothers repeatedly defeated the Wei armies sent to quell them, but eventually, Gao Qian decided to surrender when he received a direct order from Emperor Xiaozhuang of Northern Wei, who was a childhood friend. Gao Aocao followed his brother in surrender, and he was appointed Communications Cavalier Regular Attendant and bestowed the title of Earl of Wucheng County.

However, the paramount leader of Wei, Erzhu Rong, thought it inappropriate that the Gao brothers, only recently rebelling, be granted important titles and thus sent them home. Back in their hometown, the brothers gathered more followers and resumed their plundering. Subsequently, Erzhu Rong secretly ordered the governor, Yuan Yi (元嶷) to capture Gao Aocao and imprison him at Jinyang.

=== Brief service under Emperor Xiaozhuang ===
When Erzhu Rong returned to the capital, Luoyang in fall 530, he brought along Gao Aocao and locked him up in the Camel and Oxen Bureau. On 1 November, Erzhu Rong was ambushed and assassinated by Emperor Xiaozhuang, who had become apprehensive of his overbearing power over the government. Gao Aocao was freed after the assassination, but now, Luoyang was threatened by Erzhu Rong’s family members from all directions. He was grateful for his release, and when Xiaozhuang personally went to the Daxia Gate (大夏門; on the northern wall of Luoyang) to command the troops, he “donned his armour and grabbed his spear, volunteering himself to fight against the invaders. Together with his nephew, Gao Changming (高長命), he led the army forward and was unbeatable, impressing many onlookers including the emperor himself.

Hearing the situation in Luoyang, Gao Qian rushed to the capital from Ji province to support the emperor. Xiaozhuang assigned Gao Qian as Ambassador to Hebei and Gao Aocao as General of the Guards before ordering them to return to their hometown to recruit more soldiers. Just as they were about to leave, the emperor brought them to the bank of the Yellow River, raised his wine cup, pointed at the river and told them, “You brothers are the true heroes of Ji province, capable of rousing soldiers to fight to the death. If any change befalls the capital, you may raise dust for me along the river.” Gao Qian tearfully accepted his order, while Gao Aocao drew his sword and performed a dance, swearing to die.

=== Rebellion in Xindu and joining Gao Huan ===
In January 531, Luoyang fell and Emperor Xiaozhuang was executed by the Erzhu forces. Upon receiving the news, Gao Aocao, his father and brother took up arms in Xindu. The Inspector of Yin province, Erzhu Yusheng (爾朱羽生) brought 5,000 soldiers to quell their uprising. As the attackers encroached on to their city, Gao Aocao, with not even time to wear his armour, reportedly led a few dozen cavalrymen out to face them. Gao Qian was worried that his brother would be defeated, so he lowered 500 men with ropes down the city walls to chase after him. However, by then, Gao Aocao had fought and defeated Erzhu Yusheng.

Soon, Gao Qian contacted the Inspector of Jin province, Gao Huan and offered him to lead the rebellion against the Erzhu family and welcome him to Xindu. Gao Aocao was away on a campaign at the time and was unhappy by the decision. He disparaged his brother by mockingly sending him women’s clothing and refusing to return to Xindu. Gao Huan was also member of the Gao clan of Bohai, albeit a very distant relative of Gao Aocao and his branch. To win him over, Gao Huan sent his son, Gao Cheng to meet Gao Aocao with the proper etiquette due for a granduncle. Finally convinced by Gao Huan’s sincerity, Gao Aocao returned to Xindu together with Gao Cheng.

=== Battle of Hanling ===
In October that same year, Gao Huan installed Yuan Lang as the new emperor, and Gao Aocao was given tally and appointed Inspector of Ji province and Senior General of Chariots and Cavalry. He was later promoted to Grand Chief Controller and followed Gao Huan in defeating Erzhu Zhao at Guang’a (廣阿, in modern Xingtai, Hebei).

In 532, Gao Huan faced the Erzhu clan in a decisive battle at Hanling. Among Gao Huan’s military cabinet, Gao Aocao led the largest contingent of Han Chinese troops, with two of his subordinate generals, Wang Taotang (王桃湯) and Dongfang Lao (東方老), also being Chinese. At the time, the Chinese were mostly agrarian farmers while the Xianbei were seen as combat-ready people. Gao Huan voiced his concern to Gao Aocao about the capability of his Chinese troops and suggested that he send his Xianbei cavalry against the enemy instead. However, Aocao stated that his troops were well-trained and had fought in many battles, insisting that Gao Huan dispatch him without the need of the Xianbei. Thus, his request was granted, and he accompanied Gao Huan with 3,000 of his own troops.

During the initial bout, Gao Huan was defeated by Erzhu Zhao and issued a retreat, enticing the latter to take advantage by pursuing him. Erzhu Zhao’s forces were eventually held up in the front by Gao Huan’s general, Gao Yue while another general, Hulü Jin gathered his scattered soldiers and attacked Erzhu Zhao’s rear. Then, Gao Aocao and Cai Jun (蔡俊), with 1,000 soldiers, marched out from Liyuan and led an assault on Erzhu Zhao’s flank. Gao Huan’s generals dealt the Erzhu forces a great defeat, scattering their leaders and allowing Gao Huan to occupy Luoyang. For his contributions, Gao Aocao was appointed Palace Attendant and bestowed the title of Marquis of Wucheng County.

== Campaign against Emperor Xiaowu ==
After the victory at Hanling, Gao Huan had Yuan Lang deposed and replaced him with Yuan Xiu, posthumously known as Emperor Xiaowu of Northern Wei, as he was closer to the imperial lineage. However, Gao Huan and the new emperor were soon engaged in a power struggle for the government which Gao Qian became entangled in. In 533, Xiaowu ordered for Gao Qian’s execution and secretly instructed the Inspector of Eastern Xu province, Pan Shaoye (潘紹業) to kill Gao Aocao. However, Aocao was able to find out about his brother’s death beforehand, so he ambushed the army sent after him and captured Pan Shaoye alive. He then fled with a few dozen followers to Gao Huan’s base at Jinyang. When he saw Gao Aocao, Gao Huan hugged him and said “The emperor has wronged the Minister of Works (Gao Qian)!”

In 534, when Gao Huan brought his army to attack Luoyang under the pretext of killing Emperor Xiaowu’s ally, Husi Chun, Gao Aocao was placed in command of the vanguard. The emperor fled west to the Guanzhong region with the intention of joining the general, Yuwen Tai. Aocao led 500 light cavalry and chased after Xiaowu as far as the Xiao Mountains, but was unable to capture him and returned. Afterwards, he was appointed by Gao Huan as Inspector of Yu province and pacified the local forces around the Three Jings region that refused to submit.

In October that same year, Gao Huan installed Yuan Shanjian as the new emperor, posthumously known as Emperor Xiaojing of Wei. After moving the capital to Ye, Gao Huan appointed Gao Aocao as the Minister of Internal Affairs. He was also supposed to receive the office of Minister of Works, but turned it down, since Gao Qian had held the position before he was killed. Thus, Gao Aocao was made the Minister over the Masses instead.

== Service under Eastern Wei ==
=== Battle of Xiaoguan ===
In January or February 537, taking advantage of a famine in the Guanzhong, Gao Huan invaded Yuwen Tai’s state of Western Wei. Gao Aocao was appointed Grand Chief Controller of the Southwestern Circuits and sent to conquer Shangluo. While crossing the Yellow River, he prayed to the god of the Yellow River, Hebo, stating, “Hebo is the god of water, Gao Aocao is the tiger of the land. For I now pass through your domain, let us both share a drink together.” The mountain roads to Shangluo were steep and the strategic passes were occupied by bandits. Nonetheless, Aocao pushed through and was undefeated in his advance.

Meanwhile, two locals of Shangluo, Quan Yue (泉岳) and Quan Menglue (泉猛略), along with a native of Shunyang, Du Qiu (杜竄), were conspiring to surrender the city to Gao Aocao. The Administrator, Quan Qi discovered their plot and had Quan Yue and Quan Menglue killed, but Du Qiu was able to escape and fled to Gao Aocao. With Du Qiu as his guide, Aocao laid siege on Shangluo for more than ten days before finally capturing the city.

With Shangluo under his control, Gao Aocao wanted to press on towards Lantian Pass, but he then received news that the Eastern Wei forces under Dou Tai had been destroyed, and that Gao Huan had ordered him to retreat alone. Aocao was unwilling to leave his men behind, so he led them in his retreat and fought hard to bring them home. During the retreat, Gao Aocao was struck by a stray arrow and severely wounded. In that moment, he told others that his only regret in death was that he would never see his younger brother, Gao Jishi, become the Inspector of Ji province. When Gao Huan learnt of this statement, he immediately gave Gao Jishi the office.

=== Battle of Shayuan ===
Gao Aocao soon recovered from his injury and returned to his military office, now leading 76 chief controllers under his command and training soldiers at Hulao with Hou Jing, Ren Xiang and others. Gao Huan's military was mostly led by the Xianbei, who often looked down upon the Han Chinese officials but were all fearful and respectful of Gao Aocao. He was placed in high regard by Gao Huan; whenever he speaks to his Xianbei generals, Gao Huan would communicate to them in their language, but if Aocao was present among them, he would switch to speaking Chinese. On one occasion, Aocao paid a visit to Gao Huan's residence, but the guard captain refused to let him in, so Aocao angrily shot him with his bow and arrow. Gao Huan knew about the incident, but did not punish Aocao.

In the aftermath of the Battle of Xiaoguan, the Eastern Wei had to cede a substantial amount of territory north of the Yellow River, so in October or November 537, Gao Huan attacked Pujin. Gao Aocao was ordered to invade the Henan region, and so he besieged the city of Hongnong. As he was attacking the city, however, he received news that Gao Huan was defeated at Shayuan (沙苑; in present-day Dali County, Shaanxi), which caused him to lift the siege and withdraw back to Luoyang. Soon, the Western Wei general, Dugu Xin arrived at Xin’an, and Aocao had to retreat north of the Yellow River. After the battle, Aocao's peerage was promoted to the Duke of Jingzhao County.

=== Battle of Heqiao and death ===
In July or August 538, Gao Huan sent Gao Aocao, Hou Jing and others to besiege Dugu Xin at Jinyong Fortress (金墉城; near Luoyang). Around this time, it was recorded that Aocao had a servant named Jingzhao (京兆) who he killed for stealing his sword from one of his maidservants. Before his death, Jingzhao pleaded "I saved your life three time. How could you kill me for such a trivial matter?" That night, Aocao had a dream where Jingzhao smeared his blood onto him. When he woke, he angrily instructed his men to break Jingzhao's legs.

In response to the attack, Yuwen Tai brought his forces to reinforce Dugu Xin. Aocao underestimated the strength of the enemy force, ordering his soldiers to raise the flags and get into formation to face the enemy. The Western Wei armies thus concentrated their forces onto Aocao, destroying his entire army and forcing him to flee alone to Heyang (河陽; in present-day Jiaozuo, Henan). The Administrator of Heyang, Gao Yongle (高永樂), had a personal grudge against Aocao and closed the gates to deny him entry. When Aocao called out for a rope to be lowered, his request was ignored, prompting him to draw his sword and chop at the gate. His pursuers arrived before he could break into the city, so he quickly hid under the city bridge. However, the pursuers spotted one of Aocao's servants holding a golden belt and asked him about his whereabouts. As the servant pointed towards the bridge, Aocao raised his head out and shouted, "Come, I shall make you a Founding Duke!" The pursuers then beheaded him and left the scene.

== Posthumous honours ==
Gao Huan mourned greatly over Gao Aocao's death and had Gao Yongle beaten with 200 sticks. He posthumously appointed Aocao as the Grand Preceptor, Grand Marshal, Grand Commandant and Manager of the Affairs of the Masters of Writing, as well as gave him he posthumous name of Zhongwu (忠武; "Loyal and Valorous"). In 560, Gao Huan's son, Emperor Xiaozhao of Northern Qi, further gave him the posthumous title of Prince of Yongchang and enshrined his name in the temple of Emperor Wenxiang (Gao Cheng).

== Anecdotes ==
=== Dispute with Liu Gui ===
Gao Aocao was once playing wo shuo (握槊; a game similar to Backgammon) with the Inspector of Northern Yu province, Zheng Yanzu (鄭嚴祖) when the Assistant to the Imperial Counsellor, Liu Gui, sent an envoy to summon Zheng. Aocoa refused to let Zheng leave and locked the envoy in a wooden yoke. In his yoke, the envoy mocked Aocao by saying, "It's much easier to put on a yoke than it is to take it off." Aocao then ordered for his neck to be chopped off with a sword before saying, "What's so difficult about that?" When Liu Gui heard about the incident, he did not pursue the matter any further.

The following day, Aocao and Liu Gui were sitting together when they received report that many of the Han Chinese labourers working around the Yellow River had died from drowning. Liu Gui, who was of Xiongnu background, replied, "A Han is worth a coin each, let them all die!" Gao Aocao was angered by the remark and drew his sword to attack Liu Gui, causing him to flee back to his camp. Aocao then ordered his men to beat the drums and prepare to attack Liu Gui's camp. It was not until he was persuaded by his peers, Hou Jing and Moqi Luo that Aocao decided to stop.

== Sources ==
- Book of Northern Qi, vol. 21
- History of the Northern Dynasties, vol. 31
- Zizhi Tongjian, vol. 152, 154, 155, 156, 157 and 158
