= Peng Le =

Eastern Wei and Northern Qi general (died 551)

- 彭樂
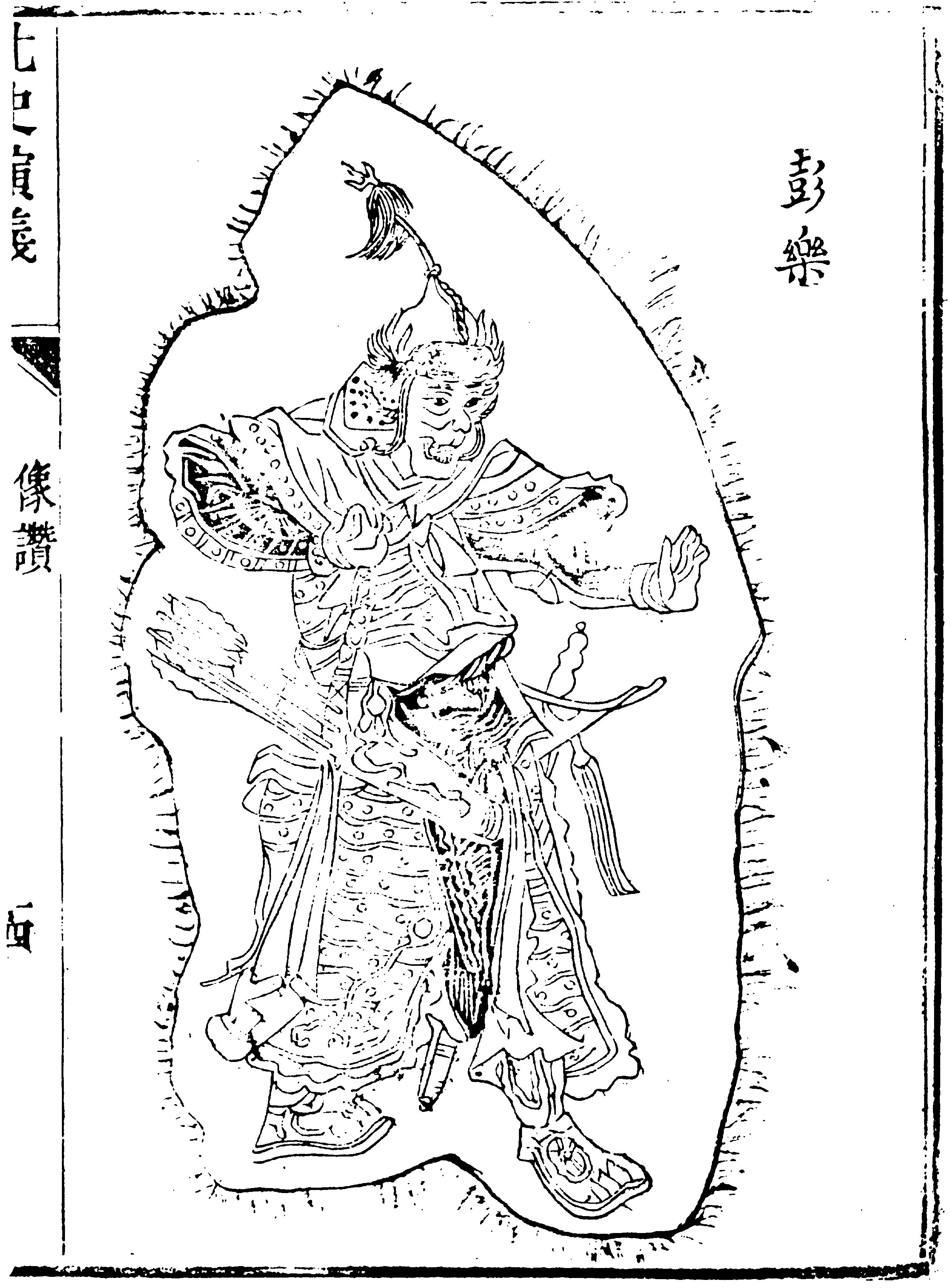

Grand Marshal (大司馬)
- In office 550–551
- Monarch: Emperor Wenxuan of Northern Qi

Personal details
- Born: Unknown Ningxia or Shaanxi
- Died: 10 March 551
- Children: Lady Peng (daughter)
- Courtesy name: Xing (興)
- Peerage: Prince of Chenliu (陳留王)

Peng Le (died 10 March 551), courtesy name Xing, was a military general of the Northern Wei, Eastern Wei and Northern Qi dynasties during the Northern and Southern dynasties period. Initially a member of Du Luozhou's rebellion, he later followed Gao Huan and participated in his campaigns against the Erzhu clan and the Western Wei. At the Battle of Mount Mang, he led the Eastern Wei to their biggest victory over the Western Wei, but was severely reprimanded for allowing the western paramount leader, Yuwen Tai to escape following a close encounter.

Though considered one of Gao Huan's bravest generals, his history of defections and insubordination led others to believe he harboured secret ambitions. Shortly after the Northern Qi was established, he was accused of treason and sentenced to death.

== Service under Erzhu Rong ==
A native of Anding Commandery, Peng Le was known for his courage and skills in horse riding and archery. In 525, he joined Du Luozhuo when he rebelled at Shanggu Commandery, but losing confidence in the rebellion, he surrendered to the Northern Wei commander, Erzhu Rong. In 528, he followed Erzhu Rong in defeating the rebel, Ge Rong at Fukou (滏口; northwest of present-day Ci County, Hebei) and was subsequently made a Chief Controller. That same year in October or November, he along with Gao Huan and Yu Hui (于暉) defeated the Administrator of Taishan, Yang Kan, who rebelled against Wei at Xiaqiu (瑕丘; in modern Jining, Shandong).

In January or February 529, Peng Le, while serving as Yu Hui's Chief Controller during his campaign against the rebel, Xing Gao, led 2,000 soldiers to defect to Ge Rong's former subordinate, Han Lou in You province. Peng Le was enfeoffed the King of Beiping, but when Erzhu Rong sent the general, Hou Yuan against them, he revolted against Han Lou and surrendered back to Wei.

== Service under Gao Huan ==
=== Campaign against the Erzhu clan and Emperor Xiaowu ===
In 531, Peng Le sided with Gao Huan, now the Inspector of Jin province, in his war against the Erzhu clan and accompanied him in his eastward campaign. In June or July, Peng Le was one of the generals sent to attack the Inspector of Yin province, Erzhu Yusheng (爾朱羽生). His peer, Gao Qian, personally went to meet Yusheng and pretended to share his war plans. After Yusheng left the city to recruit more troops, Peng Le pursued him before capturing and killing him on horseback.

In 532, Gao Huan faced Erzhu Zhao at the decisive battle of Hanling. During the battle, Peng Le was the first to charge against the enemy and rout them. For his contributions in the battle, he was bestowed the title of Duke of Lecheng County. Later on, his military achievements saw his peerage promoted to Duke of Miyang, and he was appointed Inspector of Si province. Peng Le also participated in Gao Huan’s campaign against Emperor Xiaowu of Northern Wei in 534.

=== Battle of Shayuan ===
Peng Le continued to serve Gao Huan when he installed Emperor Xiaojing to the throne, establishing the Eastern Wei. In 537, Gao Huan brought his forces to face the Western Wei, led by Yuwen Tai, at the Battle of Shayuan. Initially, he wanted to drag the Western Wei into a drawn-out battle, but Peng Le angrily demanded for a decisive victory, stating, “We are many and the enemies are few. Like taking one with a hundred men, we must not let this opportunity slip away.” Thus, Gao Huan led his men into battle.

According to the History of the Northern Dynasties, Peng Le was drunk at the battle and took advantage of his condition to penetrate deep into the Western Wei lines, fighting with enemy forces led by Yuwen Hu. He was wounded in several areas, but most notably, he was stabbed in the abdomen which caused his intestines to flow out of his body. He was unable to fully plug his intestines back in, so he had to cut a part of them off before continuing to fight. Peng Le defeated Yuwen Hu and killed more than 30,000 Western Wei troops. Despite his heroics, Gao Huan ultimately suffered a heavy defeat at Shayuan, and he often cited this battle to Peng Le as a warning.

=== Battle of Mount Mang ===
In 543, the Inspector of Northern Yu province, Gao Zhongmi, rebelled against the Eastern Wei, surrendering his territory over to Yuwen Tai. Gao Huan once again marched out to face Yuwen Tai, this time at Mount Mang (邙山; north of Luoyang, Henan). When Gao Huan received a report from his scout that the Western Wei soldiers were only eating dry ration, he ordered his army into formation and awaited the enemy arrival, hoping they would be weakened by thirst. He then sent Peng Le, who commanded the right wing, with several thousand elite cavalries to lead an assault on the Western Wei army from the north.

The Western Wei armies were taken by surprise and retreated when Peng Le's cavalry struck them. Soon, he and his men managed to storm into Yuwen Tai’s main camp. On the Eastern Wei side, it was reported to Gao Huan that Peng Le had rebelled, to which he responded, “[Peng] Le abandoned Han Lou for Erzhu Rong, then betrayed the Erzhu to join me, and has now rebelled to go west. Why should success and failure depend on Le? All I can say is that scoundrel is simply repeating himself.” Dust clouds eventually emerged in the northwest. Peng Le sent his messenger to report his victory; he had captured more than 50 generals, including a few Western Wei princes, and had them all tied up and beaten with swords, forcing them to say their names.

The Eastern Wei generals capitalized on Peng Le’s success and killed more than 30,000 Western Wei soldiers. As the Western Wei retreated, Gao Huan sent Peng Le to chase after them. Yuwen Tai was distraught by the pursuit, and according to the History of the Northern Dynasties, he reportedly turned around and said to Peng Le, “Fool! Without me today, where will you be tomorrow? Why don’t you hurry back to the main camp and collect your gold and treasure?” Peng Le followed his words and claimed Yuwen Tai’s gold belt from the camp.

When he returned, Peng Le boasted that Yuwen Tai barely escaped him and fled in fear. Gao Huan questioned him further, to which Peng Le reported Yuwen Tai’s words but denied letting him go for that reason. Although Gao Huan was elated by his great victory, he was extremely furious at Peng Le for allowing Yuwen Tai to escape. Gao Huan forced the general to lie prone and personally pressed his head to the ground with his hand, chastising him for their previous defeat at Shayuan while drawing his sword three times as he considered killing him. However, after a long period of silence, Gao Huan decided to spare him. Peng Le volunteered to go back and capture Yuwen Tai with 5,000 cavalries, but Gao Huan denied his request and instead rewarded him with 3,000 rolls of silk.

== Service under Gao Cheng ==
In 547, Gao Huan died of illness and was succeeded as Prime Minister by his eldest son, Gao Cheng. Before his death, he advised Gao Cheng, “Peng Le is a rare confidant. Do well to protect him.”

In March or April 548, Peng Le and Yue Xun (樂恂) fought the Western Wei general, Pei Kuan at Xincheng (新城; located between modern Neixiang and Dengzhou in Henan) and captured him. At the same time, the powerful Eastern Wei commander, Hou Jing rebelled, and the Western Wei general, Wang Sizheng took advantage of the rebellion to occupy Yingchuan Commandery. In April or May, Gao Cheng ordered Hulü Jin to lead Peng Le, Kezhuhun Daoyuan and others to camp at Heyang (河陽; in modern Jiaozuo, Henan) and cut off Wang Sizheng’s escape route. In June or July 549, Yingchuan was recaptured by the Eastern Wei army, and the region east of Luyang County (魯陽; present-day Lushan County, Henan) submitted to Eastern Wei. Peng Le seized the opportunity to the Western Wei Inspector of Southern Jing province, Guo Xian at Luyang, but was unable to break through and retreated. He was later promoted to Inspector of Bing province.

== Service under Northern Qi and death ==
In 549, Gao Cheng was assassinated and his younger brother, Gao Yang succeeded him as Prime Minister. Peng Le was later appointed Minister of Works at the end of the year. After Gao Yang proclaimed himself as emperor (posthumously known as Emperor Wenxuan) and founded the Northern Qi dynasty in 550, Peng Le was promoted to Grand Marshal and conferred the title of Prince of Chenliu.

In February or March 551, Peng Le was accused of plotting a rebellion by the former Inspector of Xiang province, Liu Zhang (劉章) and others. The previous year, Mars was reportedly sighted approaching the north of the Room mansion and Lock asterism, which a fortune-teller read as a sign that a general will rebel. A Northern Qi divination book also contained the prophecy that “the Prince of Chenliu will enter Bing province”. For these reasons, Emperor Wenxuan ordered Peng Le to be executed.

His daughter, Lady Peng, was taken into Gao Yang’s harem after his death, and she later became a wife of Wenxuan’s brother, Emperor Wucheng of Northern Qi when he ascended the throne in 561.

== Anecdotes ==
=== Lu Cao's spear ===
The Erzhu clan had a strong general named Lu Cao (盧曹) who refused to serve under Gao Huan and fled to an island. There, he found the bones of a remarkably tall man. He decided to make two spears out of his shinbones, each 16 chi long, and sent one of them to Gao Huan. None of Gao Huan's generals were able to use it, but Peng Le was barely able to lift it.

=== Testing Gao Huan's sons ===
On one occasion, Gao Huan wanted to test the military abilities of his sons, so he sent them out with troops in all direction while secretly instructing Peng Le to lead his armoured cavalry to carry out a mock attack on them. All of Gao Huan's sons, including Gao Cheng, were fearful, but Gao Yang reacted calmly and ordered his men to fight back. Peng Le then took off his helmet and explained the situation to Gao Yang, but Gao Yang still captured him and presented him before Gao Huan.

== Sources ==
- Book of Northern Qi
- Book of Sui
- History of the Northern Dynasties
- Zizhi Tongjian
