= Hulü Jin =

Eastern Wei and Northern Qi general (488–567)

- 斛律金

Left Imperial Chancellor (左丞相)
- In office ?–567
- Monarch: Emperor Wu of Chen

Personal details
- Born: 488 Shuozhou, Shanxi
- Died: 567
- Children: Hulü Guang; Hulü Xian
- Parent: Hulü Danagui (father)
- Courtesy name: Aliudun (阿六敦)
- Original name: Hulü Dun (斛律敦)
- Peerage: Prince of Xianyang Commandery (咸陽郡王)
- Posthumous name: Wu (武)

Hulü Jin (488–567), courtesy name Aliudun, né Hulü Dun, was a Tiele military general and official of the Northern Wei, Eastern Wei and Northern Qi during the Northern and Southern dynasties period. A prominent chieftain among the Tiele, Hulü joined Gao Huan during his war against the Erzhu clan and participated in several battles against the Western Wei, becoming one of his most trusted companions. After Gao Huan's death, he continued to receive favour and rose to great prominence under the Northern Qi as his family members intermarried with the imperial Gao clan.

Hulü Jin is the earliest recorded person to sing the popular "Song of the Chile" (敕勒歌), and his son, Hulü Guang is also a famous general of the Northern Qi.

== Early life and career ==
Hulü Jin was a prominent chieftain among the Tiele people in Shuo Province. His great-grandfather was Hulü Beihouli (斛律倍侯利), who was a renowned figure in the frontier region for his strength and bravery. During the reign of Emperor Daowu (386–409), Beihouli led his family south to join the Northern Wei, where he was enfeoffed the Duke of Mengdu. Hulü Guang's grandfather, Hulü Fandijin (斛律幡地斤), served as a Central Master of Writing, while his father, Hulü Danagui (斛律大那瓌) served as a Household Counsellor.

Hulü Jin was described as a man of integrity who was skilled in horse riding and archery. He employed Xiongnu tactics in his military operations, knowing how to estimate the number of enemies by "observing the dust clouds" and calculating their proximity by "smelling the ground". In 521, he followed the commander of Huaishuo, Yang Jun in escorting the Rouran khan, Yujiulü Anagui back to the northern steppe, during which Hulü impressed Yujiulü with his archery skills during a hunting trip. When Anagui's forces raided Gaolu (高陸; southwest of present-day Gaoling, Shaanxi) in 523, Hulü Jin repelled him.

In 524, when Poliuhan Baling led an uprising along the Six Garrisons, Hulü Jin brought his people to join him and was enfeoffed as a king. However, realizing that the rebellion was bound for failure, Hulü led over 10,000 households to Yun province and surrendered back to the Wei. He was subsequently appointed as a Second-Rank Chieftain. In 525, Hulü Jin brought his followers further south, but as he left Huangguadui (黃瓜堆; northeast of present-day Shanyin County, Shanxi), he was attacked and defeated by the rebel leader, Du Luozhou. Many of Hulü's followers scattered, while he and his brother, Hulü Ping fled to join the commander, Erzhu Rong.

Erzhu Rong recruited Hulü Jin as a colonel and later promoted him to a Chief Controller. In 528, after Erzhu installed Emperor Xiaozhuang to the throne, Hulü was granted the title of Baron of Fucheng and appointed General Who Calms the Northern Frontiers and Colonel of the Garrison Cavalry. Hulü later participated in the suppression of Ge Rong's rebellion, as well as Yuan Hao and Chen Qingzhi's invasion of Luoyang. For his merits, he was promoted to Grand General who Guards the South.

== Service under Gao Huan ==
=== Campaign against the Erzhu clan ===
In 531, the Inspector of Jin province, Gao Huan raised an army in Xindu against the Erzhu clan's power over the government. Hulü Jin was one of the many people who assisted Gao in his plans. When Gao brought his army out to capture Ye, Hulü was appointed as Grand Chief Controller of the provinces of Heng, Yun, Yan, Shuo, Xian and Wei and entrusted with guarding Xindu and handling matters in the rear. In Gao's absence, Hulü campaigned against and defeated the rebel, Li Xiu (李修), earning him the office of Household Counsellor of the Right.

In 532, Hulü joined Gao's forces at Ye, and fought in the decisive Battle of Hanling against the Erzhu clan. He played a key role in regrouping Gao Huan's troops after their defeat in the initial bout and led his detachment to attack Erzhu Zhao's rear in the counterattack. After the victory at Hanling, Hulü was appointed Inspector of Fen province and Chief Controller of Dang province, while his fiefly title was elevated to Marquis. In 533, he followed Gao Huan's forces in wiping out Erzhu Zhao's forces at Chihong Ridge (赤洪嶺; in present-day Lishi District, Shanxi).

=== Battle of Shayuan ===
In 534, Hulü Jin participated in Gao Huan's campaign against Gedouling Yili (紇豆陵伊利). That same year, the Northern Wei was split into two, with Gao Huan controlling the Eastern Wei and Yuwen Tai leading the Western Wei. Gao ordered Hulü to garrison at Fengling (風陵; in present-day Ruicheng County, Shanxi) with 30,000 soldiers to protect from enemy attacks from te west. After his mission was completed, he returned to Gao's military base in Jinyang.

In 537, Hulü Jin followed Gao in his invasion of Western Wei, but his forces were ambushed and suffered a heavy defeat at Battle of Shayuan. Gao Huan considered regrouping his forces for another attack, but he later received news that many of his men were dead and there were no signs of communications from his troops on the other side. Hulü advised Gao "The troops are scattered and cannot be regrouped. We must immediately retreat east of the Yellow River." Feeling helpless, Gao remained on his horse unmoved, so Hulü had to whip his horse into retreating. Following the campaign, Hulü was assigned with Shedi Gan, Wei Jing and others to reclaim lost territories around eastern Yong province.

=== Battle of Heqiao ===
At the subsequent Battle of Heqiao in 538, Gao Huan led his troops to resist Yuwen Tai's invasion and ordered Hulü Jin to rush towards Qin province (秦州; around present-day Yuncheng, Shanxi) to form a pincer attack. When Hulü arrived at Jin province, he received news that the Western Wei army had retreated, so he changed course to join Xue Xiuyi in besieging the enemy at Qiaoshan (喬山; north of present-day Xiangfen County, Shanxi). Gao Huan quickly arrived at Qiaoshan to reinforce them, annihilating the Western Wei army. Hulü then followed Gao in capturing several cities including Nanjiang (南絳; in present-day Jiang County, Shanxi) and Shao Commandery (邵郡; soth of present-day Yuanqu County, Shanxi).

=== Battle of Mount Mang (543) ===
In 543, at the Battle of Mount Mang, Gao Huan ordered Hulü Jin to lead Liu Fengsheng, Budahan Sa (步大汗薩) and tens of thousands of soldiers to defend Heyang (河陽, roughly modern Jiaozuo, Henan). During the defence, Yuwen Tai retreated,and to prevent a pursuit, he sent fireboats upstream to burn down the bridge. Hulü ordered his subordinate, Zhang Liang (張亮) to load a hundred small boats with long chains. As the fireboats approached, they were caught by chains and steered towards the shore, thus saving the bridge. Once Gao arrived at Heyang, Hulü followed him in defeating Gao Zhongmi. After the campaign, Hulü was promoted to Grand Marshal and granted the title of Duke of Shicheng Commandery as well as the position of First-Tier Chieftain.

=== Campaign against the Shanhu ===
In 545, Hulü Jin played a commanding role in Gao's campaign against the Shanhu people. A two-prong attack, Hulü was instructed to secretly lead his forces through the southern route from Huangluo Ridge (黃櫨嶺; in present-day Lüliang, Shanxi) while Gao's forces went through the northern route. Once they both reached Wutu Fort (烏突戍; in present-day Lin County, Shanxi), they carried out a successful surprise attack on the Shanhu. Upon their return, Hulü was appointed Inspector of Ji province.

=== Battle of Yubi ===
In 546, in Gao's final military campaign to capture the key city of Yubi (玉壁, in modern Yuncheng, Shanxi), Hulü Jin was ordered to lead his troops along the Wusu Road (烏蘇道) to meet Gao at Jin province. Following a crushing defeat to the Western Wei, Gao Huan told Hulü to lead the remaining forces back to Jinyang. Gao Huan was seriously ill from the campaign, and a rumour began to spread among his soldiers that he had been killed by a crossbow. To calm them down, Gao Huan summoned all his generals for a banquet and ordered Hulü Jin to sing the "Song of Chile".

== Service under Gao Cheng ==
=== Hou Jing's Rebellion ===
In 547, Gao Huan succumbed to his illness and was succeeded by his eldest son, Gao Cheng. Before his death, Gao Huan advised Gao Cheng to trust Hulü Jin and Shedi Gan, stating, "The Old Xianbei, Shedi Gan and the Old Tiele, Hulü Jin are both upright and honest. They will never let you down." Shortly after, the general, Hou Jing rebelled in the Henan and surrendered to the Western Wei. Gao Cheng ordered Hulü Jin to lead Pan Le, Xuegu Yan and others to defend Heyang from Hou Jing's attacks. Meanwhile, the Western Wei dispatched Li Bi with tens of thousands of troops from Xincheng (新城; in present-day Xianyang, Shaanxi) to Yingchuan to reinforce Hou. In response, Hulü brought his troops to Guangwu, poising to intercept Li's forces. Noticing their arrival, Li Bi was forced to retreat. After returning from Heyang, Hulü Jin was appointed as Inspector of Si province. He continued to order his men to build Yangzhi (楊志), Baijia (百家) and Huyan (呼延) garrisons at Yiyang, where he later stationed his troops. Once the garrisons were completed, he then proceeded to take up his post in Si province (肆州, roughly modern Xinzhou, Shanxi).

=== Battle of Yingchuan ===
In 548, Hou Jing fled to the Liang dynasty in the south, and Gao Cheng now shifted his focus to Yingchuan, which had been captured by the Western Wei general, Wang Sizheng. He dispatched Gao Yue, Murong Shaozong, Liu Fengsheng and others to besiege Yingchuan. Meanwhile, Hulü Jin was instructed to lead Peng Le, Kezhuhun Daoyuan and others to camp at Heyang and cut off Wang Sizheng's retreat. Not long after, Hulü was ordered to join the attack on Yingchuan. After Wang Sizheng's surrender in 549, Hulü Jin was assigned to delivering grain from E'ban (崿坂; southeast of present-day Dengfeng, Henan) to Yiyang. The Western Wei general, Ma Shaolong (馬紹隆) occupied a strategic location to intercept Hulü Jin's grain train, but Hulü was able to repel him. For his military achievements, Hulü was given the additional fiefly title of Baron of Anping County.

== Service under Emperor Wenxuan ==
That same year, Gao Cheng was assassinated by a servant, and he was succeeded by his younger brother, Gao Yang. Thus far, the Gao family had been ruling behind Emperor Xiaojing of Eastern Wei, but Gao Yang now wanted to claim the throne from him. He relied on a prophecy from the scholar, Song Jingye (宋景業) and sent his cousin, Duan Shao to enquire Hulü Jin's opinion on the matter. Hulü firmly opposed the abdication and called for Song's execution for proposing treason, but despite oppositions from other officials as well, Gao Yang forced Emperor Xiaojing to step down and proclaimed himself emperor in 550, establishing the Northern Qi dynasty.

Gao Yang, posthumously known as Emperor Wenxuan, conferred Hulü Jin the title of Prince of Xianyang and allowed him to retain his position as Inspector. During a visit to Jinyang palace winter that year, Hulü fell ill, so the emperor personally visited him in his home, gifted him medicine and frequently sending envoys to offer condolences. After he recovered, Hulü returned to Si province. In 552, he was promoted to Grand Preceptor, and he later followed Emperor Wenxuan in his campaign against the Kumo Xi. After they returned, the emperor visited Si and held a banquet for him before bidding farewell.

In 553, Hulü Jin was dismissed as Inspector and summoned back to Jinyang to serve as Grand Preceptor. Emperor Wenxuan often visited his residence, bringing with him his concubines and princes to hold feasts that lasted late into the night. He promoted Hulü's son, Hulü Xian to Grand General of the Guards and also said to him, "You have rendered yourself meritorious in assisting me. For the loyalty of both father and sons, I shall marry you all into my family and make you my eternal defenders." He then had had Hulü Jin's grandson and the eldest son of Hulü Guang, Hulü Wudu marry the Princess Yining. On the day of the betrothal, Wenxuan brought his mother, Empress Dowager Lou Zhaojun, to Hulü Jin's home, along with Empress Zhaoxin, his Crown Prince, Gao Yin and the other princes.

Around this time on the northern steppe, the Rouran were defeated and scattered by the rising Göktürks. Worried that their defeat would lead to more raids on the northern border, the Northern Qi court ordered Hulü Jin to lead 20,000 cavalry to Baidao (白道; in modern Hohhot, Inner Mongolia) and stand guard. Hulü scouts reported that a Rouran chieftain, Doupotujiubei (豆婆吐久備) was planning to migrate westward with 3,000 households, so he led his troops to pursue them and captured them in one fell swoop. Later, another chieftain, Danbo (但鉢) also planned on moving his entire tribe to the west. Hulü captured his scouts and sent them to the capital before submitting a memorial that now was the appropriate time to attack the Rouran. Emperor Wenxuan led his troops and Hulü to ambush the Tulai tribe (吐賴) and captured more than 20,000 households. When they returned, Hulü was promoted to Right Imperial Chancellor and given the title of Khan of Qi province. He was later transferred to Left Imperial Chancellor.

In 554, Hulü Jin also followed Emperor Wenxuan in his campaign against the Shanhu people of Lüliang. He was ordered to lead his troops through Xian province (顯州, part of modern Xinzhou, Shanxi) while the Prince of Changshan, Gao Yan marched through Jin province to attack the Shanhu from two sides. The campaign was a success, and Emperor Wenxuan had many of the Shanhu people slaughtered and enslaved.

In his later reign, Emperor Wenxuan was said to have gone mad and acted violently to the people around him. On one occasion, it was recorded that the emperor was on his horse and attempted to stab Hulü three times. Hulü did not react and remained emotionless, eventually prompting Wenxuan to give up. Emperor Wenxuan died in 559 and was succeeded by his son, Emperor Fei.

== Later life and death ==
In 560, Hulü Jin sided with Empress Dowager Lou Zhaojun in her coup against the minister, Yang Yin and his associates. Not long after, Emperor Fei was forced to abdicate to his uncle, Gao Yan, posthumously known as Emperor Xiaozhao. The new emperor married Hulü Jin's granddaughter through Hulü Guang to his Crown Prince, Gao Bainian. In 561, Xiaozhao died and was succeeded by Emperor Wucheng, who treated Hulü with even greater respect and married another granddaughter of his to the new Crown Prince, Gao Wei.

At this point, Hulü Jin's family was one of the most powerful families in the empire, with his sons, Hulü Guang and Hulü Xian as well as grandson, Hulü Wudu all occupying important positions while his granddaughters were married into the imperial clan. Still, he warned Hulü Guang, "Though I am not well-read, I have heard that throughout history, relatives of the emperor such as Liang Ji all suffered disaster in the end. If a woman is favoured, then the nobles will be envious; if a woman is not favoured, then the emperor will despise her. Our family achieved wealth and honour through our deeds and loyalty. How can we only rely on our women?"

In 567, Hulü Jin died at the age of 80. Emperor Wucheng, who retired as emperor in favour of Gao Wei in 565, mourned him in the West Hall (西堂), while Gao Wei mourned him in Jinyang Court (晉陽宮). Hulü was posthumously granted tally and the Gilded Axe. He was also posthumously appointed Chief Controller of the Twelve Provinces of Shuo, Ding, Ji, Bing, Ying, Qing, Qi, Cang, You, Si, Jin, and Fen, Prime Minister, Grand Commandant, Manager of the Masters of Writing, Inspector of Shuo province, Chieftain and Prince of Xianyang among other titles. He was also given a million in cash and the posthumous name of "Wu". His son, Hulü Guang succeeded him, but just five years later, he and his family were falsely accused, and most of them were sentenced to death.

== Anecdotes ==
=== Changing his name ===
Described as a simple and honest person, Hulü Jin was also illiterate. He was initially known as Hulü Dun (斛律敦), but he found his given name, "Dun" (敦) difficult to write. He later changed his given name to "Jin" (金), which was simpler, and even then he struggled to write it. His peer, Sima Ziru taught him how to write his new name, and after building a new house, he had the character hung on his wall. Eventually, Hulü Jin was able to write his name.

=== Favour from the Gao clan ===
Hulü Jin was well-respected among Gao Huan and his family. Gao Huan warned Gao Cheng to take good care of Hulü, warning him, "Many of your envoys are Han Chinese. Do not trust anybody who brings harm to this man."

When his granddaughter married Gao Wei, Hulü Jin was summoned by Emperor Wucheng and given the special privilege of riding his carriage up the palace steps. On one occasion, Hulü visited Emperor Wucheng to present him with food as tribute, but the Interior Secretary, Li Ruo (李若) mistakenly reported that Hulü had come on his own. Emperor Wucheng left his palace to meet Hulü on his sheep cart with his Palace Attendant Gao Wenyao (高文遙) leading the way. Li Ruo soon realized his mistake and refused to leave the corridor. When Gao Wenyao returned with his report, Emperor Wucheng scolded Li Ruo, saying "You empty-headed idiot! You should be killed!" Despite his threat, the emperor did not punish Li.

== Sources ==
- Book of Northern Qi
- History of the Northern Dynasties
- Zizhi Tongjian
