= Shedi Gan =

Eastern Wei and Northern Qi general (died 553)

- 厙狄干/庫狄干

Grand Chancellor (太宰)
- In office 550–553
- Monarch: Emperor Wenxuan of Northern Qi

Personal details
- Born: 487 Yinchuan, Ningxia
- Died: 1 July 553
- Spouse: Princess Laoling
- Relations: Shedi Yuedoujuan (ancestor)
- Children: Shedi Fujing; Shedi Xian'an; Shedi Anding; Shedi Luo
- Courtesy name: Qianqiu (千秋)
- Peerage: Prince of Zhangwu Commandery (章武郡王)
- Posthumous name: Jinglie (景烈)

Shedi Gan (487–1 July 553), courtesy name Qianqiu, was a Xianbei military general of the Northern Wei, Eastern Wei and Northern Qi during the Northern and Southern dynasties period. He supported Gao Huan in his rebellion against the Erzhu clan and fought in several campaigns against the Western Wei, most notably at the Battle of Mount Mang in 543. He often led the vanguard into battle while also holding several high-ranking positions in the imperial government. After Gao Huan's death, Shedi Gan remained a trusted retainer to his sons, Gao Cheng and Gao Yang (Emperor Wenxuan of Northern Qi).

== Early life and career ==
Shedi Gan was the sixth generation descendant of Shedi Yuedoujuan (厙狄越豆眷). During the reign of Emperor Daowu (386–409), Shedi led his followers to join the Northern Wei, and because of his meritorious service, Daowu granted him 100 li of land in the western part of Shanwu Commandery (善無郡; south of present-day Youyu County, Shanxi). Later, Yuedoujuan led his followers further north to settle down in Shuofang Commandery.

Shedi Gan was described as a straightforward and reserved person with exceptional martial prowess. When the rebellion of the Six Garrisons broke out in 523, Shedi Gan fought against the rebels and was later rewarded the position of general and placed in charge of the imperial guards at Luoyang. As he and his family lived on the frontier where the climate was colder, Shedi was not used to the warmer weather at Luoyang, so the court allowed him to only work in the winter and return to his hometown in the summer.

In 525, as Du Luozhou and Ge Rong's rebellion broke out in the north, Shedi Gan was forced to flee to Yunzhong Commandery, where the Inspector of Shuo province, Fei Mu brought him to the commander, Erzhu Rong. In 528, Shedi followed Erzhu to Luoyang as one of his military generals.

== Service under Gao Huan and Gao Cheng ==
In 531, Shedi Gan supported the Inspector of Jin province, Gao Huan in his rebellion against the Erzhu clan at Xindu. In 532, he participated in the Battle of Hanling, contributing to Gao's decisive victory over the Erzhu coalition. Shortly after, Shedi Gan was ordered to march through Jingxing while Gao Huan marched through Fukou (滏口; northwest of present-day Ci County, Hebei) in an assault against Erzhu Zhao's base at Jinyang. When Gao's forces reached Wuxiang, Erzhu plundered and abandoned Jinyang for Xiurong (秀容, in modern Shuozhou, Shanxi), but faced with imminent defeat, he committed suicide in 533. After the war, Shedi Gan was enfeoffed the Duke of Guangping County, which was later promoted to a commandery.

In 534, the Northern Wei was split into two, with Gao Huan leading the Eastern Wei and Yuwen Tai leading the Western Wei. Shedi was appointed Inspector of Heng province and married Gao Huan's sister, Princess Laoling. In 536, he participated in Gao Huan's expedition to Xia province, during which they captured the region from Western Wei and accepted several defections from their generals.

In 537, the Eastern Wei was defeated by the Western Wei at the Battle of Shayuan. Shedi Gan along with Hulü Jin, Wei Jing and others were sent to recapture lost territory in Eastern Yong province. During the Battle of Heqiao in 538, Shedi Gan led the vanguard forces against the Western Wei. Though the Eastern Wei was victorious, Shedi was the only general to retreat. Gao Huan did not punish him, however, owing to his past achievements. In 540, Shedi Gan was appointed Grand Protector, and in 542, he was appointed Grand Tutor.

In 543, the Inspector of Northern Yu province, Gao Zhongmi rebelled and surrendered Hulao Pass to the Western Wei. Gao Huan rallied his forces to campaign against them, appointing Shedi Gan as Grand Chief Controller and assigning him to lead the vanguard. Along the way to the battlefield, Shedi opted not to stop by his hometown. When he saw his fellow general, Hou Jing, he refused to take the time to eat, so Hou had to send his cavalry to pursue him and deliver him his food. When the Eastern Wei forces reached Luoyang, they were hesitant to cross the Yellow River as they had to face a large army under Yuwen Tai. Eventually, Shedi Gan was the first to cross the river, enticing the rest of Gao Huan’s army to follow suit. The Eastern Wei won a decisive victory over the Western Wei in the end.

After the campaign, Shedi Gan was appointed Inspector of Ding province. As a civil administrator, he was always busy with official duties, which he often had trouble dealing with. However, he maintained a frugal character and did not cause problems for his officials.

In 547, Gao Huan died and was succeeded by his eldest son, Gao Cheng. Before his death, Gao Huan advised Gao Cheng, "The Old Xianbei, Shedi Gan and the Old Tiele, Hulü Jin are both upright and honest. They will never let you down." That same year, Shedi Gan was promoted to Grand Preceptor and participated in the suppression of Hou Jing's rebellion.

== Service under Northern Qi ==
In 550, Gao Yang, Gao Cheng's brother who succeeded him the prior year, established the Northern Qi dynasty. Shedi Gan was enfeoffed the Prince of Zhangwu Commandery and promoted to Grand Chancellor for his services. As he was married to Gao Huan's sister, he was also treated as a relative of the imperial family. He personally assisted the emperor and often led the generals into battle. Due to his prestige and fierce temperament, he was well-respected among all the generals.

Shedi Gan later died on 1 July 553. He was posthumously appointed Grand Chancellor and Bearer of the Gilded Axe. He was also awarded a chariot and the posthumous name of "Jinglie". In 560, during the reign of Emperor Xiaozhao, he was enshrined in Gao Huan's ancestral temple.

== Anecdotes ==
=== "Piercing a needle" ===
Shedi Gan was known to be illiterate, so much so that when he signed his given name "Gan" (干), he would write it from bottom to top, as opposed to top to bottom. The people of his time mockingly called this technique as "piercing a needle".

=== Reprimanding Yuan Xiaoyou ===
During a visit to Luoyang, the Prince of Linhuai, Yuan Xiaoyou (元孝友) made excessive remarks and jokes in public. None of the officials dared to rebuke him in person, until Shedi Gan sternly reprimanded him. Yuan Xiaoyou was put to shame, and the people praised Shedi Gan for his actions.

=== To capture Wei Jing ===
Shedi Gan and Wei Jing were both distinguished relatives of Gao Huan, and they were often entrusted with important matters whenever there was a military campaign. However, Wei Jing was avaricious and had a habit of taking bribes. Once, Shedi Gan and Wei Jing were discussing matters with Gao Huan, when Shedi suddenly requested to be appointed Lieutenant of the Imperial Censor. When asked by Gao why he would want a lowly position, Shedi replied, "I wish to capture Wei Jing!" to which Gao Huan laughed. (Note: The role of the Lieutenant of the Imperial Censor was to supervise military commanders and directly report their findings to the emperor.)

== Sources ==
- Book of Northern Qi
- Book of Zhou
- History of the Northern Dynasties
- Zizhi Tongjian
