= Murong Shaozong =

Eastern Wei general (501–549)

- 慕容紹宗

Left Supervisor of the Masters of Writing (尚書左僕射)
- In office 548–549
- Monarch: Emperor Xiaojing of Eastern Wei

Personal details
- Born: 501 Yu County, Hebei
- Died: April or May 549 Changge, Henan
- Relations: Murong Ke (ancestor); Murong Baole (brother); Erzhu Rong (cousin)
- Children: Murong Shisu; Murong Sanzang
- Parent: Murong Yuan (father)
- Courtesy name: Shaozong (紹宗)
- Peerage: Duke of Yan Commandery (燕郡公)
- Posthumous name: Jinghui (景惠)

Murong Shaozong (501–April or May 549), courtesy name Shaozong, was a military general of the Northern Wei and Eastern Wei dynasties during the Northern and Southern dynasties period. He was a member of the famous Murong clan and a cousin to the Northern Wei commander, Erzhu Rong. Following the defeat of the Erzhu clan, he joined Gao Huan but was initially excluded from holding significant military command. With the death of Gao Huan in 547, he was finally given the crucial task of quelling Hou Jing’s rebellion, where he distinguished himself by repelling an invasion by Liang forces and forcing Hou Jing out of the north. However, just a few months later, Shaozong died of drowning after a storm caused his boat to drift into enemy territory during the Battle of Yingchuan.

== Background ==
Murong Shaozong was a member of the Xianbei Murong clan and a descendant of Murong Ke, a great general and prince of the Former Yan dynasty during the Sixteen Kingdoms period. His great-grandfather was Murong Teng (慕容腾), who defected to the Northern Wei during the Later Yan period and settled down in Dai Commandery. His grandfather, Murong Du (慕容郁), was once the Inspector of Qing province, while his father, Murong Yuan (慕容遠), served as the Inspector of Heng province.

Shaozong was described as having a great stature, and though he was reserved, he was also brave and had a strategic mind. When the Rebellion of the Six Garrisons broke out in Northern Wei, he brought his family to Jinyang to join the Wei commander and his cousin, Erzhu Rong, who treated them kindly.

== Service under Erzhu Rong ==
In May 528, Erzhu Rong led his army towards Luoyang to depose Empress Dowager Hu. Along the way, he privately spoke to Shaozong about his intentions to slaughter the capital officials, thinking they would be difficult to control. Shaozong replied, “The Empress Dowager is promiscuous and has lost her way by abusing her powers and throwing the land into chaos. Hence, you, my lord, have raised an army to set straight the court. If you were to kill so many people no reason and without distinguishing loyalty and flattery, then I am afraid you will lose the goodwill of the world. This is not a long-term strategy.” However, Erzhu Rong refused to listen, leading to the infamous Heyin Massacre.

Afterwards, Murong Shaozong was given the title of Viscount of Suolu County, which was soon promoted to Marquis. In October or September that same year, he followed Gao Huan in defeating the rebel Yang Kan at Xiaqiu (瑕丘; in modern Jining, Shandong). In March or April 529, he accompanied Yuan Tianmu in his campaign against another rebel, Xing Gao at Jinan. Shaozong was successively promoted to the office of Inspector of Bing province before eventually serving as Chief Clerk under Erzhu Rong’s nephew, Erzhu Zhao.

During his time under Erzhu Rong, Shaozong met his fellow general, Hou Jing and taught him the Art of War. Over time, however, he found himself turning to Hou Jing for his opinion on tactical matters.

== Service under Erzhu Zhao ==
=== Warnings against trusting Gao Huan ===
In the new year of 531, after executing Emperor Xiaozhuang of Wei for his assassination of Erzhu Rong, Erzhu Zhao came under attack by the general, Gedouling Bufan at Jinyang. Gao Huan asked to be given command over the Xianbei of the Six Garrisons to defeat Bufan, but Murong Shaozong objected, stating, “The world is now in turmoil and the people coveting. This is the time when wise men devise their strategies. Gao of Jinzhou (Gao Huan) is a man of great talent and bravery, his deeds equal to none. Much like a dragon, how can we use him to bring clouds and rain?” However, Erzhu Zhao held Gao Huan in high regard and had Shaozong imprisoned for a few days for his remark. He then granted Gao Huan his Xianbei troops, and together they vanquished Gedouling Bufan.

Soon after, a famine broke out in the Shanxi region where Jinyang was located, so Gao Huan requested that he and his army be dispatched east of the Taihang Mountains to scour for food. Murong Shaozong once again opposed him, but Erzhu Zhao remained grateful to Gao Huan and refused to heed his warnings. Meanwhile, Gao Huan sent bribes to Erzhu Zhao’s subordinates and had them falsely accuse Shaozong of having a grudge against him. Believing that Shaozong was deliberately undermining their relationship, Erzhu Zhao had him imprisoned again and urged Gao Huan to set off for the east.

However, not long after he departed, Erzhu Zhao then received news that his aunt, Princess Beixiang, was robbed off her 300 horses by Gao Huan while she was travelling from Luoyang to Jinyang. He then released Murong Shaozong from prison and sought his advice, to which he asserted that Gao Huan was still within his reach. Erzhu Zhao gave chase with his army and managed to catch up with Gao Huan, but in the end, he was tricked into turning back to Jinyang.

=== War with Gao Huan ===
In June or July 531, Gao Huan took up arms in Xindu against the Erzhu clan. Erzhu Zhao appointed Murong Shaozhong as a Branch Censorate and ordered him to lead troops into Huguan to oppose Gao Huan. After suffering decisive defeats at Guang’a in 531 and Hanling in 532, Erzhu Zhao blamed himself and expressed his regrets to Shaozong for not following his advice. Many of Erzhu Zhao's soldiers fled following the loss at Hanling, sending him into panic as he prepared to flee alone in secret. Before he could do so, Shaozong raised the flags and sounded the horns to gather the scattered soldiers. Once the army was reorganized, Shaozong and Erzhu Zhao slowly mounted their horses and retreated westward.

In spring 533, Gao Huan launched a surprise attack on Erzhu Zhao's base in Xiurong (秀容, in modern Shuozhou, Shanxi), forcing him to flee before eventually committing suicide. Shaozong went to the city of Wutu to defend himself, but as Gao Huan's forces approached, he surrendered with Princess Beixiang, Erzhu Rong's children and Erzhu Zhao's subordinates. Gao Huan valued his talents and allowed him to retain his offices.

== Service under Gao Huan ==
In 534, Gao Huan placed Emperor Xiaojing on the throne and moved the capital to Ye, thereby founding the Eastern Wei as the Western Wei was established by Yuwen Tai and Emperor Xiaowu in the Guanzhong region. He controlled the imperial court remotely from Jinyang, while Murong Shaozong and Gao Longzhi were left in Ye to handle government treasury and books. Occasionally, Shaozong was also allowed to participate in Gao Huan's military discussions.

In 535, Murong Shaozong was ordered by Gao Huan to lead Kudi Sheng (厍狄盛) and others in defeating the rebel and native of Yiyang commandery, Li Yansun, who was aligned with the Western Wei. When he returned from the campaign, he became the acting Inspector of Yang province, and soon the acting Inspector of Qing province. (According to the Book of Zhou, Li Yansun dealt Shaozong and his forces a great defeat. He continued to harass the Eastern Wei border before he was assassinated by a subordinate in 538.)

Qing province was once home to the Southern Yan dynasty, ruled by a branch of the Murong family. During Shaozong’s tenure in Qing, one of Gao Huan’s secretaries, Sun Qian (孫搴), recommended his own brother to be appointed as a registrar in the province, but Shaozong rejected him. Sun Qian slandered him to Gao Huan, stating that Shaozong once climbed Guanggu (廣固, in modern Qingzhou, Shandong), the former capital of the Southern Yan, and sorrowfully told his confidants “Is it not the right of a real man to restore the legacy of his ancestors?” Believing the allegations, Gao Huan recalled Shaozong back to Ye.

In 537, the Western Wei general, Dugu Xin occupied Luo province, causing bandits and rebels to spring up between the provinces of Liang and Ying. While Gao Huan and the main force engaged the Western Wei at the Battle of Shayuan, Shaozong had been ordered to lead his army to Hulao Pass together with Liu Gui and others to quell the dissidents in two provinces. For his successful effort, his peerage was elevated to Duke and he was later promoted to Minister of Revenue. He then went on to serve as Inspector of Jin province and Grand Branch Censorate. When he returned to the court, he was appointed Lieutenant of the Imperial Censor.

In 544, Liu Wuhei (劉烏黑), a native of the Liang dynasty, launched and rebellion invaded Xu province. Gao Huan dispatched Shaozong as Branch Censorate to lead a counterattack on Wuhei, and after the campaign, he was appointed Inspector of Xu province. Wuhui regathered his followers and invaded Xu again, but Shaozong began contacting his subordinates to entice them into defection. Within a few months, Wuhui’s subordinates captured him alive and executed him.

== Hou Jing's rebellion against Eastern Wei ==
=== Aftermath of Gao Huan's death ===
In 546, as Gao Huan was deathly ill in Jinyang, he summoned his eldest son, Gao Cheng to discuss matters after his death. Gao Cheng was particularly worried about Hou Jing, who held semi-autonomous control over the Eastern Wei's territory in the Henan region for the past 14 years. In regards to Hou Jing, Gao Huan advised his son, “The only person who can rival Hou Jing is Murong Shaozong. I had purposely set him side and leave him to you. Treat him with great courtesy and entrust him with managing affairs.”

In early 547, Hou Jing launched his rebellion against the Eastern Wei, offering the Henan region to the Western Wei and Liang. In June, Gao Cheng appointed Shaozong as Left Supervisor of the Masters of Writing while he considered sending Pan Le to quell the rebellion. His close advisor, Chen Yuankang, warned him that Pan Le was slow to adapt to changes and reminded him about Gao Huan’s advice regarding Shaozong. Gao Cheng was hesitant at first, as Shaozong was still in Xu province and did not want to startle him into rebelling by suddenly summoning him back, but Yuankang assured him by telling him, “Shaozong knew I have been receiving preferential treatment, so he recently sent me an envoy with money as a token of sincerity. Wanting to appease him, I accepted it and replied to him with a generous letter. I guarantee there will be no confusion.”

=== Repelling the Liang army ===
On 19 November 547, Murong Shaozong was appointed Grand Branch Censorate of the Southeastern Circuits and bestowed the title of Duke of Yan. He then led Han Gui and others to camp at Xiaqiu and plan out their attack. At the time, Emperor Wu of Liang sent 100,000 soldiers under Xiao Yuanming and others to garrison at Hanshan (寒山; in present-day Xuzhou, Jiangsu) in preparation of carrying out a pincer attack with Hou Jing, blocking the Si river and flooding the strategic city of Pengcheng. During the campaign, Shaozong was further granted authority as Chief Controller of the Three Xu and Two Yan provinces, and together with Gao Yue, he first went south to oppose Xiao Yuanming.

Shaozong first camped at Tuotuo Hill (橐駝峴; north of modern day Xuzhou, Jiangsu), and then on 10 December, he arrived at Hanshan and led 10,000 soldiers to attack the Inspector of Tong province, Guo Feng (郭鳳), raining down arrows onto his camp. Xiao Yuanming ordered his generals to rescue Guo Feng, but none of them dared to advance. Shaozong ordered his soldiers to feign retreat, which enticed the Liang army to chase after him. Falling into his trap, the Eastern Wei soldiers suddenly appeared and attacked the rear of the Liang forces. Xiao Yuanming and many of his generals were captured while their soldiers suffered heavy losses. Guo Feng retreated to Tong province, but as Shaozong brought his soldiers to surround him, he abandoned his city and fled on 28 December.

=== Battle of Woyang ===
With the Liang threat dealt with, Shaozong then turned to fight Hou Jing at Woyang (渦陽; in modern Bozhou, Anhui). When Hou Jing first heard that Han Gui was attacking, he mockingly said, "What good is a child who eats pig intestines?" Then, when he heard that Gao Yue was arriving, he said, "The soldiers are elite, but the general is ordinary." Hou Jing looked down on all the generals that were sent to fight him, but when he heard that Shaozong was coming, he knocked his saddle with a look of fear and said, "Who told that Xianbei whelp (Gao Cheng) to send Shaozong here? Is King Gao (Gao Huan) still alive?"

In January 548, Hou Jing brought his forces to fight Shaozong at Woyang. Hou Jing sent an envoy to Shaozong, stating, "Are you here to see off the guests or are you here to attain victory?" To which Shaozong replied, "I am here to decide the battle." Shaozong then arranged his soldiers to follow the direction of the wind while Hou Jing closed his gates to wait for the wind to stop blowing. He warned his soldiers to keep on guard as Hou Jing was cunning and had a tendency to attack from behind. Hou Jing had his soldiers equipped with short armour and short swords before ordering them to charge at the Eastern Wei army. He also specifically instructed them to lower their aim and chop at the enemies’ shin and horses’ legs. Shaozong lost the initial bout as he fell from his horse while his lieutenant, Liu Feng was injured and the Inspector of Xian province, Zhang Zunye (張遵業) was captured.

Shaozong and Liu Feng withdrew to Qiaocheng, where their subordinates, Hulü Guang and Zhang Shixian (張恃顯) chastised them for the defeat. In response, Shaozong said, "I have met many opponents, but none is as difficult as Hou. Why do you not try to engage him and see?" The two then went out to fight Hou Jing, but not before Shaozong warned them not to cross the Guo River. Hulü Guang’s horse was shot by an arrow while Zhang Shixian was captured by Hou Jing albeit soon released. When they returned to camp, Shaozong told them, "What have you seen now? Do not rebuke me."

Hou Jing fought Shaozong at Woyang for several months. When his food supply eventually ran out, his subordinate, Sima Shiyun (司馬世雲), surrendered to the Eastern Wei. On 1 February 548, Shaozong led 5,000 cavalries to attack Hou Jing’s army. Intending to flee south to the Liang, Hou Jing attempted to convince his own men into following him by saying “Gao Cheng has already killed all your families, so why worry about your wives and children? Follow me to Jiangdong and we will one day return to Ye, where I will make you all provincial inspectors.” However, Shaozong shouted from a distance, “Your families are all safe. If you return, your official positions and honour will remain.” He then let his hair loose, faced the Big Dipper and swore an oath that his words were true.

Most of Hou Jing’s men were northerners who were reluctant to go south, and soon, many of them rushed across the Guo River to surrender back to the Eastern Wei. Hou Jing was dealt a decisive defeat as he was only able to retain a handful of confidants and 800 soldiers. As he marched day and night to cross the Huai River from Xiashi (硖石; in modern day Shanzhou, Henan), Shaozong's forces followed him behind from a distance. In the end, Hou Jing sent an envoy to Shaozong stating, “If Hou Jing is captured, what use will you be?” Thus, Shaozong stopped his pursuit and allowed him to flee to the Liang.

== Battle of Yingchuan and death ==
After returning victorious, Shaozong was awarded the title of Viscount of Yongle County. On 19 September 548, he was appointed Grand Branch Censorate and ordered to lead 100,000 troops with Gao Yue, Han Gui and Liu Feng against the Western Wei general, Wang Sizheng at Yingchuan Commandery. They besieged Sizheng at the city of Changshe (長社; in present-day Changge, Henan), during which they built a dam on the Wei River (洧水) to raise the water levels and flood the city, but he continued to put up a strong defence.

By April or May 549, the city of Changshe was on the verge of falling. Shaozong, Liu Feng and Murong Yongzhen (慕容永珍) thus went up the Wei River dam to gauge the situation in Changshe, but when they did, a storm suddenly appeared in the northeast. They boarded a tower ship to take shelter, but the storm proved too strong and broke the ropes of the ship, causing it to drift into the foot of Changshe city. The defenders quickly attached the ship with long hooks and fired arrows onto the crew. Shaozong, realizing there was no escape, jumped into the water and drowned, while Liu Feng was shot to death. Sizheng collected their bodies and buried them with proper ceremony.

Shaozong's death by mourned deeply by his officers and soldiers. He was posthumously ordered to hold tally and appointed the Chief Controller of the Seven Provinces of the Two Qings, Two Yans, Qi, Ji and Guang as well as Prefect of the Masters of Writing, Grand Commandant and Inspector of Qing province. He was also given the posthumous name of Jinghui.

== Anecdotes ==
=== Premonitions of death ===
Prior to his death, a story tells that Murong Shaozong would often have dreams of his "garlic hair" (蒜发; a term for gray hair) falling out. He thought of them as a bad omen, stating, "Since I was twenty years old, I always had garlic hair. Yesterday, my garlic hair finally ran out. Based on my inference, "garlic" (蒜; suàn) rhymes with "lifespan" (算; suàn). Does this mean that my life is coming to an end?"

Shaozong also had a premonition that he would die in a water-related disaster. He thus often took baths in his warship before throwing himself into the waters, hoping to ward off the disaster. His military officer, Fang Bao (房豹) said to him, "Fate is determined by Heaven; how can it be delayed by human intervention? If you truly face disaster, then I'm afraid that no ritual can alleviate it. If this disaster doesn't exist, then what would be the point of these rituals?" Shaozong laughed and said, "I am not free from worldly sentiments, let's just leave it at that." Soon, Shaozong died of drowning.

== Sources ==
- Book of Northern Qi
- History of the Southern Dynasties
- History of the Northern Dynasties
- Zizhi Tongjian
