= Gao Huan =

Chinese general and regent (496–547)

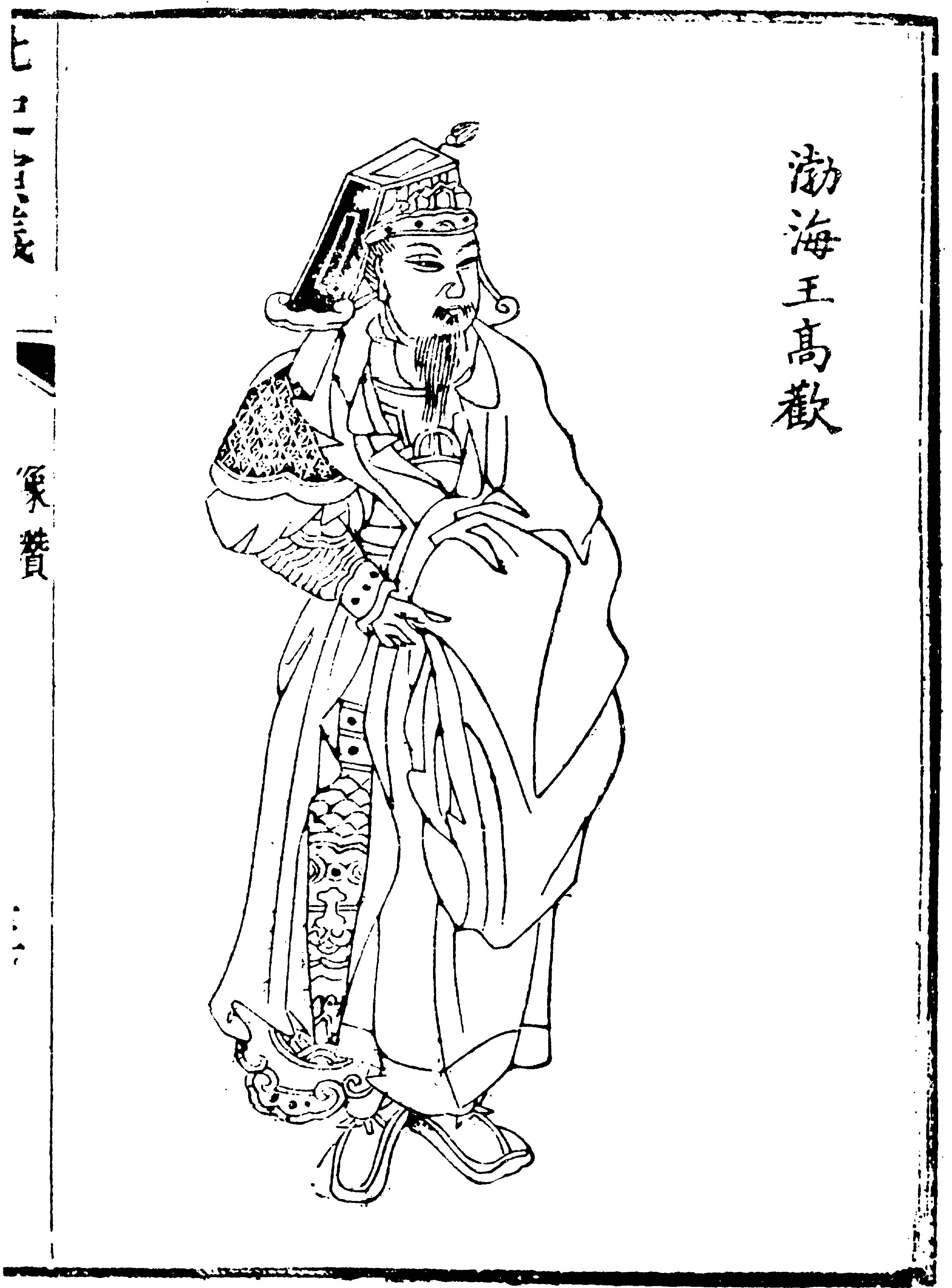

Regent of Eastern Wei
- Reign: 534-547
- Successor: Gao Cheng
- Monarch: Emperor Xiaojing
- Born: 496
- Died: 17 February 547 (aged 51)
- Consorts: Empress Wuming; Princess Ruru
- Issue: Gao Cheng; Emperor Wenxuan; Gao Jun; Gao Yan; Gao You; Emperor Xiaozhao; Gao Huan; Gao Yu; Emperor Wucheng; Gao Jie; Gao Shi; Gao Ji; Gao Ning; Gao Run; Lady Gao; Princess Taiyuan; Princess Changle Zhaoshun; Princess Yingchuan; Princess Fuyang; Princess Dongping
Posthumous name
- Emperor Shenwu 神武皇帝
Temple name
- Gaozu 高祖
- Father: Gao Shusheng
- Mother: Han Qiji

Gao Huan (simplified Chinese: 高欢; traditional Chinese: 高歡; pinyin: Gāo Huān) (496 – 13 February 547), Xianbei nickname Heliuhun (Chinese: 賀六渾), formally Prince Xianwu of Qi (Chinese: 齊獻武王), later further formally honored by Northern Qi initially as Emperor Xianwu (Chinese: 獻武皇帝), then as Emperor Shenwu (Chinese: 神武皇帝) with the temple name Gaozu (Chinese: 高祖), was a Chinese military leader who was the paramount general and a minister of the Xianbei-led Northern Wei dynasty and its branch successor state Eastern Wei dynasty.

Although he was an ethnic Han, Gao was deeply influenced by Xianbei culture and was often considered more Xianbei than Han by his contemporaries. During his career, he and his family became firmly in control of the Eastern Wei court. Eventually, in 550, his son Gao Yang forced Emperor Xiaojing of Eastern Wei to yield the throne to him, establishing the Gao clan as the imperial house of a new Northern Qi dynasty.

== Background ==
Gao Huan was born in 496, at Northern Wei's northern garrison town Huaishuo (懷朔鎮, near Guyang in modern Baotou, Inner Mongolia). He was ethnically Han, but his family, having resided at Huaishuo ever since his grandfather Gao Mi (高謐) was exiled there for faults while serving as a Northern Wei official, had largely been acculturated in the Xianbei ways. (Note: Gao Huan's nickname "Heliuhun" was a Xianbei name.) His father was Gao Shusheng (高樹生), and his mother was Han Qiji (韩期姬; Gao Shusheng's wife). His parents died soon after his birth, and he was raised at the house of his older sister Gao Loujin (高娄斤) with her husband, Wei Jing (尉景). In his young days, his family was poor, and he became a servant at the old Northern Wei capital Pingcheng (平城, in modern Datong, Shanxi). While serving at Pingcheng, Lou Zhaojun, an ethnic Xianbei and the daughter of a wealthy house, saw him and was impressed with his appearance and behavior, and she married him despite her parents' opposition. It was only after this marriage that Gao had sufficient money to buy a horse, and he became a courier for the Pingcheng defense headquarters, often delivering official mail to and from the capital Luoyang.

In 519, Gao happened to be at Luoyang when a mob of soldiers, angry over the minister Zhang Yi (張彝)'s new policy of excluding soldiers from civil service, sieged Zhang's house and then killed him. The regent Empress Dowager Hu (Emperor Xiaoming's mother) did not dare to punish them, but largely pardoned them except for eight leaders. Gao was unimpressed by Empress Dowager Hu's actions and believed that Northern Wei was on the verge of collapse. When he returned to Pingcheng, he sold his properties and used the funds to gather associates around him, stating that if disturbances occurred, the property might not be his any more anyway. His associates around this time included people from diverse ethnic backgrounds such as Xianbei, Chinese and Xiongnu, in addition to his brother-in-law Wei Jing, Sima Ziru (司馬子如), Liu Gui (劉貴), Jia Xianzhi (賈顯智), Sun Teng (孫騰), Hou Jing (侯景), and Cai Jun (蔡儁). Together they were often in the countryside, and when they saw injustices, they would seek to correct them.

In 525, in the midst of the Rebellion of the Six Frontier Towns (Chinese: 六镇之乱 (Note: The original "six frontier towns" refer to Huaishuo (怀朔), Wuchuan (武川), Fuming (抚冥), Rouxuan (柔玄), Woye (沃野) and Huaihuang (怀荒). Historian Chen Yinke is of the view that the term "liuzhen" (六镇) is a general term used to describe all the northern frontier towns in Northern Wei, but this view is not universal. The frontier towns rebelled due to many reasons; the ill-treatment of the residents in the frontier towns after the shifting of the Northern Wei capital to Luoyang was but one of them.)) against Northern Wei's rule, Gao and his associates joined one of the major Xianbei and Turkic rebel leaders, Du Luozhou (杜洛周). However, Gao soon became unimpressed with Du's behavior, and he escaped from Du's army. He then joined another rebel leader, Ge Rong, but eventually went to the Northern Wei general and Xiongnu tribal leader Erzhu Rong. By this time, Liu Gui, a Xiongnu descendant and close friend of Gao Huan was already serving under Erzhu, and he often praised Gao's talent, but when Erzhu met Gao, he was not initially impressed as Gao was poor, and looked haggard and unconfident. However, when Gao was able to tame a very wild horse, Erzhu became impressed, and they became closer and closer, with Gao pointing out that with the empire in disarray, it would be a good opportunity for Erzhu to seize power.

=== Ethnic identity ===
Gao Huan was descended from a Han Chinese family, at least paternally. He claimed the Gao clan of Bohai (渤海高氏) as his ancestors and Bohai his ancestral land, but had become de-Sinicized. The New Book of Tang traced Gao Huan's paternal ancestry to Gao Xi (高傒) who was granted the surname Gao in honour of his paternal grandfather Lü Gao (呂高). Lü Gao was a son of Duke Wen of the state of Qi whose ancestral name was Jiang (姜).

However, at the same time he maintained a very public culturally Xianbei appearance. It was recorded that he would make speech to his soldiers only in the Xianbei language instead of Chinese, unless one of his most fiercest generals - Gao Aocao was at the scene, he would then switch his use of language from Xianbei to Chinese, Gao Aocao was one of the few ethnic Chinese whom had earned respect from Gao Huan. Gao Huan was also reported as having frequently said to his soldiers in Xianbei language that the native Chinese "are your slaves," "they bring you supplies and clothing", while simultaneously telling the native Chinese that the Xianbei "are your clients" and "they fight for you and enable you to have peace and order". He had become Xianbeified as his clan had lived in Xianbei cultural region for some time after being relocated from what is now modern Hebei (Bohai). The Eastern Wei enfeoffed the land of Bohai to Gao Huan, and he became "Prince of Bohai" or "King of Bohai". Before Gao's death, he sang the "Song of the Chile" (敕勒歌; considered by many scholars as a military song for all Xianbeified soldiers) together with his trusted Chile general Hulü Jin in front of most of his major Xianbei, as well as Xianbeified Xiongnu, Chile and Chinese generals, and wept bitterly. He also pointed out that his powerful Chinese general Hou Jing was capricious, cunning and could not be trusted, who will rebel after his death, he then appointed several Xianbei and Chile generals whom he considered to be both upright and talented to be on guard of Hou Jing. In the end Hou did rebel against Gao Huan's son Gao Cheng, but the rebellion was successfully put down by Eastern Wei's senior general Murong Shaozong.

== Under the Erzhus ==
Erzhu Rong was impressed with Gao Huan's talents, and he made Gao one of his military commanders. In 528, Emperor Xiaoming, displeased at the hold on power that Empress Dowager Hu's lover Zheng Yan (鄭儼) and Zheng's associate Xu Ge (徐紇) had, entered into a conspiracy with Erzhu to have Erzhu advance on the capital to force Empress Dowager Hu to kill Zheng and Xu. Erzhu therefore began to march on the capital, and he made Gao his forward commander. On the way, however, Emperor Xiaoming ordered him to stop, but the news of the conspiracy still leaked, and Empress Dowager Hu poisoned Emperor Xiaoming to death and declared his distant toddler nephew Yuan Zhao emperor.

Erzhu refused to recognize Yuan Zhao as emperor, and he continued his march on Luoyang, declaring Yuan Ziyou the Prince of Changle emperor (as Emperor Xiaozhuang). Luoyang's defenses collapsed, and Erzhu arrested and threw Empress Dowager Hu and Yuan Zhao into the Yellow River to drown. Believing that the imperial officials would never obey him, he massacred a large number of them (including Emperor Xiaozhuang's brothers), and Emperor Xiaozhuang, fearing what would come next, offered to yield the throne to Erzhu. Gao suggested that Erzhu accept the offer, but Erzhu hesitated and ultimately ruled against it. His general Heba Yue, who opposed Erzhu's taking of the throne, suggested Erzhu that Gao should be executed to show his good faith, but Erzhu ruled against it. In fact, for Gao's contributions to the campaign, Emperor Xiaozhuang created him the Count of Tongdi.

Erzhu subsequently carried out a number of campaigns against agrarian rebels to try to reunify the empire. Gao thereafter participated in the campaigns against Ge Rong and Xing Gao, as well as the rebel general Yang Kan, serving with distinction. On one occasion, when Erzhu Rong was asking his commanders for opinions on who could succeed him as the commanding general of the army if he were no longer there, most opined that Erzhu Zhao could, but Erzhu Rong himself opined that Gao Huan was the only one capable of doing so, and he warned Erzhu Zhao, "You are no match for Gao Huan, and one day he will surely pierce through your nose." Erzhu Rong thereafter made Gao the governor of Jin Province (晉州, roughly modern Linfen, Shanxi), and while governor, Gao gathered much wealth, intending for use later.

In 530, Emperor Xiaozhuang, believing that Erzhu would eventually seize the throne, ambushed and killed him in the palace. The Erzhus, led by Erzhu Zhao and Erzhu Rong's cousin Erzhu Shilong, fought against Emperor Xiaozhuang, and Erzhu Zhao was thereafter marching on Luoyang, declaring Erzhu Rong's wife the Princess Beixiang's nephew Yuan Ye emperor. Erzhu Zhao summoned Gao to aid him, but Gao declined, using the excuse that he needed to fight against local agrarian rebels. Erzhu Zhao was displeased, but for the time being did not act against Gao. Later in the year, Erzhu Zhao captured Luoyang and arrested Emperor Xiaozhuang, delivering Emperor Xiaozhuang to his headquarters at Jinyang (晉陽, in modern Taiyuan, Shanxi). Gao wrote a letter to Erzhu Zhao urging him not to harm the emperor, but Erzhu Zhao refused to answer, and subsequently strangled Emperor Xiaozhuang to death.

Despite this, Gao remained nominally under the Erzhus' command structure, and when, around the new year, the general Gedouling Bufan (紇豆陵步番), loyal to Emperor Xiaozhuang, attacked Erzhu Zhao and initially defeated him, approaching Jinyang, Gao came to Erzhu Zhao's aid, and together they defeated and killed Gedouling. After the battle, Erzhu Zhao and Gao swore themselves to be brothers. Erzhu Zhao, trusting Gao, commissioned him with Ge Rong's former troops (largely Xianbei) and, accepting his suggestion, allowed him to take his new troops east of the Taihang Mountains to seek food.

In spring 531, Gao Huan was posturing to attack his distant relative Gao Gan (高乾), who had declared a rebellion at Xindu (信都, in modern Hengshui, Hebei), against the Erzhus. However, Gao Gan and Li Yuanzhong (李元忠) were able to persuade him that the Erzhus, because of their corruption, were hated by the people, and he could overthrow them. Gao Huan thereafter stirred his troops by forging orders from Erzhu Zhao that indicated that Erzhu Zhao was about to turn them into servants for his own troops. Gao Huan's troops believed the forged orders, and when he declared a rebellion in summer 531, they supported him.

== Rebellion against the Erzhus ==
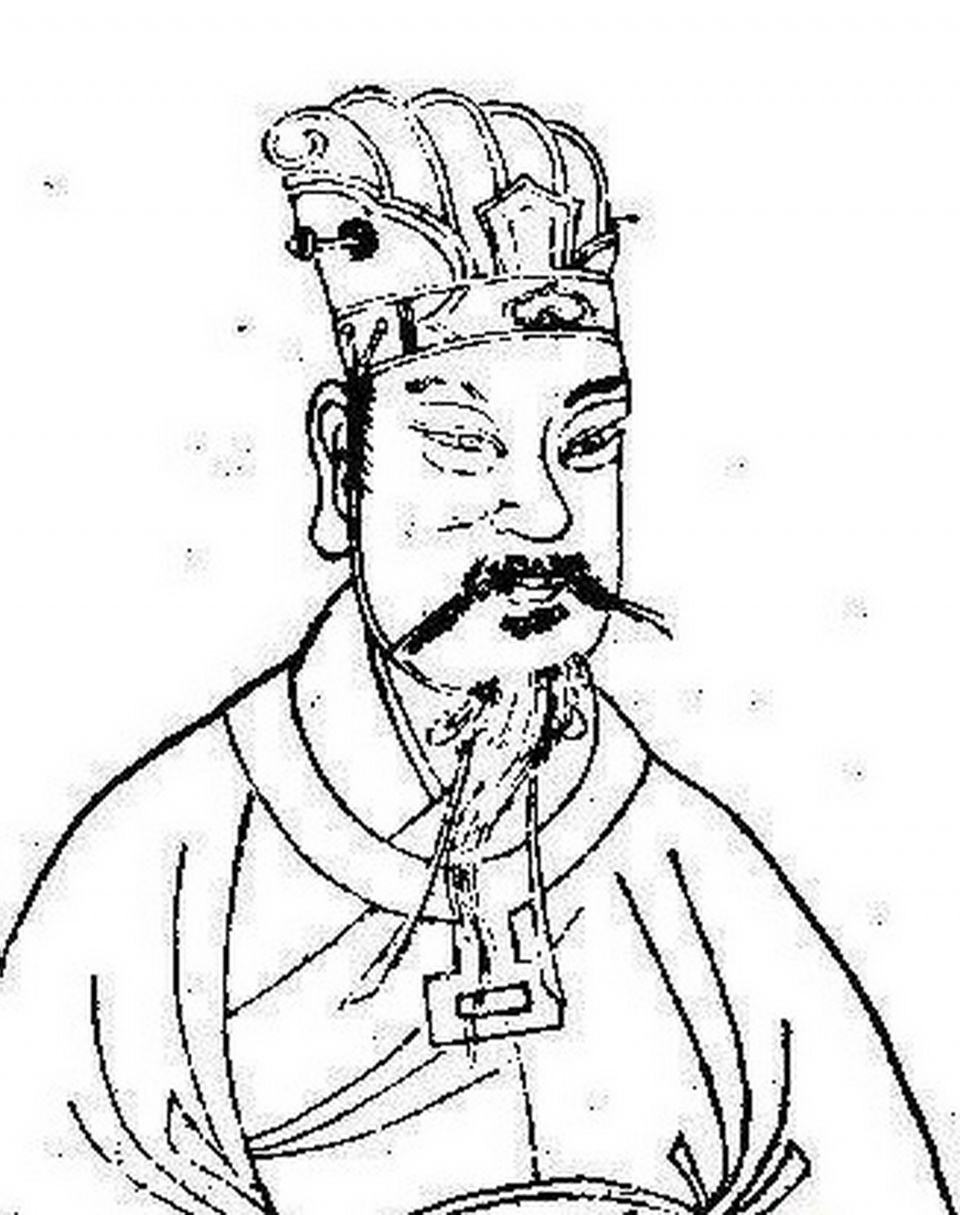
Gao Huan

Initially, Gao Huan's rebellion formally continued to recognize Emperor Jiemin, whom Erzhu Shilong had made emperor in spring 531 to replace Yuan Ye (whose distant imperial lineage made him appear inappropriate as emperor). However, at Sun Teng's urging, in fall 531, Gao declared another distant member of the imperial Yuan clan, Yuan Lang, emperor.

Despite Gao's reputation for being a capable soldier, his army was still weak, and initially, most key members of the Erzhu clan did not take him seriously, except Erzhu Shilong. Soon, Erzhu Shilong's brother Erzhu Zhongyuan and another cousin Erzhu Dulü, as well as Erzhu Zhao, converged against Gao, but Gao successfully spread rumors to make the Erzhus suspicious of each other, due to existing conflicts that Erzhu Zhao and Erzhu Shilong already had, and Erzhu Zhongyuan and Erzhu Dulü subsequently withdrew. Gao then defeated Erzhu Zhao at Guang'a (廣阿, in modern Xingtai, Hebei) in winter 531, forcing Erzhu Zhao to withdraw as well. In spring 532, Gao captured the important city Yecheng, and used it as a base for subsequent operations.

The Erzhus soon reconciled, and soon, Erzhu Zhao, Erzhu Zhongyuan, Erzhu Dulü, and Erzhu Tianguang converged on Yecheng. However, despite the Erzhus' numerical superiority, Gao defeated them at Hanling (韩陵; northeast of present-day Anyang, Henan), forcing Erzhu Zhao to flee back to Jinyang and Erzhu Zhongyuan back to his base Dong Commandery (東郡, in modern Anyang, Henan). Erzhu Tianguang and Erzhu Dulü tried to retreat to Luoyang, but at this time, the general Husi Chun rebelled against the Erzhus in Luoyang itself, killing Erzhu Shilong and another brother of Erzhu Shilong, Erzhu Yanbo (爾朱彥伯), and he also captured Erzhu Dulü and Erzhu Tianguang in battle, delivering them to Gao. Erzhu Zhongyuan soon abandoned Dong Commandery and fled to rival Liang Dynasty, leaving Erzhu Zhao as the only major surviving member of the Erzhu clan. Gao marched toward Luoyang, then controlled by Husi, with Yuan Lang.

However, Gao was beginning to believe that Yuan Lang, due to his lineage's being distant from recent emperors, to be an inappropriate choice to be emperor as well. He toyed with the idea of allowing Emperor Jiemin to remain emperor, but decided against it after his generals Wei Lan'gen (魏蘭根) and Cui Ling (name not in Unicode) advised him that Emperor Jiemin would be difficult to control in the future. He also considered Emperor Xiaowen's son Yuan Yue (元悅) the Prince of Huai'nan, and he welcomed Yuan Yue back from Liang, but he subsequently heard that Yuan Yue was arbitrary in his actions, and so decided against it as well. Instead, he offered the throne to Emperor Xiaowen's grandson Yuan Xiu the Prince of Pingyang, and Yuan Xiu accepted, taking the throne as Emperor Xiaowu. Gao became the paramount general of the empire, although the imperial government became largely run by Husi Chun and Emperor Xiaowu's associate Wang Sizheng.

== During Emperor Xiaowu's reign ==
Emperor Xiaowu initially deferred to Gao Huan, who continued to command the largest army of the state and took over Erzhu Rong's old headquarters at Jinyang as his own, on most decisions, and Emperor Xiaowu married Gao's daughter as his empress in late 532. He also created Gao the Prince of Bohai, a title that Yuan Lang had initially created Gao in 531 but Gao continuously declined until winter 533. However, the relationship between Emperor Xiaowu and Gao soon deteriorated, over Emperor Xiaowu's suspicions that Gao had designs on the throne, and over Emperor Xiaowu's desires to reassert imperial authority. Emperor Xiaowu therefore tried to align himself with independent generals, the brothers Heba Yue, who controlled the western provinces, and Heba Sheng, who controlled the southern provinces. Gao tried to remain deferential to Emperor Xiaowu outwardly, but was becoming increasingly displeased with the emperor's independence.

Gao tried to undermine Emperor Xiaowu's allies. In winter 533, he sent his associate Zhai Song (翟嵩) to persuade Heba Yue's lieutenant Houmochen Yue to betray Heba, while in spring 534 ambushing a major tribal leader, Gedouling Yili (紇豆陵依利), whom Emperor Xiaowu had also made overtures to, taking over Gedouling's troops. Soon thereafter, Homouchen assassinated Heba Yue, but Homouchen missed an opportunity to take over Heba Yue's troops. Subsequently, those troops supported Heba Yue's assistant Yuwen Tai as their leader, and Yuwen soon defeated Houmochen, who committed suicide. Emperor Xiaowu subsequently entered into an alliance with Yuwen. When Gao tried to make overtures to Yuwen, Yuwen arrested his messengers and delivered them to Emperor Xiaowu.

Emperor Xiaowu soon prepared a campaign against Gao, and he, trying to catch Gao by surprise, issued a secret edict to Gao claiming to be actually planning to attack Yuwen and Heba Sheng. Gao, however, saw through Emperor Xiaowu's plot, and marched toward Luoyang. Wang Sizheng, believing that the imperial troops were not strong enough to resist Gao's, suggested Emperor Xiaowu to flee to Yuwen's territory, and Emperor Xiaowu decided to do so, rejecting Husi Chun's offer to take one final stand at Luoyang, particularly when Heba Sheng failed to come to the emperor's aid and when Yuwen's troops failed to arrive quickly. It took Gao only a month to reach Luoyang, and Emperor Xiaowu fled west, encountering Yuwen's troops on the way, and had them escort him back to Yuwen's headquarters at Chang'an, where he reestablished the imperial government and made Yuwen prime minister.

Meanwhile, Gao Huan took over the Luoyang region, and soon also defeated Heba Sheng, taking over his territory and forcing him to flee to Liang. Gao then wrote repeated petitions to Emperor Xiaowu, requesting that he return to Luoyang and indicating that he was willing to return to the status quo ante. Emperor Xiaowu did not respond to any of Gao's overtures. Gao therefore made Yuan Shanjian, the son and heir apparent of Emperor Xiaowu's cousin Yuan Dan (元亶) the Prince of Qinghe emperor (as Emperor Xiaojing) and moving the capital from Luoyang to Yecheng, thus formally dividing the empire into two (Eastern Wei under Emperor Xiaojing and Western Wei under Emperor Xiaowu), albeit with each claiming to be the rightful one.

== During Emperor Xiaojing's reign ==
Eastern Wei's territorial size and military strength was far stronger than Western Wei's, and Gao made a number of attempts to try to end the division by conquering Western Wei, but the battles largely proved to be inconclusive, allowing Western Wei to stand. Periodically, Western Wei generals who had prior relationships with Gao would defect to Eastern Wei, and Gao at times carried out campaigns deep within Western Wei territory. However, Western Wei was able to portray Gao as a renegade general who expelled the emperor, and often during campaigns, local populace would assist Western Wei troops because they believed Western Wei's characterization. During this period, Gao also tried to foster harmony between the ethnic Xianbei and Chinese, persuading the Xianbei that they needed the Chinese to practice agriculture to be fed, and persuading the Chinese that they needed the Xianbei's military aptitude to protect them. He saw Emperor Xiaowu's flight as a blot on his personal history, so he treated Emperor Xiaojing with great formal respect, deferring to Emperor Xiaojing in all public occasions.

in spring 535, Gao Huan learned that around the new year 535, Emperor Xiaowu, who had a falling out with Yuwen Tai over Yuwen's refusal to condone his incestuous relationships with his cousins, had been poisoned to death by Yuwen. Gao suggested that an official mourning period be held for Emperor Xiaowu, and while there were disagreements, eventually a mourning period was held.

Also in spring 535, a sex scandal affected Gao's household. Gao's heir apparent Gao Cheng, born of his wife Princess Lou, had an affair with Gao Huan's concubine Zheng Dache (鄭大車), and the affair was discovered. Gao Huan caned Gao Cheng and put him under house arrest, and refused to meet with Gao Cheng's mother Princess Lou. He also considered replacing Gao Cheng as heir apparent with Gao You (高浟), the son of his concubine Erzhu Ying'e, the daughter of Erzhu Rong who had previously been Emperor Xiaozhuang's empress. After intercession by Gao Huan's friend Sima Ziru, who reminded him how much Princess Lou had done for him before he had accomplished great things and who used violent methods to force the servant girls who were witnesses to the affair to recant, Gao Huan calmed down and did not replace Gao Cheng.

Around the new year 536, Gao Huan tried to make an alliance with Rouran against Western Wei, by marrying a princess to Rouran's Chiliantoubingdoufa Khan Yujiulü Anagui. However, Yujiulü Anagui soon took a Western Wei princess as consort as well, and the alliance did not materialize.

In spring 536, Gao made a deep incursion into Western Wei territory, capturing Xia Province (夏州, roughly modern Yulin, Shaanxi), while also rescuing his ally Cao Ni (曹泥) the governor of Ling Province (靈州, roughly modern Yinchuan, Ningxia), who had been trapped behind Western Wei lines. The Western Wei general Moqi Pu (万俟普), his son Moqi Shouluogan (万俟受洛干), and other generals Chigan Baole (叱干寶樂) and Poliuhan Chang (破六韓常), who were stationed in the western Western Wei territory, also joined Gao and returned to Eastern Wei with him.

Also in spring 536, Gao Huan, at Gao Cheng's request, made Gao Cheng the Eastern Wei prime minister, despite the fact that Gao Cheng was only 14 at this point. Gao Cheng was sent to Yecheng, and he took over actual reign of the Eastern Wei imperial government.

The Volcanic winter of 536 had led to famine in the Guanzhong region that year; Easterrn Wei also suffered from the volcanic winter, with hailstorms and drought across multiple commanderies in autumn 536. In spring 537, Gao Huan launched a major attack three-pronged on Western Wei, commanded by himself and his key generals Dou Tai and Gao Aocao, intending to draw Yuwen's troops to himself while having Dou advance deep into Western Wei territory. Yuwen, pretending to be ready to abandon Chang'an to withdraw to modern eastern Gansu, instead launched a surprise attack on Dou's troops, slaughtering most of them. Dou committed suicide. Gao Huan and Gao Aocao were forced to withdraw. In counterattacks, Western Wei took modern western Henan and southwestern Shanxi.

In winter 537, after hearing news that the Guanzhong region, the heart of the Western Wei state, was suffering from a major famine, (Note: According to Zizhi Tongjian, the famine started from the previous year.) Gao Huan launched another major attack on Western Wei. He encountered Yuwen at the Battle of Shayuan (沙苑, in modern Weinan, Shaanxi), and, believing that he had overwhelming numerical advantage, rejected the strategy of Hulü Qiangju (斛律羌舉) to bypass Yuwen and make a direct attack on Chang'an, and his own initial inclination to set fire to the grass fields at Shayuan to have it burn Yuwen's troops, instead directly engaging Yuwen in battle. Yuwen's troops, however, fought hard, one of Yuwen's key generals Li Bi, led about 600 elite cavalry, charged through Gao's 200,000 soldiers and broke their formation. They defeated Gao's troops, forcing Gao to withdraw. In light of his defeat, the southern provinces and Luoyang area largely rebelled and declared allegiance to Western Wei, but in spring 538 Gao sent Hou Jing against the southern provinces, recapturing them.

In 538, after Emperor Wen of Western Wei married Yujiulü Anagui's daughter as his empress, Yujiulü Anagui cut off relations between Rouran and Eastern Wei.

In fall 538, Gao Huan, assisted by Hou Jing and Gao Aocao, put Luoyang under siege. Yuwen and Emperor Wen led the Western Wei troops to aid Luoyang's defender, the general Dugu Xin, and a largely inconclusive battle with heavy losses on both sides occurred—with Western Wei being able to kill Gao Aocao, and Yuwen nearly killed in the battle as well. However, eventually Western Wei troops were forced to abandon Luoyang and withdraw, and at the same time, the Eastern Wei general Zhao Qingque (趙青雀), who had been captured by Western Wei in the Battle of Shayuan, rebelled against Western Wei at Chang'an, forcing the Western Wei officials who remained in Chang'an to escort the crown prince Yuan Qin out of Chang'an. However, Gao Huan was unable to take advantage of the disturbance that Zhao caused, and Yuwen was able to return to Chang'an to suppress Zhao's rebellion. Meanwhile, Western Wei also recaptured some of the southern provinces. For the next few years, while there continued to be border battles, no major campaigns was initiated by either Eastern Wei or Western Wei.

In summer 539, Gao Huan gave his second daughter to Emperor Xiaojing in marriage as Emperor Xiaojing's wife and empress.

In winter 541, Gao Huan had Emperor Xiaojing issue an edict standardizing measurement units for cloth, to avoid the populace's being unfairly taxed.

In winter 542, Gao Huan launched a major attack on the Western Wei border city of Yubi (玉壁, in modern Yuncheng, Shanxi), but the Western Wei defence was held successfully and Gao was forced to withdraw.

In spring 543, another sexual wrongdoing by Gao Cheng would lead to a new campaign between Eastern Wei and Western Wei. The official Gao Zhongmi (高仲密, Gao Aocao's brother), already fearful over his situation because one of Gao Cheng's major assistants, Cui Xian (崔暹), had tried to pick his faults after he divorced Cui Xian's sister, was further aggravated when Gao Cheng tried to rape his second wife, Li Changyi (李昌儀). He therefore surrendered the important garrison of Hulao (虎牢, in modern Zhengzhou, Henan) to Western Wei. Yuwen led his troops to try to come to Gao Zhongmi's aid and further again seize the entire Luoyang region, but was repelled in a major battle near Luoyang, during which both Yuwen and Gao Huan were nearly killed in battle, with Heba Sheng, then a Western Wei general, nearly killing Gao with a spear. (In retaliation, Gao Huan later had all of Heba's sons who remained in Eastern Wei territory executed.) By summer 543, the Western Wei forces had withdrawn, and the entire Luoyang region was again under Eastern Wei control.

in 544, with Gao Huan believing that four key officials who were close to him—Sun Teng, Sima Ziru, his cousin Gao Yue (高岳), and his sworn "brother" Gao Longzhi (高隆之) -- were wielding too much power, he gave the 22-year-old Gao Cheng additional authorities, and Gao Cheng increasingly asserted authorities over these officials and others. For example, once when Sun visited Gao Cheng but was acting insufficiently deferentially, Gao Cheng had his attendants throw Sun on the ground and pound him with the sword hilts. Gao Cheng also made one of his close assistants, Cui Jishu (崔季舒, Cui Xian's uncle) an assistant to Emperor Xiaojing, in order to keep a closer eye on Emperor Xiaojing. Gao Cheng soon greatly enhanced the authorities of both Cui Xian and Song Youdao (宋遊道) and charged them with the responsibilities of stamping out corruption among officials—which Gao Huan himself had been reluctant to do so. Based on Cui Xian's and Song's recommendations, Sima was arrested and reduced to commoner rank, while Yuan Tan (元坦) the Prince of Xianyang was relieved of all governmental posts.

In spring 545, Erzhu Ying'e's brother Erzhu Wenchang (爾朱文暢) and Zheng Dache's brother Zheng Zhongli (鄭仲禮), along with Ren Zhou (任冑), conspired to assassinate Gao Huan and support Erzhu Wenchang as leader, but the conspiracy was discovered, and the conspirators were put to death, along with their families. However, because of Gao Huan's favors for Erzhu Ying'e and Zheng Dache, he spared their brothers.

Lou Zhaojun supported and assisted Gao Huan when he married more women, wanting to expand his power.

In fall 545, due to an alliance between Western Wei and Rouran to attack Eastern Wei, Gao Huan sued for peace with Rouran by requesting a marriage between a daughter of Yujiulü Anagui and Gao Cheng. Yujiulü Anagui refused, stating that it would only be sufficient if Gao Huan himself married her. Gao Huan himself initially refused, but Princess Lou, Gao Cheng, and Wei Jing all persuaded him otherwise, and he married Yujiulü Anagui's daughter, referring to her as the Princess Ruru. To facilitate this marriage, Princess Lou moved out of the mansion, but Gao Huan and Princess Lou were not formally divorced.

In fall 546, Gao Huan launched another major attack on Western Wei, apparently to make one final attempt to destroy it. He put Yubi under siege, intending to attract Western Wei forces to Yubi in order to destroy it, but Western Wei did not respond. Yuwen' Chinese general in charge of defending Yubi, Wei Xiaokuan, however, defended against all kinds of siege tactics that Gao Huan tried, for 50 days, and Eastern Wei forces suffered 70,000 deaths from the battle and the illnesses. Gao Huan himself was physically and emotionally drained, and he became ill, and he was forced to withdraw. Western Wei subsequently declared that Wei had killed Gao Huan with a powerful crossbow, and Gao Huan, in order to dispel the rumor, appeared before his army to sing the "Song of the Chile" with Hulü Jin in front of his generals. As he did, he wept bitterly.

Gao's illness continued to progress once he returned to Jinyang, and he recalled Gao Cheng to Jinyang to give him final instructions. Gao Cheng became increasingly concerned that the powerful Chinese general Hou Jing, who was then defending Luoyang and in charge of the provinces south of the Yellow River, would rebel, particularly after Hou refused a recall order. Gao Huan left Gao Cheng instructions not to announce his death, gave a list of ethnic Xianbei, Xiongnu and Chile generals that he could depend on such as Shedi Gan and Hulü Jin, and orders to put Murong Shaozong -- a capable general that Gao Huan had intentionally not promoted in order to allow Gao Cheng to do so—in charge of an army against Hou. He died in spring 547, and while a false casket was buried publicly, he was buried at a secret location in Cheng'an (成安, in modern Handan, Hebei).

== Family ==
Consorts and Issue:

- Empress Wuming, of the Lou clan (武明皇后 婁氏; 501–562), personal name Zhaojun (昭君)
  - Gao Cheng, Emperor Wenxiang (文襄皇帝 高澄; 521–549), first son
  - First daughter
    - Married Yuan Xiu of Henan (河南; 510–535) in 532
    - Married Yuan Shao (Note: not to be confused with the Eastern Han warlord with a similar name. This Yuan Shao was a grandson of Yuan Xie.) of Henan, Duke of Pengcheng (河南 元韶; d. 559) in 535
  - Princess Taiyuan (太原公主), second daughter
    - Married Yuan Shanjian of Henan, Prince Zhongshan (河南; 524–552) in 539
    - Married Yang Yin (511–560) in 551
  - Gao Yang, Emperor Wenxuan (文宣皇帝 高洋; 526–559), second son
  - Gao Yan, Emperor Xiaozhao (孝昭皇帝 高演; 535–561), sixth son
  - Gao Yu, Prince Jing of Xiangcheng (襄城景王 高淯; 536–551), eighth son
  - Gao Zhan, Emperor Wucheng (武成皇帝 高湛; 538–569), ninth son
  - Gao Ji, Prince Wenjian of Boling (博陵文簡王 高濟; d. 569), 12th son
- Princess Ruru, of the Yujiulü clan (蠕蠕公主 鬱久閭氏; 530–548)
- Lady, of the Erzhu clan (爾朱氏; d. 556)
  - Gao You, Prince Jingsi of Pengcheng (彭城景思王 高浟; 533–564), fifth son
  - Gao Ning, Prince Huashan (華山王 高凝), 13th son
- Lady, of the Han clan (韓氏; 504–551), personal name Zhihui (智輝)
  - Gao Huan, Prince Gangsu of Shangdang (上黨剛肅王 高渙; 533–558), seventh son
- Lady, of the Erzhu clan (爾朱氏)
  - Gao Jie, Prince of Rencheng (任城王 高湝; 538–577), tenth son
- Lady, of the You clan (遊氏)
  - Gao Shi, Prince Kangmu of Gaoyang (高陽康穆王 高湜; 538–560), 11th son
- Lady, of the Zheng clan of Xingyang (滎陽鄭氏), personal name Dache (大車)
  - Gao Run, Prince Fengyi (馮翊王 高潤; 543–575), 14th son
- Lady, of the Wang clan (王氏)
  - Gao Jun, Prince Jianping of Yong'an (永安簡平王 高浚; d. 558), third son
- Lady, of the Mu clan (穆氏)
  - Gao Yan, Prince Jingyi of Pingyang (平陽靖翼王 高淹; 531–564), fourth son
- Lady, of the Feng clan (馮氏)
  - Gao Qia, Prince Jinghuai of Hanyang (漢陽敬懷王 高洽; 542–554), 15th son
  - Princess Fuyang (浮陽公主)
- Unknown
  - Princess Zhaoshun of Changle (長樂昭順公主; 525–557), personal name Zheng (徵), third daughter
    - Married Liu Honghui, Prince Pingliang(劉洪徽) in 533
  - Princess Yingchuan (潁川公主)
    - Married Duan Yi of Wuwei, Prince of Pingyuan (武威 段懿)
  - Princess Dongping (東平公主)
    - Married Kezhuhun Tianhe, Duke of Boling (可朱渾 天和; d. 560)
  - Princess Donghai, personal name Naye (那耶)，who married Sima Xiaonan of Henei (河內 司馬消難)
