= Dou Tai =

Eastern Wei general (500–537)

- 竇泰

Lieutenant of the Imperial Censor (御史中尉)
- In office ?–537
- Monarch: Emperor Xiaojing of Eastern Wei

Personal details
- Born: 500 Shouyang County, Shanxi
- Died: 12 February 537 Tongguan County, Shaanxi
- Spouse: Lou Heinü
- Relations: Lou Zhaojun (sister-in-law)
- Children: Dou Xiaojing
- Parent: Dou Le (father)
- Courtesy name: Ningshi (寧世)
- Peerage: Founding Duke of Guang'a County (廣阿縣開國公)
- Posthumous name: Wuzhen (武貞)

Dou Tai (500 – 12 February 537), courtesy name Ningshi, was a military general of the Northern Wei and Eastern Wei during the Northern and Southern dynasties period. He initially served under Erzhu Rong before joining the military staff of Gao Huan, whose wife Lou Zhaojun was his sister-in-law. During the campaign against the Erzhu clan, Dou Tai played a crucial role in the Battle of Guang'a and later destroyed Erzhu Zhao's forces at Chihong Ridge (赤洪嶺; in present-day Lishi District, Shanxi). However, he was better known for the Battle of Xiaoguan, in which he was forced to commit suicide after his army was destroyed by Yuwen Tai, dealing the Eastern Wei their first major defeat to the rival Western Wei.

== Background ==
Dou Tai was a Xianbei from Hanshu County (捍殊縣), Da'an Commandery (大安郡; in present-day Shouyang County, Shanxi). His great-grandfather, Dou Luo (竇羅), was assigned as the commander of the Tongwan garrison, so his family resettled in the northern border. Growing up, Dou Tai became skilled at horseriding and archery, and was described as brave and full of strategy.

According to the Book of Northern Qi, before he was born, Dou Tai's mother had a dream of a sudden thunderstorm with signs of rain, and that she went to the courtyard to watch. Seeing lightning, thunder and raindrops, she then woke up in a cold sweat and found that she was pregnant. When it was time to give birth, she had difficulties delivering the baby and became afraid. A witch said, "If you wet your skirt while crossing the river, you will have an easy birth." She followed her advice and went to the river and saw a man, who told her, "You will give birth to a son, but you must move to the south." Dou Tai's mother obliged, and she soon gave birth to him.

== Service under Northern Wei ==
=== Rebellion of the Six Garrisons ===
When the revolt of the Six Garrisons broke out, Dou Tai's father, Dou Le (竇樂) and his brother were killed while fighting under the commander of Huaishuo garrison, Yang Jun (楊鈞) against Poliuhan Baling. Dou Tai carried their remains and went to join the Wei commander, Erzhu Rong, who made him a general. He rose to the rank of General of Xiangwei and Chief Controller of the Imperial Guard. In 528, Dou Tai followed Erzhu Rong to Luoyang during the Heyin Incident, and he was later promoted to General of the Tiger Guards and Chief Controller of the Vanguard.

After Erzhu Rong installed Emperor Xiaozhuang to the throne, Dou Tai was awarded the office of Colonel of Trainee Archers and Counsellor Remonstrant for his contributions in decision-making. In 529, he followed Erzhu Rong in his campaign against the rebel, Xing Gao in the Shandong region. His merits in the campaign earned him the rank of General Who Assists the State and General of Valiant Cavalry. He was also enfeoffed the Founding Viscount of Guang'a County.

In 530, the general, Gao Huan was appointed the Inspector of Jin province. Gao Huan requested to the court to transfer Dou Tai under his command to govern the provincial capital and discuss military affairs. The imperial court agreed and Dou Tai became Gao Huan's general.

=== Campaign against the Erzhu clan ===
In October 531, Gao Huan rebelled against the Erzhu clan in Xindu and acclaimed Yuan Lang as the new emperor of Wei. To quell his uprising, Erzhu Dulü and Erzhu Zhongyuan brought their armies to Yangping (陽平; in present-day Qingfeng County, Henan), where they were joined by Erzhu Zhao, while Erzhu Shilong stayed behind in Luoyang. Though they were cousins, there was known animosity between Zhao and Shilong. As Zhongyuan was Shilong's brother and Dulü was a close ally of Shilong, Dou Tai proposed to Gao Huan a strategy of sowing discord among the Erzhus. They spread a rumour within the enemy camps that Shilong and his brothers were planning to attack Zhao, along with another rumour that Zhao was colluding with Gao Huan to kill Shilong. The plan was a success, as both Dulü and Zhongyuan left in fear without a fight, allowing Gao Huan to defeat Erzhu Zhao on his own at the Battle of Guang'a.

In 532, Gao Huan decisively defeated the Erzhu clan at the Battle of Hanling, scattering their forces. He installed Emperor Xiaowu to the throne, who elevated Dou Tai's peerage to the Founding Duke of Guang'a County and promoted him to Foundational General and Minister of Palace with Equal Rank to the Three Excellencies. He was also appointed Inspector of Xiang province.

In the aftermath of Hanling, Erzhu Zhao managed to flee and form a new base at Xiurong (秀容, in modern Shuozhou, Shanxi), dividing his forces to guard the strategic passes and often sending his troops out to conduct raids. On four occasions, Gao Huan publicly announced his intention to campaign against Erzhu Zhao, but he never follow up on his threats. Seeing that Gao Huan was merely bluffing, Erzhu Zhao relaxed his vigilance. As the new year approached, Gao Huan predicted that Erzhu Zhao would be hosting a feast, so he sent Dou Tai with elite cavalry to attack Xiurong. Dou Tai travelled over 300 miles in one day and one night, and Gao Huan later followed him from behind. In 533, Dou Tai secretly entered Erzhu Zhao's courtyard. The enemy soldiers were too fatigued and intoxicated from the eating and drinking, and when they saw Dou Tai's men, they all panicked and fled. Dou Tai's forces chased after them to Chihong Ridge and routed them, causing Erzhu Zhao to kill himself.

For his achievements at Chihong Ridge, Dou Tai was promoted to General Who Pacifies the Army, Household Counsellor with Silver Seal and Blue Tassel and Palace Attendant. He was later appointed General of the Chariots and Cavalry Inspector of Xian province and then Inspector of Wei province.

=== Campaign against Emperor Xiaowu ===
In 534, as conflict broke out between him and Gao Huan, Emperor Xiaowu sent his generals Jia Xianzhi (賈顯智) and Husi Yuanshou (斛斯元壽) to pacify Huatai (滑台, in modern Anyang, Henan). In response, Gao Huan sent Dou Tai and another general, Moduolou Daiwen to Huatai as well. Dou and Jia's forces met at Changshoujin (長壽津; in present-day Puyang, Henan), where Jia secretly negotiated his surrender and withdrew his soldiers. When the commander, Yuan Xuan (元玄) saw that they were withdrawing, he promptly fled back to the emperor and requested for reinforcements. Xiaowu sent the Grand Chief Controller, Hou Yishao (侯鰤紹) to fight them. They fought east of Huatai, where Jia surrendered to Dou with his troops and Hou Yishao was killed in battle.

== Service under Eastern Wei ==
Emperor Xiaowu managed to escape by fleeing westward to join the general, Yuwen Tai in the Guanzhong region. Gao Huan then installed Emperor Xiaojing to the throne, founding the Eastern Wei while Yuwen Tai led the Western Wei. Following Xiaojing's ascension, Dou Tai was appointed Palace Attendant, Grand Chief Controller of the Capital Region and Minister of Palace with Equal Rank to the Three Excellencies while retaining his other duties.

Dou Tai was married to Lou Heinü (婁黑女), who was the younger sister of Gao Huan's wife, Lou Zhaojun. As a distinguished official and noble relative, he was made Lieutenant of the Imperial Censor. Though Dou Tai was valued for his kinship, he also attained his achievements and reputations through his own abilities. There were little complaints about his work, but many of the officials also feared him.

In 535, Dou Tai followed Sima Ziru and Han Gui to attack Tongguan. When Yuwen Tai led his troops to Bashang (霸上; near present-day Xi'an, Shaanxi), Sima withdrew to Puban (蒲阪, in modern Yuncheng, Shanxi), crossed the Yellow River at night and launched a surprise attack on Hua province (華州, roughly modern Weinan, Shaanxi), but was defeated by the Western Wei general, Wang Pi. Later that year, Dou was given 30,000 soldiers and ordered to resist the Liang general, Yuan Qinghe at Chengfu (城父, in present-day Bozhou, Anhui). Yuan moved to invade Nandun (南頓; around present-day Xiangcheng City, Henan), where he was defeated by Yao Xiong.

=== Battle of Xiaoguan and death ===
In late 536, Gao Huan launched a three-prong invasion of Western Wei and tasked Dou Tai with attacking Tongguan. According to the Book of Northern Qi, when Dou was about to leave the capital, Ye for the campaign, a nun named Huihua (惠化) spread a saying, "Branch Censorate Dou will leave and never return." Before he set off, at three in the morning, thousands of people in red clothes and hats suddenly entered the palace and declared, "We are here to arrest Lieutenant Dou." The soldiers and officials on duty were disturbed. The men in red then entered several houses and were never seen again. The next morning, the witnesses inspected the houses and realized that the men they saw last night were not human beings. They feared that disaster will befall Dou Tai.

In early 537, Dou Tai's detachment reached Xiaoguan (小關; south of Tongguan County, Shaanxi), where he was surprised by the sudden appearance of Western Wei forces under Yuwen Tai. Dou hurriedly led his troops to cross the Yellow River from Fengling (風陵; in present-day Ruicheng County, Shanxi), while Yuwen marched from Mamuze (馬牧澤; north of Tongguan County) to attack him. The result was a resounding defeat for the Eastern Wei, as Dou's entire army of around 10,000 soldiers were killed, and he was forced to commit suicide.

The defeat of Dou's regiment forced Gao Huan to issue a retreat. His armour and horse were given to the Western Wei general, Li Bi, while his head was sent to the Western Wei capital, Chang'an. In the Eastern Wei, the imperial court posthumously appointed Dou Tai as Grand Marshal, Grand Commandant and Manager of the Affairs of the Masters of Writing. He was also given the posthumous name of "Wuzhen". Following the Battle of Heqiao in 538, the Western Wei returned Dou Tai's head to the Eastern Wei. Shortly after Emperor Wenxuan of Northern Qi ascended the throne in 550, he sent people to Dou's tomb to pay tribute, and during the reign of Emperor Xiaozhao in 560, Dou's name was enshrined in Gao Huan's ancestral temple.

== Sources ==
- Book of Northern Qi
- History of the Northern Dynasties
- Zizhi Tongjian
