= Book of Northern Qi =

- Traditional Chinese: 北齊書
- Simplified Chinese: 北齐书
Transcriptions
Standard Mandarin
- Hanyu Pinyin: Běi Qí Shū
Southern Min
- Hokkien POJ: Pak Chê-su (col.); Pok Chê-su (lit.)

The Book of Northern Qi (Chinese: 北齊書; pinyin: Běi Qí Shū), is one of the Twenty-Four Histories and covers the Northern Qi Dynasty. It was written by the Tang dynasty historian Li Baiyao (李百藥) and was completed in 636. It is listed among the official Twenty-Four Histories of China. The original book contained 50 chapters but it was found during the Song dynasty that only 17 chapters were intact. The rest are lost.

== Contents ==
=== Annals (紀) ===
#	Title	Translation	Notes
Volume 1	帝紀第1 神武帝上	Emperor Shenwu	
Volume 2	帝紀第2 神武帝下	Emperor Shenwu	
Volume 3	帝紀第3 文襄帝	Emperor Wenxiang	
Volume 4	帝紀第4 文宣帝	Emperor Wenxuan	
Volume 5	帝紀第5 廢帝	Emperor Fei	
Volume 6	帝紀第6 孝昭帝	Emperor Xiaozhao	
Volume 7	帝紀第7 武成帝	Emperor Wucheng	
Volume 8	帝紀第8 後主 幼主	Houzhu; Youzhu	

=== Biographies (列傳) ===
#	Title	Translation	Notes
Volume 9	列傳第1 後宮	Empresses and Consorts	
Volume 10	列傳第2 高祖十一王	Eleven Princes of Shenwu	
Volume 11	列傳第3 文襄六王	Six Princes of Wenxiang	
Volume 12	列傳第4 文宣四王 孝昭六王 武成十二王 後主五男	Four Princes of Wenxuan; Six Princes of Xiaozhao; Twelve Princes of Wucheng; Five Princes of Houzhu	
Volume 13	列傳第5 趙郡王琛 子叡 清河王岳 子勱	Gao Chen; Gao Rui; Gao Yue; Gao Mai	
Volume 14	列傳第6 廣平公盛 陽州公永樂 弟長弼 襄樂王顯國 上洛王思宗 子元海 弟思好 平秦王歸彥 武興王普 長樂太守靈山 嗣子伏護	Gao Sheng; Gao Yongle; Gao Changbi; Gao Xianguo; Gao Sizong; Gao Yuanhai; Gao Sihao; Gao Guiyan; Gao Pu; Gao Lingshan; Gao Fuhu	
Volume 15	列傳第7 竇泰 尉景 婁昭 兄子叡 厙狄干 子士文 韓軌 潘樂	Dou Tai; Wei Jing; Lou Zhao; Lou Rui; Shedi Gan; Shedi Shiwen; Han Gui; Pan Le	
Volume 16	列傳第8 段榮 子韶	Duan Rong; Duan Shao	
Volume 17	列傳第9 斛律金 子光 羨	Hulü Jin; Hulü Guang; Hulü Xian	
Volume 18	列傳第10 孫騰 高隆之 司馬子如	Sun Teng; Gao Longzhi; Sima Ziru	
Volume 19	列傳第11 賀拔允 蔡儁 韓賢 尉長命 王懷 劉貴 任延敬 莫多婁貸文 高市貴 厙狄迴洛 厙狄盛 薛孤延 張保洛 侯莫陳相	Heba Yun; Cai Jun; Wei Zhangming; Wang Huai; Liu Gui; Ren Yanjing; Moduolou Daiwen; Gao Shigui; Shedi Huiluo; Shedi Sheng; Xuegu Yan; Zhang Baoluo; Houmochen Xiang	
Volume 20	列傳第12 張瓊 斛律羌 堯雄 宋顯 王則 慕容紹宗 薛脩義 叱列平 步大汗薩 慕容儼	Zhang Qiong; Hulü Qiang; Yao Xiong; Song Xian; Wang Ze; Murong Shaozong; Xue Xiuyi; Chilie Ping; Budahan Sa; Murong Yan	
Volume 21	列傳第13 高乾 封隆之	Gao Gan; Feng Longzhi	
Volume 22	列傳第14 李元忠 盧文偉 李義深	Li Yuanzhong	
Volume 23	列傳第15 魏蘭根 崔悛	Wei Lan'gen	
Volume 24	列傳第16 孫搴 陳元康 杜弼	Sun Qian; Chen Yuankang	
Volume 25	列傳第17 張纂 張亮 張耀 趙起 徐遠 王峻 王紘	Zhang Zuan; Zhang Liang; Zhang Yao; Zhang Qi; Xu Yuan; Wang Jun; Wang Hong	
Volume 26	列傳第18 薛琡 敬顯儁 平鑒	Xue Chu; Jing Xianjun; Ping Jian	
Volume 27	列傳第19 万俟普 劉豐 破六韓常 金祚 韋子粲	Moqi Pu; Liu Feng; Poliuhan Chang; Jin Zuo; Wei Zican	
Volume 28	列傳第20 元坦 元斌 元孝友 元暉業 元弼 元韶	Yuan Tan; Yuan Bin; Yuan Bi; Yuan Shao	
Volume 29	列傳第21 李渾 李璵 鄭述祖 子元德	Li Hun; Li Yu; Zheng Shuzu; Zi Yuande	
Volume 30	列傳第22 崔暹 高德政 崔昂	Cui Xian; Gao Dezheng; Cui Ang	
Volume 31	列傳第23 王昕 弟晞	Wang Xin; Wang Xi	
Volume 32	列傳第24 陸法和 王琳	Lu Fahe; Wang Lin	
Volume 33	列傳第25 蕭明 蕭祗 蕭退 蕭放 徐之才	Xiao Yuanming; Xiao Zhi; Xiao Tui; Xiao Fang; Xu Zhicai	
Volume 34	列傳第26 楊愔 燕子獻 宋欽道 鄭頤	Yang Yin; Yan Zixian; Song Qindao; Zheng Yi	
Volume 35	列傳第27 裴讓之 李構 張宴之 陸卬 王松年 劉禕	Pei Rangzhi; Li Guo; Zhang Yanzhi; Lu Ang; Wang Songnian; Liu Yi	
Volume 36	列傳第28 邢卲	Xing Shao	
Volume 37	列傳第29 魏收	Wei Shou	
Volume 38	列傳第30 辛術 元文遙 趙彥深	Xin Shu; Yuan Wenyao; Zhao Yanshen	
Volume 39	列傳第31 崔季舒 祖珽	Cui Jishu; Zu Ting	
Volume 40	列傳第32 尉瑾 馮子琮 赫連子悅 唐邕 白建	Yu Jin; Feng Zicong; Helian Ziyue; Tang Yong; Bai Jian	
Volume 41	列傳第33 暴顯 皮景和 鮮于世榮 綦連猛 元景安 獨孤永業 傅伏 高保寧	Bao Xian; Pi Jinghe; Xianyu Shirong; Qilian Meng; Yuan Jing'an; Dugu Yongye; Fu Fu; Gao Baoning	
Volume 42	列傳第34 陽斐 盧潛 崔劼 盧叔武 陽休之 袁聿修	Yang Fei; Lu Qian; Cui Jie; Yang Xiuzhi; Yuan Yuxiu	
Volume 43	列傳第35 李稚廉 封述 許惇 羊烈 源彪	Li Zhilian; Feng Shu; Xu Dun; Yang Lie; Yuan Biao	
Volume 44	列傳第36 儒林	Confucian Scholars	
Volume 45	列傳第37 文苑	Writers	
Volume 46	列傳第38 循吏	Good Officials	
Volume 47	列傳第39 酷吏	Cruel Officials	
Volume 48	列傳第40 外戚	Imperial Affines	
Volume 49	列傳第41 方伎	Arts	
Volume 50	列傳第42 恩倖	The Emperor's Favor	
