= Xindu Commandery =

Historic commandery of China

Xindu Commandery (Chinese: 信都郡) was a historical commandery of China, located in modern southern Hebei.

The commandery was created in early Western Han dynasty. In 155 BC, the territory was granted to Liu Pengzu (劉彭祖), son of the Emperor Jing, as the Principality of Guangchuan (廣川國). Later, Pengzu acquired the new title Prince of Zhao, and the principality was granted to Liu Yue, another son of the emperor. In 50 BC, the principality was abolished and reverted to a commandery. In 37 BC, the territory was granted to Liu Xing (劉興), son of the reigning Emperor Yuan, whose descendants held the fief until Wang Mang's usurpation. After the restoration of Eastern Han, the commandery again became known as Xindu. In 72 AD, it was granted to Liu Dang (劉黨), son of the reigning Emperor Ming as the Principality of Lecheng (樂成國). After 122 AD, it became known as the Principality of Anping (安平國). The principality was dissolved in 184 AD, and it was subsequently administered as the Anping Commandery (安平郡). In 2 AD, it administered 17 counties, namely Xindu (信都), Li (歷), Fuliu (扶柳), Piyang (辟陽), Nangong (南宮), Xiabo (下博), Wuyi (武邑), Guanjin (觀津), Gaodi (高隄), Guangchuan (廣川), Lexiang (樂鄉), Pingdi (平隄), Tao (桃), Xiliang (西梁), Changcheng (昌成), Dongchang (東昌) and Xiu (脩). The population was 304,384 or 65,556 households in 2 AD, and 655,118 (91,440 households) in 140 AD.

During early Western Jin dynasty, Anping again briefly became a principality and was granted to Sima Fu, brother of Sima Yi. Xindu County in Anping was also the capital of Ji Province. In 280 AD, the principality had a population of 21,000 households in 8 counties. Later during Jin dynasty, it became Changle Commandery (長樂郡). The commandery was abolished in early Sui dynasty.

In Sui and Tang dynasties, Xindu Commandery became the alternative name of Ji Prefecture (冀州). In 742 AD, the prefecture had 9 counties: Xindu, Nangong, Tangyang (堂陽), Zaoqiang (棗強), Wuyi (武邑), Hengshui (衡水), Fucheng (阜城), Tiao (蓚) and Wuqiang (武強). The population was 830,520, or 113,885 households.
