= Duan Shao =

Northern Wei, Eastern Wei and Northern Qi general (died 571)

- 段韶

Grand Tutor (太傅)
- In office 564–571
- Monarch: Gao Wei

Personal details
- Born: Unknown Wuwei, Gansu
- Died: 18 October 571 Handan, Hebei
- Relations: Gao Huan (uncle); Lou Zhaojun (aunt)
- Children: Duan Yi; Duan Shen; Duan Deju; Duan Deheng; Duan Dekan; Duan Decao; Duan Dexie; Duan Dejun
- Parent(s): Duan Rong (father); Lou Xinxiang (mother)
- Courtesy name: Xiaoxian (孝先)
- Nickname: Tiefa (铁伐)
- Peerage: Prince of Pingyuan Commandery (平原郡王)
- Posthumous name: Zhongwu (忠武)

Duan Shao (died 18 October 571), courtesy name Xiaoxian, Xianbei nickname Tiefa, was a military general of the Northern Wei, Eastern Wei and Northern Qi during the Northern and Southern dynasties period. A nephew of Gao Huan, he participated in several campaigns against the Erzhu clan and Western Wei, and by the establishment of the Northern Qi, he was already one of the most trusted officials of the ruling Gao family. Throughout his lengthy career, he was most known for his role in the war against the Northern Zhou, during which he led the Qi to their biggest victories at Jinyang and Mount Mang in 564.

== Background ==
Duan Shao was a native of Guzang County (姑臧縣), Wuwei Commandery (武威郡; in present-day Wuwei, Gansu) and the eldest son of Duan Rong and his wife, Lou Xinxiang (婁信相). In his youth, he was seen as a prospective general through his talents in horse riding and archery. His mother was the elder sister of Gao Huan's wife, Lou Zhaojun, thus making him their nephew. Duan Rong was one of Gao Huan's earliest followers, and Duan Shao was held in high regard by his uncle, who treated him as a close counsellor. In 528, Duan Shao received his first official position as Chief Controller of the Confidants.

== Service under Gao Huan ==
=== Campaign against the Erzhu clan ===
In 531, Gao Huan rebelled against the Erzhu clan and faced their forces led by Erzhu Zhao at the Battle of Guang'a. He was concerned by their numerical superiority, but Duan Shao assured him that despite their numbers, the Erzhus' defeat was imminent, as they already lost the goodwill of the people by committing multiple transgressions against the emperor and the gentry clans. In the end, by sowing discord among the enemy, Gao Huan managed to defeat Erzhu Zhao's forces. Soon, Duan Shao followed his uncle to attack and capture Ye from the Inspector of Xiang province, Liu Dan (劉誕).

In 532, Gao Huan fought the Erzhu clan again at the decisive Battle of Hanling. Duan Shao was among the first to charge into the enemy lines, and Gao's forces routed and scattered the Erzhu forces. In 533, he accompanied Gao Huan out of Jinyang and chased after Erzhu Zhao to Chihong Ridge (赤洪嶺; in present-day Lishi District, Shanxi), where they destroyed the last of his forces and drove him to suicide. For his contributions against the Erzhu clan, Duan was enfeoffed the Baron of Xialuo County.

=== Invasion of Xia province ===
In 534, the Northern Wei was split into two, with Gao Huan controlling the Eastern Wei and Yuwen Tai ruling the Western Wei. In 536, Duan Shao followed Gao Huan to conquer Xia province and captured the Western Wei provincial inspector, Hulü Mie'Tu (斛律彌娥突) alive. He was promoted to Prancing Dragon General and Counsellor Remonstrant, and later, to General of the Military Guards. Gao Huan also allowed Duan Rong to pass his title of Marquis of Guzang over to Duan Shao. In turn, Duan Shao gave his title of Baron of Xialuo to his step-brother, Duan Ning'an (段寧安).

=== Battle of Mount Mang (543) ===
In 543, Gao Huan led his army against the Western Wei at the Battle of Mount Mang. During the battle, the Western Wei general, Heba Sheng, managed to recognize Gao and chased after him with his elite soldiers. Duan Shao rode alongside his uncle and shot arrows at the enemy vanguard, deterring the pursuers from getting closed. Near the end of the pursuit, Heba was about to strike Gao with his spear, but Duan managed to shoot down his steed in time, allowing them to escape. The battle ultimately ended in victory for the Eastern Wei, and for his heroics, Duan Shao's peerage was elevated to the Duke of Guzang.

=== Battle of Yubi ===
In 546, Duan Shao followed Gao Huan on his final military campaign against the Western Wei at Yubi (玉壁, in modern Yuncheng, Shanxi), which ended in heavy defeat. He fell deathly ill and was forced to withdraw, and soon, he summoned his generals to discuss their next plans. He asked Hulü Jin, Han Gui and Liu Fengsheng on their opinions on assigning Duan Shao to the important task of defending the capital, Ye, which they all approved. Thus, he ordered Duan to guard Ye with his second son, Gao Yang while his eldest son, Gao Cheng left the city to meet his father. Before his death, Gao Huan advised Gao Cheng, "Duan Xiaoxian is loyal, bright and kind, possessing both wisdom and courage. Among my relatives, only he is worthy for you to consult on important military matters."

== Service under Gao Cheng ==
In 547, Gao Huan died and was succeeded by Gao Cheng. Soon after, the Eastern Wei general, Hou Jing, rebelled in the Henan and planned on surrendering the region to either the Western Wei or the Liang dynasty in the south. Gao Cheng toured to various places to appease his other subordinates and left Duan Shao to protect Jinyang and take charge of military affairs. When Gao Cheng returned to Ye, he was enfeoffed as the Duke of Changle Commandery. Later, Duan followed Murong Shaozong to quell Hou Jing's rebellion. During the campaign, they secretly set fire to the banks of the Woyang river, but Hou Jing led his cavalry to jump into river and then withdraw, wetting the grass and extinguishing the fire. In 548, Hou Jing was finally defeated and forced to flee south to the Liang dynasty.

In 549, Duan Shao was once against left in charge of Jinyang when Gao Cheng went to campaign against the Western Wei general, Wang Sizheng in Yingchuan. After Gao Cheng's return, he was given an additional fief as Baron of Zhending County and appointed Inspector of Bing province.

== Service under Emperor Wenxuan ==
=== Emperor Wenxuan's ascension ===
Later in the year, Gao Cheng was assassinated, and Gao Yang succeeded his brother. Gao Yang had ambitions to claim the throne from Emperor Xiaojing of Eastern Wei, and during the process, he asked Duan Shao to inquire Hulü Jin's opinion on the matter. In 550, Gao Yang forced Xiaojing to abdicate the throne to him, thus establishing the Northern Qi dynasty. Duan Shao was enfeoffed the Duke of Chaoling Commandery and Marquis of Bacheng County, as well as the title of Specially Advanced. However, Duan submitted a petition returning the Duke of Chaoling title and requested that his step-mother Lady Liang (梁氏), be given the commandery as a Lady. Gao Yang, posthumously Emperor Wenxuan, commended Duan's behaviour and granted his request. Duan then gave his Marquis of Bacheng title to Lady Liang's brother, Duan Xiaoyan (段孝言), which earned him praise from the public. Emperor Wenxuan also took in Duan's sister as one of his concubines.

Duan Shao was on bad terms with the Prince of Guangwu, Gao Changbi (高長弼). When Emperor Wenxuan was about to leave for Jinyang, Gao Changbi expressed his worries about Duan's command over the strong military in Jinyang and warned that he might rebel. The emperor dismissed his concerns, and when he met Duan, he told him, "Even a loyal minister like you can get slandered, let alone others!" He was later promoted to Right Supervisor of the Masters of Writing. In 552, Duan was appointed as Inspector of Ji Province and Grand Chief Controller of the Six Provinces. During his tenure, he was well-loved by his officials and people for his altruistic policies.

=== Campaigns against the Liang dynasty ===
In 553, the Liang dynasty general, Dongfang Bai'e (東方白額) infiltrated Suyu (宿預; in present-day Suqian, Jiangsu) and incited the residents of the Northern Qi's southern border to kill their local officials, causing unrest between the Huai and Si rivers. In 554, Emperor Wenxuan sent Duan Shao to suppress the rebellion. At the time, the Liang paramount general, Chen Baxian about to lead his troops to Guangling, while his general Yan Chaoda (嚴超達) was besieging Jing province (涇州; around present-day central Anhui). The Northern Qi inspector, Wang Jingbao (王敬寶) had also sent an envoy to the court for emergency assistance, as the Liang general, Yin Siling (尹思令) had gathered 10,000 soldiers to attack his city of Xuyi. When Duan Shao arrived, the three Liang armies were frightened.

Duan left his general, Yao Nanzong to defend Suyu when he led several thousand troops in a hasty march toward Jing province. As Duan passed through Xuyi, Yin Siling was surprised by their sudden arrival and promptly fled. Duan then continued his way to Jing, where he defeated Yan Chaoda and seized all his ships and equipments. Duan then turned back to Guangling, forcing Chen Baxian to retreat as well. He pursued Chen's forces all the way to Yangzizha (楊子柵; in present-day Yangzhou, Jiangsu) before withdrawing back to Suyu, seizing more military supplies and equipment along the way. At Suyu, Duan sent people to convince Dongfang to surrender, and Dongfang was open to an alliance. Once the alliance was made, however, Duan executed Dongfang and his brothers and sent their heads to Ye, thus pacifying the Jianghuai region. Emperor Wenxuan rewarded Duan Shao by elevating his fief to the Prince of Pingyuan Commandery.

In 554, the Liang capital, Jiangling was attacked by the Western Wei, so Emperor Wenxuan sent Duan Shao and the Prince of Qinghe, Gao Yue to rescue the city. However, the city fell while they were en route, so they turned back and captured Ying province along with the Liang provincial inspector, Lu Fahe (陸法和). Later that year, Duan Shao followed Gao Yue, the Prince of Changshan, Gao Yan and the Prince of Shangdang, Gao Huàn to build four cities, namely Fa'e (伐惡), Xincheng (新城), Yancheng (嚴城) and Henan (河南) in the southwest of Luoyang. They also set up Guomo garrison (郭默戍) at Xincai Commandery (新蔡郡; around present-day Gushi County, Henan) before returning to their posts.

== Service under Emperor Fei and Emperor Xiaozhao ==
In 559, Emperor Wenxuan died and was succeeded by his son, Emperor Fei. Duan Shao was later appointed the Minister of Education. The following year, Gao Yan and Grand Empress Dowager Lou Zhaojun preemptively arrested and executed the Prefect of the Masters of Writing, Yang Yin, and others, who had attempted to remove Lou from power. Duan Shao participated in the coup on the side of his aunt, entering the inner palace with Gao Yan through the Yunlong Gate (雲龍門). Afterwards, Duan was appointed the Grand General.

Months after the coup, Lou Zhaojun had Emperor Fei pass the throne over to Gao Yan, posthumously known as Emperor Xiaozhao. After ascending the throne, he appointed Duan Shao as Grand Tutor to the Crown Prince.

== Service under Emperor Wucheng ==
=== Gao Guiyan's rebellion ===
Emperor Xiaozhao's reign was short-lived, as he died and was succeeded by his brother, Emperor Wucheng in 561. Two days after his ascension, Emperor Wucheng promoted Duan Shao as Grand Marshal. In 562, he was appointed Inspector of Bing province again. That year, the Prince of Pingqin, Gao Guiyan, rebelled in Ji province. Duan and the Prince of Dong'an, Lou Rui led their forces to quell the rebellion, quickly breaking through Guiyan's city and capturing him. In the same month, Duan was promoted to Grand Preceptor, but he continued to work from Bing province. During his tenure, Duan Shao was said to have focused on upholding the main principles of governance while not paying much to minor issues, which made him greatly popular among the people.

=== Battle of Jinyang ===
In 563, the Northern Qi was invaded by an alliance of the Northern Zhou (succeeded the Western Wei in 557) and the Turkic Khaganate. The Zhou dispatched the general, Yang Zhong to lead a northern prong attack to besiege Jinyang, while Daxi Wu attacked from the south through Pingyang to help Yang. After Yang broke through the enemy defenses, he was joined by 100,000 Göktürk cavalries under and marched south towards Jinyang along three routes. The Northern Qi was in a state of crisis, and Emperor Wucheng promptly marched east with an army to oppose the invasion. He also entrusted Duan Shao with specific military command.

There was heavy snowfall around Jinyang at the time, so the Zhou had their infantry lead the vanguard and rush down a mountain west of the city. The generals of Qi wanted to engage them, but Duan Shao warned them, "The infantry's momentum is limited. Now that the snow is deep, a counterattack would not be feasible. It is better that we wait for them in formation. They will eventually tire themselves out, and while we are at ease, we will surely defeat them." The Zhou army eventually arrived at the western part of Jinyang, upon which the Qi forces marched out drums beating and attacked in full force. The Göktürk soldiers were taken by surprise and retreated back to the west mountain, refusing to fight. As a result, the Zhou suffered a heavy defeat as their vanguard was completely wiped out. The rear troops fled overnight, and with Yang Zhong retreating, the Göktürk army followed suit. Duan Shao was ordered by Emperor Wucheng to pursue the Göktürks, but he did not dare approach them, only following them to ensure they cross the border before returning.

Emperor Wucheng praised Duan Shao for his contributions at Jinyang and conferred him the additional title of Duke of Wude Commandery and later promoted him to Grand Tutor in 564. On the other hand, another general, Hulü Guang, who had been defending the southern front from Daxi Wu, was not pleased by Duan's decision not to engage with the retreating Göktürks and sarcastically remarked to the emperor, "Old Lady Duan is good at seeing off the female guests."

=== Battle of Mount Mang (564) ===
While peace negotiations were under way between Northern Zhou and Northern Qi, Duan Shao was sent with troops to the border to defend against repeated raids by the Göktürks. The paramount general of Zhou, Yuwen Hu sent a letter to Emperor Wucheng demanding the return of his mother, Lady Yan (阎姬), who had been living in Qi as part of the peace offer. The emperor sent the letter to Duan for his opinion, which he warned not to accept, as he believed that the Zhou renege on their promises. However, Wucheng decided not to follow his advice and returned Lady Yan. As soon as he received his mother, Yuwen Hu assembled an army of 200,000 for a three-pronged invasion of Qi.

Emperor Wucheng initially ordered the Prince of Lanling, Gao Changgong and Hulü Guang to oppose the invasion, but seeing the size of enemy forces, they were hesitant to advance and only camped at the foot of Mount Mang. Feeling helpless, Wucheng then wanted to summon Duan Shao, but concerned of the Göktürk threat on the border, the emperor asked him if it was advisable to do so. Duan asserted that the Göktürk issue was minor compared to the Northern Zhou invasion and insisted that he march south, so Wucheng ordered him to march from Jinyang with a thousand elite cavalries while he led his own army from behind.

After five days of forced marching, Duan Shao crossed the Yellow River with his forces. Coincidentally, the area had been covered by fog for days. When he arrived near Luoyang, Duan led 300 cavalrymen up Mount Mang to observe the Northern Zhou formation. While advancing through Taihe Valley (太和谷; east of Luoyang), he unexpectedly encountered the Zhou army. He immediately sent messengers to alert all his camps, rally the troops and form a battle array, with him commanding the left, Gao Changgong commanding the centre and Hulü Guang commanding the right. The Zhou army also did not expect the Qi army's arrival and were petrified.

Duan Shao shouted at them, "Your Yuwen Hu was blessed to receive his mother, and yet refuse to repay our kindness. What is your reason for coming here today?" Someone among the Zhou army replied, "Heaven has sent us here. What is there to ask?" Duan then said, "Heaven rewards the virtuous and punishes the wicked. Perhaps they are sending you to die!" The Zhou army then placed their infantry to lead the vanguard and ordered them to charge at the Qi army from the top of the mountain. Duan utilized his cavalry speed and retreated, luring the Zhou infantry into giving chase. Once the infantry was exhausted, the Qi cavalrymen dismounted and engaged them in close combat. The Zhou army was routed and collapsed, with many of the soldiers falling off the ravines to their deaths.

After this encounter, Duan Shao, Gao Changgong and Hulü Guang defeated the remaining Zhou forces besieging Luoyang. As the Zhou army retreated, they left behind large scatters of military supplies and weapons between Mount Mang and the Gu river (谷水). Soon, Emperor Wucheng arrived at Luoyang to comfort his soldiers and held a feast for his generals at Heyin (河陰, in modern Luoyang, Henan). For his great victory, Duan Shao was appointed Grand Chancellor and given the additional fief of Duke of Lingwu County.

== Service under Gao Wei ==
=== Emperor Wucheng's regency ===
In 565, Emperor Wucheng decided to take up the title of retired emperor and pass the throne to his crown prince, Gao Wei. During the abdication, Duan Shao, at the time serving as Grand Commandant, was tasked with presenting Gao Wei with the imperial seal and ribbon. In 567, after the death of Hulü Jin, Duan Shao filled his position as Prime Minister of the Left. At the same time, he was also given the title of Duke of Yongchang Commandery. In 569, shortly after Gao Zhan died in retirement, Duan Shao participated in a plot led by the Prince of Zhao, Gao Rui to remove the favoured minister, He Shikai which ended in failure, although Duan did not appear to face any repercussions for his involvement.

=== Capture of Baigu ===
In 571, Duan Shao went to Dinglong (定隴) via the roads in Jin province to build the cities of Weidi (威敵) and Pingkou (平寇) before returning to capital. Since the previous year, the Northern Zhou general, Yuwen Xian was engaged in a stalemate with Hulü Guang at Yiyang, and in February or March 571, Yuwen crossed the Yellow River at Longmen and forced Hulü to fall back to Huagu (華谷; northwest of present-day Jishan County, Shanxi). Duan Shao and Gao Changgong received an imperial decree to resist the Yuwen Xian at the western border the following month. Near the battlefield was the strategic Zhou city of Baigu (柏谷; southwest of present-day Lingbao City, Henan), which the Qi generals from did not dare attack due to their tall defensive walls. Duan Shao insisted that they take the city to cut Yuwen Xian's army from reinforcements and believed that the walls were thin enough to be destroyed by crossbows. The generals agreed and sent their troops with beating drums to take the city. After breaching through the walls, they captured the Zhou general, Xue Jingli (薛敬禮) and killed many of his soldiers. They then built a city at Huagu, where they set up garrisons before returning home victorious. Duan Shao was conferred the title of Duke of Guangping for his victory.

=== Battle of Dingyang ===
The same month, the Zhou general, Yuwen Chun embarked to capture Yiyang and nine other cities of Qi. Hulü Guang brought 50,000 troops to oppose him, and Duan Shao requested to join him. In May or June, the Duan Shao attacked Qincheng (秦城). The Zhou officer, Guo Rong (郭榮) rebuilt a city south of Yaoxiang (姚襄城), linking it to Dingyang (定陽; present-day Ji County, Shanxi) to the east and digging trenches to cut off access. Duan Shao secretly led his troops to attack from the north and sent men across the Yellow River to contact potential defectors within Yaoxiang. The defenders of Yaoxiang were only aware of Duan's plans once over a thousand of their residents crossed the Yellow River to join the Qi. Duan then attacked Yaoxiang and greatly routed them, capturing several of their envoys including Ruogan Xianbao (若干顯寶). The Qi generals wanted to follow up their victory by attacking the new city, but Duan believed that it was too dangerous. He instead proposed that they build another city to block the Zhou retreat, capture Qincheng and attack Dingyang with their full force, which they all approved.

In June or July, Duan Shao advanced to besiege Dingyang. The Zhou Inspector of Fen province, Yang Fu (楊敷) held firmly to the city, making it difficult for the attackers to break through. Duan climbed up a mountain to observe the interior of the city and then ordered a fierce attack. The following month, the Qi army captured the outer city along with many prisoners. At this point, however, Duan Shao suddenly fell ill. With the inner city yet to be captured, he told Gao Changgong, "The city is surrounded by ravines on three sides, with no way for them to get through. My only worry is the southeast. If the enemy is looking to break out, then it will most certainly be through there. But if you defend that area with elite troops, then they will surely be captured." Gao Changgong thus ordered more than a thousand soldiers to lay an ambush at the southeast ravine. As Duan Shao predicted, the defenders attempted to abandon the city by fleeing through the southeast, but Gao Changgong ambushed and routed them, capturing Yang Fu and all of his soldiers.

== Death and posthumous honours ==
As Duan Shao's health continued to deteriorate, he led his army back to Ye. The court acknowledged his success and conferred him the title of Duke of Leling Commandery, while his eldest son, Duan Shen was enfeoffed the Prince of Jibei. On 18 October 571, Duan Shao died of illness. He was posthumously given tally and appointed Bearer of the Gilded Battle-Axe, Chief Controller of military affairs of the twelve provinces of Shuo, Bing, Ding, Zhao, Yi, Cang, Qi, Yan, Liang, Luo, Jin and Jian, Prime Minister, Grand Commandant, Manager of the Affairs of the Masters of Writing and Inspector of Shuo province. He was also given the posthumous name of "Zhongwu".

== Character ==
The Book of Northern Qi describes Duan Shao as a cautious and gentle individual with the "demeanor of a prime minister", educating his children and maintaining a respectful household. His filial piety towards his stepmother, Lady Liang was widely praised as it was a practice seldom found among the nobility of Qi.

However, the same record also criticizes him of being lustful and greedy. Despite holding a high position, Duan Shao often travelled in secrecy. There was a certain Lady Huangfu (皇甫氏), who was the wife of the official Yuan Yu (元瑀). Yuan Yu's brother, Yuan Jin (元謹), was imprisoned for plotting treason, so Lady Huangfu was barred from entering the palace. Captivated by Lady Huangfu's beauty and character, Duan Shao repeatedly asked Gao Cheng to give her to him as a wife. Gao Cheng could not go against his wishes, and thus agreed. He also refused to give any of his money to anyone, including his relatives and old friends. When his son, Duan Shen (段深) married a princess, he had his officials come to his house to help with the wedding for more than ten days. After the wedding was over and everyone had left, Duan Shao only paid his officials with a glass of wine each.

== Sources ==
- Book of Northern Qi
- History of the Northern Dynasties
- Zizhi Tongjian
