= Gao Yanzong =

Northern Qi Chinese prince

- Reign: January 18, 577 – January 21, 577
- Died: c.November 577
Full name
- Family name: Gāo (高); Given name: Yánzōng (延宗)
Era name and dates
- Déchāng (德昌): January 18, 577 – January 21, 577
- Dynasty: Northern Qi

Gao Yanzong (高延宗) (died c.November 577), often known by his princely title of Prince of Ande (安德王), was an imperial prince of the Chinese Northern Qi dynasty, who briefly claimed the imperial title in 577 for three days as his cousin, the emperor Gao Wei, fled in the face of an attack by rival Northern Zhou. Traditional historians usually did not consider him an emperor of Northern Qi.

== Background ==
Gao Yanzong was the fifth son of Gao Cheng, who was the heir of Eastern Wei's paramount general Gao Huan, and who took over the regency of Eastern Wei after Gao Huan's death in 547. Gao Yanzong's mother was Gao Cheng's concubine Lady Chen, who was previously a concubine of Yuan Dan (元湛) the Prince of Guangyang, but his birth year is not known in history. As Gao Cheng was assassinated by his servant Lan Jing (蘭京) in 549, Gao Yanzong was raised by Gao Cheng's younger brother Gao Yang, who seized the throne from Emperor Xiaojing of Eastern Wei in 550, establishing Northern Qi as its Emperor Wenxuan. Emperor Wenxuan was described as loving Gao Yanzong so much that even when Gao Yanzong was 11, he still had Gao Yanzong ride him as part of a game. In or sometime before 555, Emperor Wenxuan asked Gao Yanzong what princely title he wanted, and Gao Yanzong responded, "I want to be the Prince of Chongtian (衝天, meaning, "rising to heaven")." The prime minister Yang Yin commented, "There is no such commandery on earth. I wish that he would be satisfied (安, an) with virtues (德, de)." Emperor Wenxuan thus created Gao Yanzong the Prince of Ande on 21 February 555.

During the subsequent reign of Emperor Xiaozhao, another uncle of Gao Yanzong's, Gao Yanzong was the governor of Ding Province (定州, roughly modern Baoding, Hebei). He was accused of abusing his staff—including defecating upstairs and forcing someone to receive the feces downstairs in his mouth, and mixing feces with pork and serving it to others, and those who would not eat it would be whipped. When Emperor Xiaozhao heard this, he had the official Zhao Daode (趙道德) go to Ding Province to cane Gao Yanzong 100 times. As Gao Yanzong did not take the punishment with good attitude, Zhao added 30 times to his caning. Gao Yanzong was also known for testing the sharpness of his sword by cutting humans with it, and for tolerating his staff of abuses. During the subsequent reign of another uncle, Emperor Wucheng, Emperor Wucheng sent messengers to whip him for these abuses and executed nine of his associates. Thereafter, Gao Yanzong regretted his actions and changed his ways. In 566, when Emperor Wucheng tortured his brother Gao Xiaowan (高孝琬) the Prince of Hejian to death, Gao Yanzong mourned greatly, and he made an effigy of Emperor Wucheng out of straw and whipped it, stating, "Why kill my brother?" When his servant informed Emperor Wucheng, Emperor Wucheng whipped Gao Yanzong 100 times, nearly causing his death. Subsequently, however, Gao Yanzong was rotated through a number of important offices. In 569, after Emperor Wucheng's death, he was one of the individuals who tried to persuade Emperor Wucheng's son Gao Wei and wife Empress Dowager Hu to remove Emperor Wucheng's favorite official He Shikai from his post, but was ultimately unsuccessful in doing so. Subsequently, in 571, after Gao Wei's brother Gao Yan killed He Shikai in a coup, Gao Yanzong, along with his brother Gao Xiaoheng (高孝珩) the Prince of Guangning, tried to encourage Gao Yan to take further action to seize power, but Gao Yan hesitated and was ultimately defeated and killed.

== Brief claim on imperial title ==
In 576, Emperor Wu of Northern Zhou launched a major attack on Northern Qi, capturing Pingyang (平陽, in modern Linfen, Shanxi). Gao Wei subsequently led a large army to try to recapture Pingyang, defended by the Northern Zhou general Liang Shiyan (梁士彥), and Gao Yanzong served under Gao Wei in the campaign. When Northern Zhou's Emperor Wu subsequently arrived with an army to try to relieve Pingyang around new year 577, Gao Wei engaged Emperor Wu. However, shortly after battle began, Gao Wei's favorite consort, Feng Xiaolian and the official Mu Tipo panicked and persuaded Gao Wei to flee, causing the Northern Qi army to collapse. Only Gao Yanzong suffered no losses and was able to withdraw to the secondary capital Jinyang (晉陽, in modern Taiyuan, Shanxi), where Gao Wei fled. When Gao Wei informed Gao Yanzong that he planned to flee further to Shuo Province (朔州, roughly modern Shuozhou, Shanxi), Gao Yanzong wept and tried to encourage him to defend Jinyang, but Gao Wei would not listen, and instead first delivered his mother Empress Dowager Hu and his crown prince Gao Heng to Shuo Province.

Two days later, with Northern Zhou forces approaching, Gao Wei made Gao Yanzong the governor of Bing Province (并州, roughly modern Taiyuan) and put him in charge of the remaining forces in the region, intending to flee to Shuo Province (again Gao Yanzong's advice). (Once Gao Wei left Jinyang, however, he changed his mind and fled back to the capital Yecheng instead.)

Meanwhile, the generals at Jinyang all encouraged Gao Yanzong to take imperial title, stating to him that if he did not, they could not fight and die for him. The day after Gao Wei left Jinyang, Gao Yanzong agreed and declared himself emperor. When he did so, the people of the surrounding region rushed to support him, and he opened Gao Wei's private treasury at Jinyang to reward the treasure to the soldiers, along with the ladies in waiting of Jinyang Palace. He also confiscated the properties of Gao Wei's favorite eunuchs. It was said that Gao Yanzong visited the soldiers and shook their hands, referring to himself by name, to raise the morale. Meanwhile, he sent messengers to his uncle Gao Jie (高湝) the Prince of Rencheng, stating that he was only taking imperial title out of expediency and that Gao Jie should be emperor. (Gao Jie did not accept the overture, and instead arrested Gao Yanzong's messengers and delivered them to Gao Wei.)

The next day, Northern Zhou troops arrived and put Jinyang under siege. Gao Yanzong, despite his obesity, personally fought in the battle, and while he had some personal successes, the generals that he left in charge of the east gate, He Aganzi (和阿干子) and Duan Chang (段暢), surrendered to Northern Zhou, allowing Emperor Wu to enter the city—but once Emperor Wu did, Gao Yanzong followed and launched a fierce attack, leading to a general rout of Northern Zhou troops. Emperor Wu was nearly killed, but was able to fight his way back out of the city. Gao Yanzong thought that Emperor Wu must be dead and searched the bodies for him, but could not find him. Meanwhile, his own soldiers, in celebration of the great victory, drank heavily and could not be regrouped.

Two days later, Emperor Wu regrouped and again attacked Jinyang's east gate and was able to breach it. Gao Yanzong resisted, but was worn out, and he fled. Northern Zhou forces gave chase and captured him. Emperor Wu got off his horse and personally shook Gao Yanzong's hand. Gao Yanzong initially declined, stating, "How can a dead man's hand touch that of the supreme ruler?" Emperor Wu responded, in an implicit recognition of Gao Yanzong's imperial claim, "The emperors of the two states fight not out of enmity but rather out of the welfare of the people. I will not harm you. Please do not worry." He had Gao Yanzong change into civilian official uniform and treated him with respect, asking him for his input on how Yecheng could be captured. Gao Yanzong initially refused to answer, but later stated, "I cannot imagine what might happen if the Prince of Rencheng reinforced and defended the city, but if the emperor himself defended the city, Your Imperial Majesty's servants would not even see blood on their swords."

== Death ==
Consistent with Gao Yanzong's prediction, Gao Wei abandoned Yecheng and fled south, intending to try to reorganize resistance south of the Yellow River and, if he could not do so, flee to the Chen dynasty. In flight, however, Gao Wei was captured by Northern Zhou troops and delivered to Emperor Wu, who subsequently annexed Northern Qi and took Gao Wei and the other Gao clan members, including Gao Yanzong, back to his capital of Chang'an. Emperor Wu created Gao Wei the Duke of Wen and was said to have bestowed more than 30 princes of the Gao clan noble titles, but there was no record as to what title he gave Gao Yanzong. When he invited them to a feast and had Gao Wei dance during the feast, Gao Yanzong was so saddened that he wanted to commit suicide by poison, but his servants persuaded him not to.

In winter 577, Emperor Wu, apprehensive of the Gao clan, decided to massacre them. He therefore falsely accused Gao Wei of conspiring with Mu Tipo to rebel, and ordered Gao Wei and other members of the Gao clan to commit suicide. Many members of the Gao clan clamored and proclaimed their innocence, begging to be spared, but Gao Yanzong rolled up his sleeve and wept, not saying anything. The executioners had to stuff poisonous peppers into his mouth to kill him. In 578, his wife Princess Li took his body and buried it.

== Personal information ==
- Father
  - Gao Cheng, regent of Eastern Wei, posthumously honored as Emperor Wenxiang
- Mother
  - Lady Chen, Gao Cheng's concubine
- Wife
  - Princess Li Baoxin
- Brother
  - Gao Changgong, Prince of Lanling

Chinese royalty
| Preceded by Gao Wei | Emperor of Northern Qi (Shanxi); 577 | Claim extinguished |
| Preceded by Gao Wei | Emperor of China (Shanxi); 577 | Succeeded by Emperor Wu of Northern Zhou |
