= Empress Gao (Eastern Wei) =

Empress of the Xianbei-led Chinese Eastern Wei dynasty

Empress Gao (Chinese: 高皇后, personal name unknown) was an empress of the Xianbei-led Chinese Eastern Wei dynasty. Her husband was Emperor Xiaojing, Eastern Wei's only emperor.

She was the second daughter of the paramount general Gao Huan, who, after a formal break with Emperor Xiaowu of Northern Wei in 534, made Xiaojing, then age 10, emperor, thus dividing Northern Wei into Eastern Wei and Western Wei. In 539, Gao Huan married her to Emperor Xiaojing. It is not known whether Emperor Xiaojing's only son known by name, Yuan Zhangren (元長仁), who was created crown prince in 549, was her son or not. (He had two other sons whose names are lost to history.)

In 550, Empress Gao's brother Gao Yang, who had by that point succeeded Gao Huan and another son of Gao Huan's, Gao Cheng, forced Emperor Xiaojing to yield the throne to him, ending Eastern Wei and starting Northern Qi as its Emperor Wenxuan. He created the former Emperor Xiaojing the Prince of Zhongshan, and created the former Empress Gao the Princess Taiyuan, and she therefore carried double titles. Fearful that her brother, who was known for his violent nature, would harm her husband, she took her husband wherever she went, and she also tasted all of his food to make sure that it was not poisoned. Despite her precautions, however, she could not prevent his death, as around the new year 552, Emperor Wenxuan invited her to the palace for a feast, and then, as she was attending the feast, he sent assassins to force the Prince of Zhongshan and his three sons to drink poisoned wine.

Later in 552, Emperor Wenxuan married the Princess Taiyuan to one of his officials, Yang Yin. That was the last reference to her in history, and it is not known whether she survived to 560, when Yang was killed by another brother of hers, Gao Yan the Prince of Changshan in a power struggle.

Chinese royalty
Preceded by Empress Gao (Xiaowu)	Empress of Northern Wei (Eastern); 539–550	Dynasty ended
Preceded by Empress Gao (Xiaowu)	Empress of China (Northern/Central); 539–550	Succeeded by Empress Li Zu'e of Northern Qi
