= Princess Pingyi =

Yuan Zhonghua 元仲華
- Princess Pingyi of Northern Wei; Empress Wenxiang 文襄皇后 (honored in 550)
- Spouse: Gao Cheng
- Issue: Gao Xiaowan, Prince of Hejian; Princess Le'an (樂安公主); Second daughter
Posthumous name
- Empress Jing 敬皇后
- Father: Yuan Dan, Prince Wenxuan of Qinghe

Princess Pingyi (馮翊公主), later honored as Empress Wenxiang (文襄皇后), formally posthumously honored as Empress Jing (敬皇后, literally "the respected empress") by Northern Qi, was a princess of the Chinese Northern Wei dynasty and its branch successor state Eastern Wei. She was the sister of Emperor Xiaojing of Eastern Wei, and the wife of Eastern Wei's paramount official Gao Cheng, son of Gao Huan.

It is not known when she was born to Yuan Dan (元亶) the Prince of Qinghe, a grandson of Emperor Xiaowen, but what is known is that during the reign of Emperor Xiaowu (532-535), she was created the Princess Pingyi. In 534, Emperor Xiaowu, seeking to escape the grasp of Gao Huan, fled west from the capital Luoyang to the domain of the independent general Yuwen Tai. Gao Huan subsequently made her brother Yuan Shanjian emperor (as Emperor Xiaojing), signifying a division of Northern Wei into Eastern Wei (with Emperor Xiaojing as emperor) and Western Wei (with Emperor Xiaowu as emperor). She was subsequently given to Gao Huan's son Gao Cheng as his wife, although the date of the marriage is not known.

Princess Pingyi was said to be both beautiful and virtuous. In 541, she bore Gao Cheng a son, Gao Xiaowan (高孝琬). Emperor Xiaojing personally visited Gao Cheng and her to congratulate them. Later, she also bore him two daughters.

Gao Cheng was assassinated by his servant Lan Jing (蘭京) in 549, and Gao Cheng's brother Gao Yang took over his position of power. In 550, Gao Yang forced Emperor Xiaojing to yield the throne to him, ending Eastern Wei and starting Northern Qi (as its Emperor Wenxuan). Emperor Wenxuan honored Gao Cheng as Emperor Wenxiang, and thus honored her as Empress Wenxiang, settling her at Jingde Palace (靜德宮). In 555, with Emperor Wenxuan growing increasingly unstable in his mental state, he forced her to move out of Jingde Palace. Further, alleging that Gao Cheng had previously forced his wife Empress Li Zu'e to have sexual relations with Gao Cheng, Emperor Wenxuan forced her to have sexual relations with him.

Nothing further concrete was recorded about her in history. She died sometime between 570 and 576 and was buried with Gao Cheng with honors due an empress.
