= Gao Anagong =

Xianbei Chinese official

Gao Anagong (Chinese: 高阿那肱; died November 18, 580) was an ethnic Xianbei official of China's Northern Qi dynasty. He was a close associate of the emperor Gao Wei, and late in Gao Wei's reign, he dominated the political scene along with Mu Tipo and Han Zhangluan. While probably not as corrupt as Mu and Mu's mother and Gao Wei's wet nurse Lu Lingxuan, he was known for incompetence. In 577, with Northern Qi under major attack by the Northern Zhou dynasty, after Gao Wei fled the capital Yecheng, Gao Anagong betrayed him and gave him false information, allowing Northern Zhou forces to capture him. In 580, with the Northern Zhou in civil war between the regent Yang Jian and the general Yuchi Jiong, Gao Anagong was on Yuchi's side and, after Yuchi's defeat, was executed.

== During Northern Qi ==
Gao Anagong was from Shanwu Commandery (善無, roughly modern Xinzhou, Shanxi). His father Gao Shigui (高市貴) was a follower of Gao Huan, the paramount general of Eastern Wei, the predecessor state of Northern Qi, and whose sons eventually became emperors of Northern Qi. Gao Anagong served in the military and was known for his bravery and abilities in archery and horseriding. During the early reign of Emperor Wenxuan, he participated in the emperor's northern campaigns against the Khitan and Rouran. On one occasion, Emperor Wenxuan was pursuing the Rouran army and dispatched Anagong to cut off their retreat. The Rouran still numbered 50,000, so Anagong requested for more troops. Instead of granting his request, Wenxuan reduced Anagong's troops by half and sent him ahead. Anagong fought hard, and the Rouran army was defeated. His contributions against the Khitan and Rouran earned him recognition within the empire.

Despite his military capabilities, he was also known for his ability to flatter people of higher status, and he became a favorite of both Gao Wei's father Emperor Wucheng and the powerful official He Shikai. After Gao Wei became emperor in 565, Gao Anagong continued to be promoted, eventually to the title of Prince of Huaiyin. He became particularly powerful after the death of He Shikai in 571 and the general Hulü Guang in 572, becoming known, along with Mu and Han as the "Three Nobles."

In 575, emboldened by the Northern Qi's defeat to the Chen dynasty in the Huainan, Emperor Wu of the rival Northern Zhou personally led his forces to invade them laid siege to the city of Heyin. Gao Anagong brought an army south from Jinyang to reinforce Heyin. With Emperor Wu also suddenly falling ill during the campaign, the Zhou forces withdrew as soon as Anagong arrived.

In winter 577, Emperor Wu launched another major attack on Northern Qi's important city Pingyang (平陽, in modern Linfen, Shanxi), but despite the urgency of the matter, Gao Anagong delayed notification to Gao Wei, who was then hunting with his favorite concubine Consort Feng Xiaolian at Qilian Lake (祁連池, in modern Xinzhou). He did not inform Gao Wei of the attack until Pingyang fell. During the subsequent struggle for Pingyang, Gao Anagong began secret communications with Northern Zhou forces, and the communications intensified after Gao Wei abandoned the secondary capital Jinyang (晉陽, in modern Taiyuan, Shanxi) around the new year 578, fleeing back to Yecheng.

With Northern Zhou forces approaching Yecheng, Gao Wei abandoned Yecheng as well and fled south of the Yellow River, intending to try to regroup and make one final stand, and flee to the Chen dynasty if he failed. He initially fled to Ji Province (濟州, roughly modern Liaocheng, Shandong), but then headed further to Qing Province (青州, roughly modern Qingzhou, Shandong). He left Gao Anagong in charge of defending Ji Province and notifying him as to Northern Zhou's advances. However, Gao Anagong made a secret offer to betray Gao Wei, and he sent false information to Gao Wei, making Gao Wei believing that Northern Zhou forces were not advancing quickly. When Northern Zhou forces arrived at Ji Province, Gao Anagong surrendered and directed them toward Qing Province, and they were able to capture Gao Wei with relative ease.

== After Northern Qi's destruction ==
For Gao Anagong's betrayal of Gao Wei, Emperor Wu created him a duke and made him the governor of Long Province (隆州, roughly modern Nanchong, Sichuan). After the death of Emperor Wu's son and successor Emperor Xuan in 580, the government was seized by Emperor Xuan's father-in-law Yang Jian. The general Yuchi Jiong rose against Yang, and joining him were the generals Sima Xiaonan (司馬消難) and Wang Qian (王謙). Wang, the military commander of the modern Sichuan region, was Gao Anagong's superior, and he followed Wang's orders. In winter 580, after Yuchi had already been defeated and committed suicide and Sima had fled to Chen, Yang Jian sent the general Liang Rui (梁睿) against Wang. Liang defeated Wang and captured him and Gao Anagong, and then executed both of them. Yang subsequently awarded Gao Anagong's mansion to the former Northern Qi official Li Delin.
