= Yang Yin =

Official of Northern Qi (511-560)

Yang Yin (楊愔) (511 – 4 April 560 (Note: The Zizhi Tongjian had a similar record, and went on to indicate that Gao Yan appointed himself Grand Chancellor and overall-in-charge of all military affairs on 7 April.)), courtesy name Zhunyan (遵彦), nickname Qinwang (秦王), was a high-level official of the Chinese Northern Qi dynasty.

== Background ==
Yang Yin came from a clan that produced many officials of Northern Wei, including his father Yang Jin. (Note: The biographies of Yang Yin's male ancestors can be found in vol.41 of Bei Shi.)

At the age of 5, Yang Yin studied the histories; by 10, he was studying the Shi Jing, and the I Ching, but particularly favored the Zuo Zhuan version of the Spring and Autumn Annals.

In 526, during the reign of Emperor Xiaoming, Northern Wei was suffering greatly from agrarian rebellions, and Yang Jin was commissioned with an army as the governor of Ding Province, roughly modern Baoding, Hebei). Yang Yin accompanied his father to Ding Province, and on account of his contribution to his father's campaign, was created the Baron of Weichang. However, Yang Yin did not accept this appointment. On 12 February 528, Ding Province fell to the rebel general Du Luozhou, and Yang Jing's household was imprisoned by Du. (Note: The Bei Shi had a different record on Yang Jin's titles at the time.) Soon thereafter, Du was defeated by another rebel general, Ge Rong. Ge wanted to marry one of his daughters to Yang Yin and make him an official, but Yang, not willing to accept Ge's commission, pretended to be ill by holding cow blood in his mouth and then spitting it out. In 529, after Ge Rong had been defeated by the Northern Wei paramount general Erzhu Rong, Yang Yin returned to the Northern Wei capital Luoyang and was made a low level imperial official in the administration of Emperor Xiaozhuang. Later that year, when Yuan Hao the Prince of Beihai claimed imperial title under support from Liang Dynasty and captured Luoyang briefly, forcing Emperor Xiaozhuang to flee, Yang Yin convinced his cousin Yang Kan to remain loyal to Emperor Xiaozhuang. However, after Yuan Hao was subsequently defeated by Erzhu, permitting Emperor Xiaozhuang to return to Luoyang, Yang Yin believed that the empire was not yet at peace and decided to leave governmental service, taking up a hermit's existence with his friend Xing Shao at Mount Song.

== Service under Gao Huan and Gao Cheng ==
Thereafter, however, Yang Yin's cousin Yang Youqing, while advising Emperor Xiaowu, whom Gao Huan had made emperor, used strong language that offended Emperor Xiaowu and was put to death. Another member of Gao's staff, Guo Xiu, was jealous of Yang's abilities, and he therefore gave Yang false news that Gao was intending to deliver him to Emperor Xiaowu. Yang therefore pretended to have committed suicide by drowning, but changed his name to Liu Shi'an and fled to Guang Province, roughly modern Yantai, Shandong) and hid on an island. In 535, after Northern Wei had divided into Eastern Wei (with Gao in control) and Western Wei (with Yuwen Tai in control), Gao heard that Yang was still alive, and had the governor of Guang Province find him and invite him back to serve on staff. Yang agreed, and Gao married one of his daughters by a concubine to Yang. He subsequently gradually rose in ranks. (Note: However, the Book of Wei recorded that Yang married Princess Taiyuan, widow of Emperor Xiaojing of Eastern Wei. Princess Taiyuan's mother was Lou Zhaojun.) After Gao Huan's death in 547, Yang continued to serve Gao Huan's heir Gao Cheng, who took over as regent. In 549, Gao Cheng convened a meeting with Yang, Chen Yuankang, and Cui Jishu to discuss the process of seizing the throne from Emperor Xiaojing of Eastern Wei, when Gao Cheng's slave Lan Jing (son of Lan Qin) made a surprise attack on Gao Cheng, killing him and Chen. Yang was able to flee from Lan's attack and was not killed. Subsequently, Gao Cheng's younger brother Gao Yang took over the regency, and on 9 June 550 took over the throne, ending Eastern Wei and establishing Northern Qi.

== Service under Emperor Wenxuan ==
Emperor Wenxuan made Yang Yin his prime minister and created him the Duke of Huashan, and during Emperor Wenxuan's reign, Yang served capably, finding appropriate officials for the key posts. Therefore, although Emperor Wenxuan, particularly late in his reign, turned violent and wasteful, the imperial government nevertheless functioned effectively. Yang was praised for remembering those who had helped him in the past, repaying them greatly, but not bearing grudges against those who had tried to hurt him. With Emperor Wenxuan, in his late years, accustomed to killing people for entertainment while he was drunk, Yang thought of an unusual solution—he sent a supply of condemned prisoners to the palace, to be killed whenever Emperor Wenxuan wanted to kill someone; if the prisoners could survive three months without being killed, they would be freed. Emperor Wenxuan's brother Gao Jun the Prince of Yong'an, once rebuked Yang for not trying to dissuade Emperor Wenxuan from his behavior, and Yang, who knew that Emperor Wenxuan was particularly suspicious whenever governmental officials conversed with imperial princes, reported the conversation to Emperor Wenxuan, eventually leading to Gao Jun's imprisonment and death. By 559, Yang's title was Prince of Kaifeng.

== Service under Emperor Fei ==
Emperor Fei's uncle Gao Yan the Prince of Changshan, while respected by the people, was not given great power, and while his (and Emperor Wenxuan's) mother Empress Dowager Lou Zhaojun had some desire to have Gao Yan made emperor instead, there was insufficient support at the time, and Yang, in fear that Gao Yan and another brother of Emperor Wenxuan, Gao Zhan the Prince of Changguang, would try to take power, took steps to curb their authorities. Emperor Fei honored his grandmother Empress Dowager Lou as grand empress dowager and mother Empress Li Zu'e as empress dowager. Pursuant to his edicts, the palace construction projects that Emperor Wenxuan started, which caused much misery for his people in the latter years of his reign, were halted.

Once the imperial train arrived at Yecheng, the situation became even more tense, as an associate of Yang's, Kezhuhun Tianhe, was convinced that Emperor Fei would not be safe in his reign unless his two uncles were killed, and alternatively, Yan Zixian considered putting Grand Empress Dowager Lou, who still wielded much power as the clan matriarch, under house arrest, and forcing her to turn her authorities to Empress Dowager Li. Meanwhile, the ambitious Yang was carrying out a governmental reorganization scheme to trim unnecessary offices and titles and to remove incompetent officials. The officials who were hurt by Yang's actions became disaffected and largely hoped that Gao Yan and Gao Zhan would take action and began to encourage them to do so. Yang considered sending Gao Yan and Gao Zhan outside the capital to be provincial governors, but Emperor Fei initially disagreed. Yang wrote a submission to Empress Dowager Li to ask her to consider, and she consulted her lady in waiting Li Changyi, who leaked the news to Grand Empress Dowager Lou. She informed the two princes, and they set up an ambush, with Gao Guiyan and the generals Heba Ren and Hulü Jin, at a ceremony where Gao Yan was to be named to a ceremonial post. Yang, Kezhuhun, Yan, Zheng Yi (郑颐), and Song Qindao were all severely battered and captured.

Gao Yan and Gao Zhan subsequently entered the palace and accused Yang and his associates of crimes. They were all executed on 4 April 560, although Grand Empress Dowager Lou, who was otherwise supportive of her son Gao Yan's actions, personally attended Yang's wake and made the comment, "Lord Yang was faithful and suffered for his faithfulness." (Note: Hu Sanxing wrote that Empress Dowager Lou's words here were from her conscience and sense of right and wrong.) Before he was executed, Yang Yin had lost an eye during the torture; (Note: When Empress Dowager Lou asked for Yang Yin's whereabouts, Heba Ren replied that Yang had lost an eye.) Empress Dowager Lou ordered that a replacement eye be made of gold from the royal treasury; she then personally placed the golden eye into Yang's eye socket, saying, "This is an expression of my will." It was then that Gao Yan regretted killing Yang.
