= Lan Qin (Liang dynasty) =

Chinese military general

- 蘭欽

Inspector of Heng province (衡州刺史)
- In office 535–?
- Monarch: Emperor Wu of Liang

Personal details
- Born: Unknown Handan, Hebei
- Died: 544
- Children: Lan Xiali; Lan Jing
- Parent: Lan Ziyun (father)
- Courtesy name: Xiuming (休明)
- Peerage: Duke of Qujiang County (曲江縣公)

Lan Qin (died 544), courtesy name Xiuming, was a military general of the Liang dynasty during the Northern and Southern dynasties period. He was one of the generals under Emperor Wu of Liang who participated in the expeditions during the widespread unrest in the Northern Wei. He was most known for his expedition of 535, during which he captured the Hanzhong region from the Western Wei and forced Yuwen Tai into suing for peace. His renown was equal to that of his peer, Chen Qingzhi, but he was poisoned in the end by a member of the imperial family who envied his position as the Inspector of Guang province (including modern Guangdong, Hong Kong and Northern Guangxi).

== Background ==
Lan Qin and his family were initially from Zhongchang County (中昌; in present-day Daming County, Hebei), Wei Commandery in the Northern Wei. According to the Book of Liang, he was born in 502, but the History of the Southern Dynasties indicate that he may have been born earlier. At the end of the Liu Song dynasty, he and his father, Lan Ziyun (蘭子雲), moved to the Northern Wei city of Luoyang, where they often swindled camels for a living. Later, the two went to join the southern dynasties, and during the Tianjian era (502–519) under Emperor Wu of Liang, Lan Ziyun distinguished himself in the military and rose to the rank of Inspector of Ji province.

Lan Qin was described as quick-witted and decisive from a young age. The History of the Southern Dynasties also states that he was remarkably agile, claiming that he can walk up to 200 li a day. He followed his father on one of his northern expeditions and performed with merit, earning him the office of General of the Guards.

== Service under the Liang dynasty ==
=== The Northern Expedition of 527 ===
In 527, Emperor Wu, taking advantage of the internal strife in the Northern Wei, sent an army up north to capture more territory. Lan Qin took part in the campaign, and early on, he captured the Northern Wei city of Xiaocheng and defeated the general, Jiao Zhong (郊仲) at Pengcheng. He then attacked Nishan city (擬山城), where the Book of Liang claimed that he defeated the area's Grand Chief Controller, Liu Shu (劉屬) and his "200,000 troops." He then pressed on to Longcheng, seizing more than a thousand horses and defeated the Wei generals Chai Ji (柴集), the Administrator of Xiangcheng, Gao Xuan (高宣), Fan Sinian (范思念) and Zheng Chengzong (鄭承宗).

Lan Qin later attempted to capture Juegu (厥固; in present-day Huaibei, Anhui), Zhanglong (張龍) and Zicheng (子城) but was unsuccessful at first. The garrison commander at Pengcheng, Yang Yu (楊昱), sent his son, Yang Xiaoyong (楊孝邕) with light troops to reinforce the city, but Lan Qin met his army and defeated him. Lan Qin then defeated the Inspector of Qing province, Liu Haiyou (瀏海遊) before returning to Juegu and capturing the city along with its food supply. Yang Yu dispatched Fan Sinian and Cao Longya (曹龍牙) with tens of thousands of troops to recapture the city, but Lan Qin once again routed the Wei army. Cao Longya was killed in battle, and Lan Qin sent his head to the Liang capital, Jiankang.

=== Pacification of the tribes ===
Some time after the northern expedition, Lan Qin was appointed Chief Controller of the three commanderies in Heng province and ordered to attack the rebellious tribes in Guiyang, Yangshan and Shixing. He immediately quelled the rebellion upon his arrival, and was enfeoffed the Baron of Anhuai County as a reward. He also defeated the leader of the Tianqi tribes (天漆蠻), Wan Shide (晚時得). Later, the Inspector of Heng province, Yuan Qinghe, was besieged by rebels led by Yan Rong (嚴容) of Guiyang and sent envoys to request for aid. Lan Qin went to rescue Yuan and defeated the rebels at Luoxi (羅溪; in present-day Hengyang, Hunan), temporarily bringing peace to the caves around Changle (長樂).

The History of the Southern Dynasties also states that he once concurrently served as Commander of Wende and led an expedition to the five commandery caves of Nanzhong, where he pacified the rebelling tribes.

=== Conquest of Hanzhong ===
In 533, Emperor Wu secretly ordered Lan Qin to march to Weixing Commandery (魏興郡; around present-day Ankang, Shaanxi). As he was passing through Nanzheng, he received news that the Northern Wei general, Heba Sheng, was on his way to attack the key city of Xiangyang. Lan Qin was then ordered by Emperor Wu to rescue Xiangyang instead, but Heba later withdrew due to civil war back in Northern Wei. Nonetheless, Lan Qin was awarded the offices of Chief Controller of military affairs of the four provinces of Southern Liang, Nan, Northern Qin and Sha, General of Glorious Ferocity, Colonel Who Pacifies the West, Inspector of the two provinces of Liang and Qin. His peerage was also elevated to the Marquis of Anhuai County.

In 534, the Northern Wei was split into Western Wei and Eastern Wei, with the former retaining control over the Hanzhong region. In 535, two natives of Liang province, Huangfu Yuan (皇甫圓) and Jiang Yan (姜晏) rose up in revolt against the Western Wei. Lan Qin brought his forces to meet them, and in November, he defeated the Wei general Tong Sheng (通生) and captured Yuan Zili (元子禮), Xue Jun (薛俊) and Zhang Pusa (張菩薩). The Wei Inspector of Liang, Yuan Luo (元羅) decided to surrender, ceding control of the Hanzhong to the Liang dynasty. After the campaign, Lan Qin was promoted to General of Martial Wisdom.

Soon after, Emperor Wu assigned Lan Qin to Chief Controller of military affairs of Heng and Gui provinces and Inspector of Heng province. Before he could return to the court, the Western Wei dispatched Dong Shao (董紹) and Zhang Xian (張獻) to lay siege on Nanzheng. The Liang Inspector of Liang province, Du Huaibao (杜懷寶), requested for assistance, so Lan Qin led his troops back to attack Gaoqiao (高橋; north of present-day Hanzhong, Shaanxi) and defeated Dong Shao and Zhang Xian, killing 3,000 of their troops. Dong and Zhang retreated, and Lan Qin pursued them to Xie Valley (斜谷; in present-day Mei County, Shaanxi), where he nearly annihilated the Wei army. The paramount leader of Western Wei, Yuwen Tai sued for peace with the Liang and gifted Lan Qin 2,000 horses. Lan Qin had defeated the Wei army twice within a hundred days, which the Book of Liang reported that as a result, he "shook the neighbouring states with his prowess." Emperor Wu commended his achievements, appointing him as Regular Mounted Attendant and promoting him to General of Compassionate Authority before ordering him to return to court to report his deeds.

=== Service as an Inspector of Heng province ===
On his way to the court, Lan Qin passed through Guang province, where he defeated the commander of the Li people in Xijiang, Chen Wenche (陳文徹) and his brothers, capturing them all. He also seized numerous items and most notably obtained a large bronze drum, which had never been done in the previous dynasties. After arriving at his post in Heng province, Lan Qin was promoted to General Who Pacifies the South and enfeoffed as the Duke of Qujiang County. He policies were altruistic during his tenure in Heng, so much so that the people and officials of the province visited Jiankang to request for a monument dedicated to him to be erected. Emperor Wu approved their request, and later, he summoned Lan Qin to serve as a Palace Attendant and General of the Left Guard.

== Death ==
In 544, the Inspector of Guang province, Xiao Ying (蕭映) died in office. At the time, he was at conflict with Lý Bí, who had been leading a popular rebellion in Jiao province in the far south since 541. Emperor Wu commissioned for Lan Qin to replace him as the provincial inspector and continue his campaign against Lý Bí. The Marquis of Nan'an, Xiao Tian (蕭恬) stood in for him while he made the journey to his post, but Xiao Tian secretly wanted the position for himself. After hearing that Lan Qin had crossed the Wuling Mountains, Xiao Tian heavily bribed Lan Qin's chef to use a poisoned knife to cut a melon for Lan Qin to eat. Lan Qin died of poisoning, along with his concubine who also ate the poisoned melon.

Emperor Wu was furious when he heard of the incident and sent a prison cart to arrest Xiao Tian and strip him of his title. Lan Qin was posthumously appointed a Palace Attendant and General of the Central Guard, and he was also gifted a troupe of musicians. When he died, his childhood friend, Ouyang Wei, who had just been appointed Interior Minister of Linhe, requested that they transport Lan Qin's coffin to Jiankang first. He only took up his office once Lan Qin's burial ceremony was completed.

Lan Qin had two sons; Lan Xiali (蘭夏禮) and Lan Jing (蘭京). During Hou Jing's rebellion, Lan Xiali led troops to fight Hou Jing at Liyang in 548, but was killed in battle. Lan Jing, also known as Lan Gucheng (蘭固成), was captured by the Eastern Wei in an unknown year. His father offered to pay a large sum of ransom money for him but was refused, and he eventually ended up as a personal cook for the regent, Gao Cheng. During a meeting in 549, Lan Jing assassinated Gao Cheng and his advisor, Chen Yuankang, before he was caught and executed.

== Anecdotes ==
=== Apology to Yang Kan ===
While Lan Qin was serving as General of the Left Guard, he befriended the powerful minister, Zhu Yi and a favourite of the Crown Prince Xiao Gang, Wei Can (韋粲). On the other hand, he did not get along well with the Prefect of the Masters of Writing, He Jingrong (何敬容), whom he rarely visited despite serving in the same department. Lan Qin and He Jingrong attended a banquet together, but their conversation was very sparse. The Director of the Justice Department of the Imperial Secretariat, Yang Kan, noticed Lan Qin's behaviour and, despite Zhu Yi also being in attendance, shouted, "Boy! You used a bronze drum to buy Zhu Yi as your father and Wei Can as your brother! How dare you be impolite!"

Lan Qin later attended a ceremony at Hualin Garden (華林園), where he bowed and apologized to Yang Kan for his previous conduct. The minister, Wang Quan (王銓), said to Lan, "Your ability to bow to the honest and fair (Yang Kan) shows your ideal virtue. However, Lord Yang is still not impressed. Could you please bow down to him again?" Lan Qin then complied.

== Related texts ==
- Book of Liang
- Book of Northern Qi
- Book of Chen
- History of the Southern Dynasties
- Zizhi Tongjian
