= Mu Tipo =

Mu Tipo (Chinese: 穆提婆; died c.November 577), né Luo Tipo (駱提婆), was an ethnic Xianbei official of the Chinese Northern Qi dynasty. He was a close associate of the emperor Gao Wei, and during the latter part of Gao Wei's reign controlled the political scene along with his mother Lu Lingxuan, and the other favorites of Gao Wei, Han Zhangluan and Gao Anagong. In 577, in the midst of a major attack by rival Northern Zhou, Mu surrendered to Emperor Wu of Northern Zhou and was made a provincial governor, but after Northern Zhou destroyed Northern Qi and took over its territory, Emperor Wu falsely accused Mu of conspiring with Gao Wei, and killed Mu and forced Gao Wei and other members of the Gao clan to commit suicide.

== Background ==
It is not known when Luo Tipo was born. He was described as "from Hanyang Commandery" (roughly modern Tianshui, Gansu), but it is unclear whether this meant he was born there or merely that his ancestry was from there. Early in his life, his father Luo Chao (駱超) was accused of treason and executed, and both he and his mother Lu Lingxuan were seized and taken into the Northern Qi palace to be servants. Lady Lu eventually became the wet nurse to Gao Wei, the son of then-Prince of Changguang Gao Zhan, born in 557, and she became a close associate to Gao Zhan's wife Princess Hu. In 561, Gao Zhan became emperor (as Emperor Wucheng), and in 565, to deflect ill omens, he passed the throne to Gao Wei, although he retained imperial powers as Taishang Huang (retired emperor).

== During Gao Wei's reign ==
After Gao Wei became emperor, Lady Lu, as the young emperor's wet nurse, took the opportunity to take Luo Tipo into the palace to be Gao Wei's playmate, and Gao Wei and Luo Tipo became close friends, carrying out all kinds of activities together. Gao Wei, particularly after Emperor Wucheng's death in 569, therefore continuously promoted him, eventually becoming a high-level official and being created the Prince of Chengyang. As Lady Lu wanted to flatter one of Gao Wei's favorite concubines, Consort Mu Sheli, she volunteered to be Consort Mu's adoptive mother, and went as far as having Lu Tipo change his name to Mu Tipo.

In 571, Mu Tipo and Empress Dowager Hu's lover He Shikai, believing that Gao Wei's younger brother Gao Yan the Prince of Langye was displeased at them for their corruption, tried to reduce Gao Yan's power by having him move out of the palace. In response, Gao Yan killed He Shikai and gathered his troops, intending to kill Mu and Lady Lu as well, although he was captured when the powerful general Hulü Guang refused to support him. At the suggestion of Lady Lu and Zu Ting, Gao Wei put Gao Yan to death later that year.

By 572, both Zu and Mu were in dispute with Hulü—Zu over several instances where Hulü believed that Zu disrespected him and making disparaging remarks about Zu's being blind, and Mu over Hulü's refusal to allow him to marry one of Hulü's daughters by a concubine and Hulü's opposition to Gao Wei's granting of some public fields to Mu. That year, Zu falsely accused Hulü of treason, and Gao Wei executed Hulü and massacred almost all members of his clan. Mu's involvement in Zu's accusation is unclear, although it appeared that Mu's mother Lady Lu was involved.) After Hulü's death, Lady Lu and Mu were described as being so powerful that they were involved in all key decisions whether in government or in the palace. Mu himself was described as exceedingly corrupt and wasteful in his lifestyle, although he was also praised for being kind and not malicious to others. By 573, he, Han Zhangluan, and Gao Anagong were known as the "Three Nobles," and were in control of government. Further, by this point, Consort Mu had become empress, and she considered Lady Lu her mother and Mu Tipo her brother, making him even more honored than before. Meanwhile, Zu, trying to streamline government, was running into opposition by Mu and Lady Lu, and therefore tried to have them removed by accusing Mu's associate Wang Zichong (王子沖) of corruption, hoping to drag Mu into the case. However, Lady Lu realized what was happening and therefore suppressed the case against Wang. She then worked with Han, who also despised Zu, to have Zu expelled from government. At one point, however, both Mu Tipo and Han were removed from office over their diversion of imperial construction personnel from their project of repairing the palace at the secondary capital Jinyang (晉陽, in modern Taiyuan, Shanxi) to repairing their own homes, although Mu appeared to soon return to power.

Also in 573, rival Chen dynasty launched a major attack on Northern Qi, capturing the territory between the Yangtze River and the Huai River. Late in 573, the important city Shouyang (壽陽, in modern Lu'an, Anhui) fell into Chen hands. When news arrived, Mu and Han were gambling together, and they did not stop their gambling, only stating, "It was their land; let them take it back." (Northern Qi's predecessor state Eastern Wei had seized the territory from Chen's predecessor Liang dynasty in 549.) Further, despite the losses, Mu Tipo and Han advocated continued epicurean lifestyle on Gao Wei's and their own parts, with Mu famously stating, "Even if we lost all territory south of the Yellow River, we can still be like Qiuzi [(a city state in modern Xinjiang)]. But what is more piteous is that a human life is like borrowed time, and we should use all this short period to seek pleasure. Why worry about Shouyang?" Gao Wei agreed, and continued to spend his days feasting. (During the campaign, agrarian rebels seeking to join the Chen cause attacked Northern Xu Province (北徐州, roughly modern Linyi, Shandong), where Zu had been demoted to become the governor of, and Mu, still hating Zu, refused to send troops to aid him, hoping that the province would fall and Zu would be killed, but Zu was able to resist the rebel troops.)

In winter 576, Emperor Wu of Northern Zhou launched a major attack against Northern Qi, capturing Pingyang (平陽, in modern Linfen, Shanxi). Around the new year 577, Gao Wei led an army to try to siege and recapture Pingyang, and Emperor Wu led an army to try to lift the siege. The armies engaged, but as they did, Gao Wei's then-favorite concubine Consort Feng Xiaolian panicked and stated, "We have been defeated!" This caused Mu, attending to Gao Wei, to panic as well, and he advised Gao Wei to abandon his army. Gao Wei did and fled to Jinyang, causing the army to collapse. Gao Wei then abandoned Jinyang as well and fled back to the capital Yecheng.

== Death ==
However, instead of following Gao Wei back to Yecheng, Mu headed west and surrendered to Northern Zhou forces. When Lady Lu heard this, she committed suicide, and her family members were executed or seized as servants. Northern Zhou's Emperor Wu made Mu the governor of Yi Province (宜州, roughly modern Tongchuan, Shaanxi), and used his case as propaganda to try to get other Northern Qi officials to surrender. Later in 577, Gao Wei was captured, and Northern Qi territory was nearly all seized by Northern Zhou.

Emperor Wu initially treated Gao Wei with honor and created him the Duke of Wen, taking Gao Wei and the Gao clan members back to the Northern Zhou capital Chang'an with him. However, in winter 577, apprehensive about the Gao clan, Emperor Wu falsely accused Gao Wei and Mu Tipo of conspiring. He put Mu to death and forced Gao Wei and the other Gao clan members to commit suicide.
