= Gao Cheng =

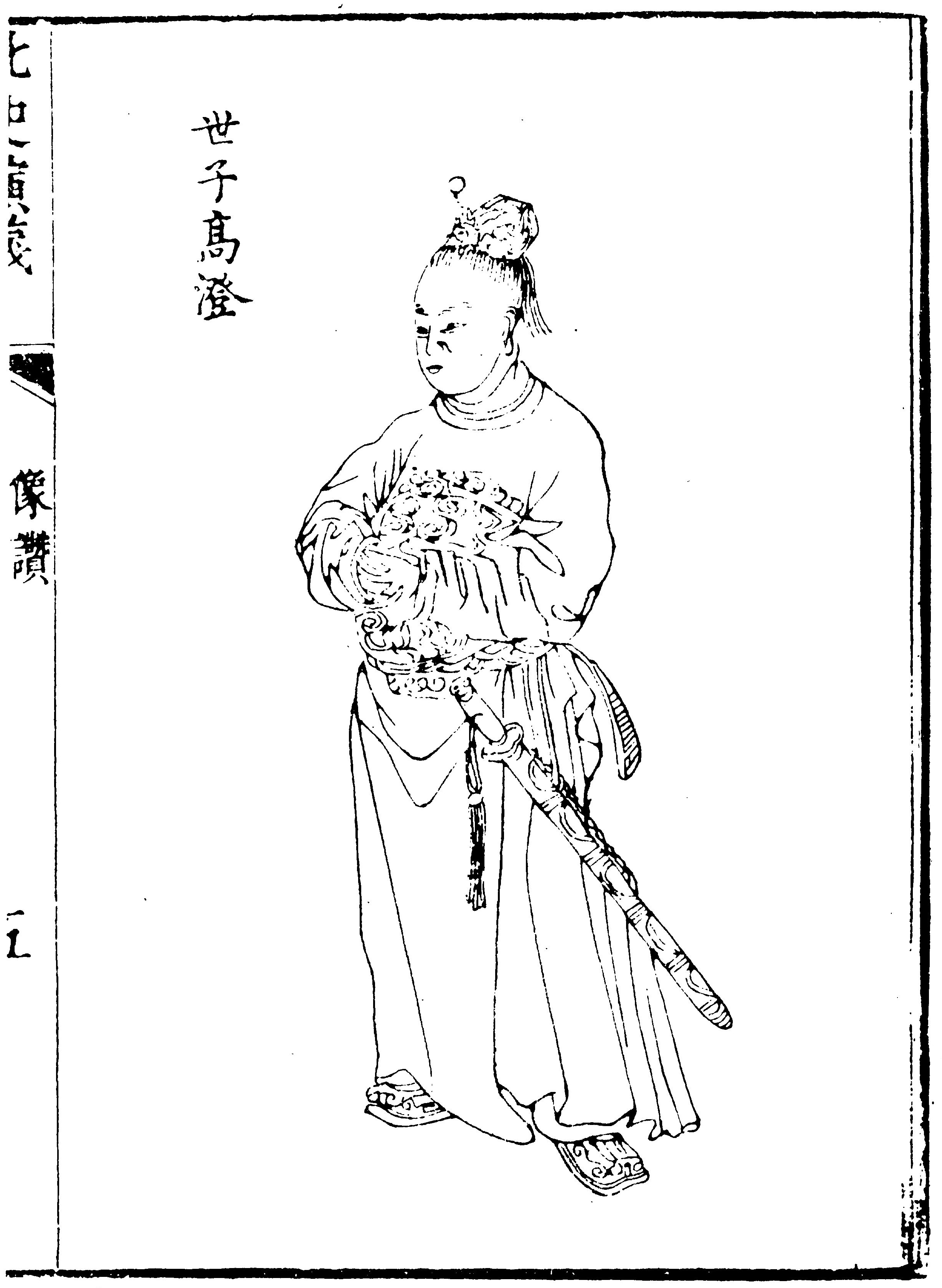

Regent of Eastern Wei
- Reign: 547 - 15 September 549
- Predecessor: Gao Huan
- Successor: Gao Yang
- Born: 521
- Died: 549 (aged 27–28)
- Spouse: Princess Fengyi
Posthumous name
- Emperor Wenxiang (文襄皇帝)
Temple name
- Shizong (世宗)
- Father: Gao Huan
- Mother: Lou Zhaojun

Gao Cheng (Chinese: 高澄; 521 – 15 September 549), courtesy name Zihui (子惠), formally Prince Wenxiang of Bohai (勃海文襄王), later further posthumously honored by Northern Qi as Emperor Wenxiang (文襄皇帝) with the temple name Shizong (世宗), was the paramount official of the Xianbei-led Eastern Wei dynasty, a branch successor state of the Northern Wei. He was Gao Huan's oldest son, and because his father wielded actual power during Emperor Xiaojing's reign, Gao Cheng also received increasingly great authority, and after his father's death in 547 took over the reign of the state. He was considered capable but frivolous and arrogant, as well as lacking in sexual discretion. In 549, he was assassinated by his servant Lan Jing (蘭京), and his younger brother Gao Yang took over the control over the Eastern Wei regime.

== Background ==
Gao Cheng was born in 521, when his father Gao Huan was still a courier of documents between the Northern Wei capital Luoyang and the old capital Pingcheng (平城, in modern Datong, Shanxi). His mother Lou Zhaojun was from a wealthy family, but Gao Huan's own household was poor. In 525, the ambitious Gao Huan joined the agrarian rebellion led by Du Luozhou (杜洛周) but subsequently became convinced that Du was not a successful leader, and sought to flee from Du's camp with his associates Wei Jing (尉景), Duan Rong (段榮), and Cai Jun (蔡雋). (Wei and Duan were also his brothers-in-law.) Lady Lou and her children (Gao Cheng and a daughter) fled as well, riding a cow. During this flight, Gao Cheng repeatedly fell off the cow, and Gao Huan considered killing him with an arrow, but Duan repeatedly saved him. The next known incident involving Gao Cheng was in 531, when Gao, then a Northern Wei general, rebelled against the members of Erzhu Rong's clan (who had dominated the political scene after they defeated Emperor Xiaozhuang in revenge of Emperor Xiaozhuang's killing of Erzhu Rong), and when an agrarian rebel leader, Gao Aocao, a very distant relative of Gao Huan's, refused to follow Gao Huan, Gao Huan sent Gao Cheng to visit Gao Aocao and showing respect due to the granduncle persuading Gao Aocao of Gao Huan's sincerity.

== During Gao Huan's lifetime ==
Gao Huan defeated the Erzhus in 532 and entered Luoyang victoriously, and he made Yuan Xiu the Prince of Pingyang emperor (as Emperor Xiaowu). As a result of Gao Huan's victory, the 11-year-old Gao Cheng received high ranking titles, even though he appeared to carry no actual responsibility by this point in either the imperial administration or his father's army. With his father having been created the Prince of Bohai, Gao Cheng, as his oldest son, also carried the title the Heir Apparent of Bohai.

In 534, Emperor Xiaowu, in a dispute with Gao Huan over the control of power, fled to the domain of the independent general Yuwen Tai, leading to a split of Northern Wei, as Gao Huan then made Yuan Shanjian the Heir Apparent of Qinghe emperor (as Emperor Xiaojing), and the areas under Gao Huan's control became known as Eastern Wei, and the areas under Yuwen's control became known as Western Wei. Gao Huan moved the Eastern Wei capital from Luoyang to Yecheng.

In 535, Gao Huan found out that Gao Cheng had been conducting an affair with Gao Huan's concubine Lady Zheng Dache (鄭大車). In anger, he caned Gao Cheng 100 times and put him under arrest, and he seriously considered making Gao You (高浟), his son by his concubine Lady Erzhu Ying'e (Erzhu Rong's daughter) heir apparent to replace Gao Cheng. Gao Cheng sought help from Gao Huan's friend Sima Ziru (司馬子如), who persuaded Gao Huan to change his mind by reminding him the contributions that Gao Cheng's mother Princess Lou had made, and also subsequently by forcing the witnesses to the affair between Gao Cheng and Lady Zheng to recant. Still, Princess Lou and Gao Cheng were forced to repeatedly bow and crawl on the ground to beg Gao Huan's forgiveness, and Gao Huan allowed Gao Cheng to remain heir apparent.

In 536, the 15-year-old Gao Cheng, who was then with his father at his military headquarters of Jinyang, requested permission to become in charge of the Eastern Wei imperial government at Yecheng. Gao Huan initially refused, but Gao Huan's assistant Sun Qian (孫搴) spoke on Gao Cheng's behalf, and finally, Gao Huan agreed. Gao Cheng soon arrived at Yecheng and took over the imperial administration. He became known as a harsh but capable enforcer of laws, in comparison to his father's policy of relaxed enforcement. He also abolished the seniority-based system of promotion that had caused the imperial administration to stagnate, seeking out capable individuals and promoting them quickly.

Around this time, Gao Cheng also married Emperor Xiaojing's sister the Princess Fengyi as his wife. In 540, they had a son, Gao Xiaowan (高孝琬). The emperor personally went to his mansion to congratulate him, and the officials all sent expensive gifts. (Gao Cheng initially declined, stating that Gao Xiaocheng was the emperor's nephew, and therefore the emperor should be congratulated first, but eventually did accept.)

In 543, the actions of Gao Cheng and his trusted assistant, Cui Xian (崔暹), would lead to the rebellion of the general Gao Zhongmi (高仲密). Gao Zhongmi had earlier married Cui's sister as his wife, but later abandoned her, and this led to hatred between Gao Zhongmi and Cui. Cui, therefore, found many reasons to pick fault with selections of officials that Gao Zhongmi had made, and Gao Cheng agreed with Cui. Further, on one occasion, when Gao Cheng saw Gao Zhongmi's new wife Li Changyi (李昌儀), he was stunned by her beauty and tried to rape her. Lady Li escaped and informed Gao Zhongmi about the incident. Therefore, when Gao Zhongmi became the governor of Northern Yu Province (北豫州, roughly modern Zhengzhou, Henan), he surrendered the capital of Northern Yu Province, the key garrison Hulao (虎牢), to Western Wei. (Gao Huan, blaming Cui for Gao Zhongmi's rebellion, initially wanted to kill Cui or at least to severely cane him. However, Gao Cheng, displaying the influence that he had on his father by this point, was able to persuade Gao Huan, through Gao Huan's assistant Chen Yuanda (陳元達), that punishing Cui would undermine Gao Cheng's authority, and therefore Gao Huan never did punish Cui.) In the ensuing battles over the control of the Hulao and Luoyang region, both Yuwen Tai and Gao Huan nearly died. After Eastern Wei forces finally captured Hulao later that year, and Lady Li was delivered to Yecheng, Gao Cheng made her one of his concubines.

In 544, Gao Huan, believing that the officials Sima Ziru, Sun Teng (孫騰), Gao Yue (高岳, Gao Huan's cousin), and Gao Longzhi (高隆之), were becoming too powerful and too corrupt, transferred major portions of those officials' responsibilities to Gao Cheng. Gao Cheng further showed off his authority by acting imperiously toward those officials. For example, when Sun once visited him and showed insufficient respect, he had his guards throw Sun on the ground and pound him with sword hilts. Gao Cheng also installed his assistant Cui Jishu (崔季舒, Cui Xian's uncle) as Emperor Xiaojing's secretary, to keep watch on Emperor Xiaojing.

Later in 544, Gao Cheng, wanting to stamp out corruption within the imperial administration, empowered Cui Xian and Song Youdao (宋遊道) to investigate high-level officials for corruption. Cui and Song each made several accusations against high-level officials, and Gao Cheng had, in particular, Sima Ziru stripped of all titles and offices, and Yuan Tan (元坦) the Prince of Xianyang stripped of his offices. In order to show that Cui, in particular, was empowered to carry out investigations, Gao Cheng had Cui intentionally show disrespect to himself in public with impunity, so that the officials would be even more apprehensive of Cui.

In late 546, Gao Huan became seriously ill, and he summoned Gao Cheng back to Jinyang to entrust the matters to him. At that time, Gao Cheng was apprehensive that the general Hou Jing, who commanded the provinces south of the Yellow River, would rebel, and Gao Huan left him a list of officials that he could trust, and specifically instructed him to make Murong Shaozong the commander of the army against Hou if Hou rebelled. Gao Huan died in spring 547, but Gao Cheng, also pursuant to Gao Huan's instructions, did not announce Gao Huan's death in public; rather, he returned to Yecheng, pretending that Gao Huan was still alive.

== As regent ==
Also in spring 547, Hou Jing, unsure whether Gao Huan was still alive but believing that Gao Huan had died, rebelled, first surrendering the 13 provinces he commanded to Western Wei, and then to Liang Dynasty. Gao Cheng initially sent Han Gui (韓軌) against Hou, and Han had some successes against Hou's forces but was forced to withdraw when Western Wei forces arrived, taking four of Hou's provinces in exchange for supporting Hou. Subsequently, Hou broke with Western Wei, and Western Wei forces withdrew. Meanwhile, Emperor Wu of Liang commissioned his nephew Xiao Yuanming the Marquess of Zhenyang with a large force to try to aid Hou. Gao Cheng, after finally revealing Gao Huan's death, put Murong Shaozong in charge of the army. He also made peace overtures to Hou, promising to keep him in command of the southern provinces if he would submit. Hou refused.

Meanwhile, Gao Cheng also had a threat from within. Gao Cheng, once Gao Huan died, began to show contempt for Emperor Xiaojing, and once, when Emperor Xiaojing rebuked him for public disrespect, Gao Cheng ordered Cui Jishu to punch Emperor Xiaojing three times. Emperor Xiaojing, fearful of what might come next, formed a conspiracy against Gao Cheng. In winter 547, the plot was discovered, and Gao Cheng put the emperor under arrest and executed his coconspirators.

Late in 547, Murong Shaozong crushed Xiao Yuanming's army at Hanshan (寒山, in modern Xuzhou, Jiangsu), capturing Xiao Yuanming. When Xiao Yuanming was delivered to Gao Cheng, Gao Cheng treated him with respect, intending to try to use Xiao Yuanming as a pawn against Hou. By spring 548, Murong Shaozong had crushed Hou's army as well, and Hou fled to Liang, seizing the Liang border city of Shouyang (壽陽, in modern Lu'an, Anhui) as his base of operations. Gao Cheng then began negotiating peace with Liang's Emperor Wu, intending to create instability in the relationship between Emperor Wu and Hou. Hou, eventually coming to believe that Emperor Wu would betray him and turn him over to Eastern Wei to exchange for Xiao Yuanming, rebelled in fall 548, eventually capturing the Liang capital Jiankang and holding Emperor Wu and then his successor Emperor Jianwen of Liang as puppets. Once Hou did so, he made an overture of peace to Gao Cheng, but Gao Cheng did not respond.

Meanwhile, Gao Cheng was trying to recapture the provinces that Western Wei had taken from Hou. Also in 548, he sent Gao Yue and Murong Shaozong to siege Changshe (長社, in modern Xuchang, Henan), but Changshe, defended by the Western Wei general Wang Sizheng, would not fall easily, and during the battle, Western Wei forces were able to kill Murong Shaozong and another major general, Liu Fengsheng (劉豐生). In summer 549, Gao Cheng himself commanded reinforcements and arrived at Changshe. He intensified the siege, and soon, Changshe fell, and he captured Wang, whom he treated with respect. After Changshe fell, Western Wei forces also withdrew from the three other provinces that they had captured, and Eastern Wei by this time had recaptured all of the lands that Hou had initially taken.

== Death ==
Meanwhile, Gao Cheng was beginning to confer with his associates on how he could seize the throne. In fall 549, he was in a meeting with Chen Yuankang, Cui Jishu, and Yang Yin, discussing the procedure for doing so. One of the attending servants was Lan Jing (蘭京), a son of the Liang general Lan Qin, whom he had captured in battle and had repeatedly refused to release despite both Lan Qin's and Lan Jing's pleas to allow Lan Qin to ransom his son. During the meeting, Lan Jing delivered a meal to Gao Cheng and the others at the meeting. When Lan Jing stepped out, Gao Cheng made the comment, "Last night, I dreamed that this slave was using a sword to hit me. I should kill him." Lan Jing overheard the comment, and he reentered the room and killed Gao Cheng with a knife, despite Chen's attempts to protect Gao Cheng.

== Family ==
Parents

- Father : Gao Huan, Prince Xianwu of Qi (齊獻武王), posthumously granted the title of Emperor Shenwu (神武皇帝)
- Mother: Empress Wuming (武明皇后), of the Lou clan (婁氏), personal name Zhaojun (昭君)

Consorts and issue

- Empress Wenxiang (文襄皇后), of the Yuan clan (元氏), sister of Emperor Xiaojing of Eastern Wei
  - Gao Xiaowan (高孝琬) (b. 541), the Prince of Hejian ( 541–566), fourth son
  - Princess Le'an (乐安公主, d.577), first daughter
    - Married Cui Dana (崔达拏), a son of Cui Xian (崔暹)
  - Princess (公主), second daughter
- Princess Ruru (蠕蠕公主), of the Yujiulü clan (郁久閭氏), daughter of Khan Yujiulü Anagui, originally the second wife of Gao Huan
  - Princess (公主), third daughter
- Lady ?, of the Yuan clan (元氏), personal name Yuyi (玉儀), the Princess Langxie (琅邪公主), granddaughter of Yuan Yong
- Lady, of the Yuan clan (元氏), personal name Jingyi (靜儀), Yuan Yuyi's sister, granddaughter of Yuan Yong
- Lady, of the Song clan (宋氏)
  - Gao Xiaoyu (高孝瑜) (536 – 2 August 563) Prince Kangshu of Henan, first son
- Lady, of the Wang clan (王氏)
  - Gao Xiaoheng (高孝珩), the Prince of Guangning (d.577), second son
- Lady, of the Chen clan (陈氏)
  - Gao Yanzong (高延宗), the Prince of Ande (544 –577), fifth son
- Lady, of the Yan clan (燕氏)
  - Gao Shaoxin (高紹信), the Prince of Yuyang (b.540), sixth son
- Lady, of a certain clan (不详)
  - Gao Changgong (高長恭), Prince Wu of Lanling (541 – 573), third son
- Palace Lady Li, of the Li clan (宮人李), personal name Changyi (昌

== Notes and references ==
- Book of Northern Qi, vols. 3 , 11 .
- History of Northern Dynasties, vol. 6 .
- Zizhi Tongjian, vols. 155, 157, 158, 159, 160, 161, 162.
