= Emperor Xiaojing of Eastern Wei =

Emperor of Eastern Wei from 534 to 550

Emperor Xiaojing of Eastern Wei 東魏孝靜帝

Emperor of Eastern Wei
- Reign: 8 November 534 – 7 June 550
- Regent: Gao Huan (534–547); Gao Cheng (547–549); Gao Yang (549–550)
- Born: 524
- Died: 552 (aged 27–28)
- Spouse: Empress Gao
Names
- Family name: Yuán (元); Given name: Shànjiàn (善見)
Era dates
- Tiān píng (天平) 534–537; Yuán xiàng (元象) 538–539; Xīng hé (興和) 539–542; Wǔ dìng (武定) 543–550
Posthumous name
- Emperor Xiàojìng (孝靜皇帝, lit. "filial and meek")
- House: Yuan
- Dynasty: Eastern Wei
- Father: Yuan Dan, Prince Wenxuan of Qinghe
- Mother: Consort Hu

Emperor Xiaojing of Eastern Wei ((東)魏孝靜帝) (524 – 21 January 552 (Note: jiyou day of the 12th month of the 2nd year of the Tianbao era of the reign of Emperor Wenxuan of Northern Qi, per Emperor Xiaojing's biography in Book of Wei. Vol.164 of Zizhi Tongjian recorded the same month of death, but indicated the year as the 2nd year of the Dabao era of the reign of Emperor Jianwen of Liang; the month corresponds to 12 Jan to 10 Feb 552 in the Julian calendar.)), personal name Yuan Shanjian (元善見), was the founder and the only emperor of China's Eastern Wei dynasty. In 534, Emperor Xiaowu of Northern Wei had fled the capital Luoyang to reestablish the imperial government at Chang'an. Northern Wei's paramount general Gao Huan made Emperor Xiaojing emperor as Emperor Xiaowu's replacement. Gao Huan moved the capital from Luoyang to Yecheng, thus dividing Northern Wei into two. Emperor Xiaojing's state became known as Eastern Wei. Although Gao Huan treated him with respect, real power was in the hands of Gao Huan, and after Gao Huan's death, his sons Gao Cheng and Gao Yang. In 550, Gao Yang forced Emperor Xiaojing to yield the throne to him, ending the Eastern Wei and establishing the Northern Qi dynasty. Around the new year 552, the former Emperor Xiaojing was poisoned to death on the orders of the new emperor.

== Background ==
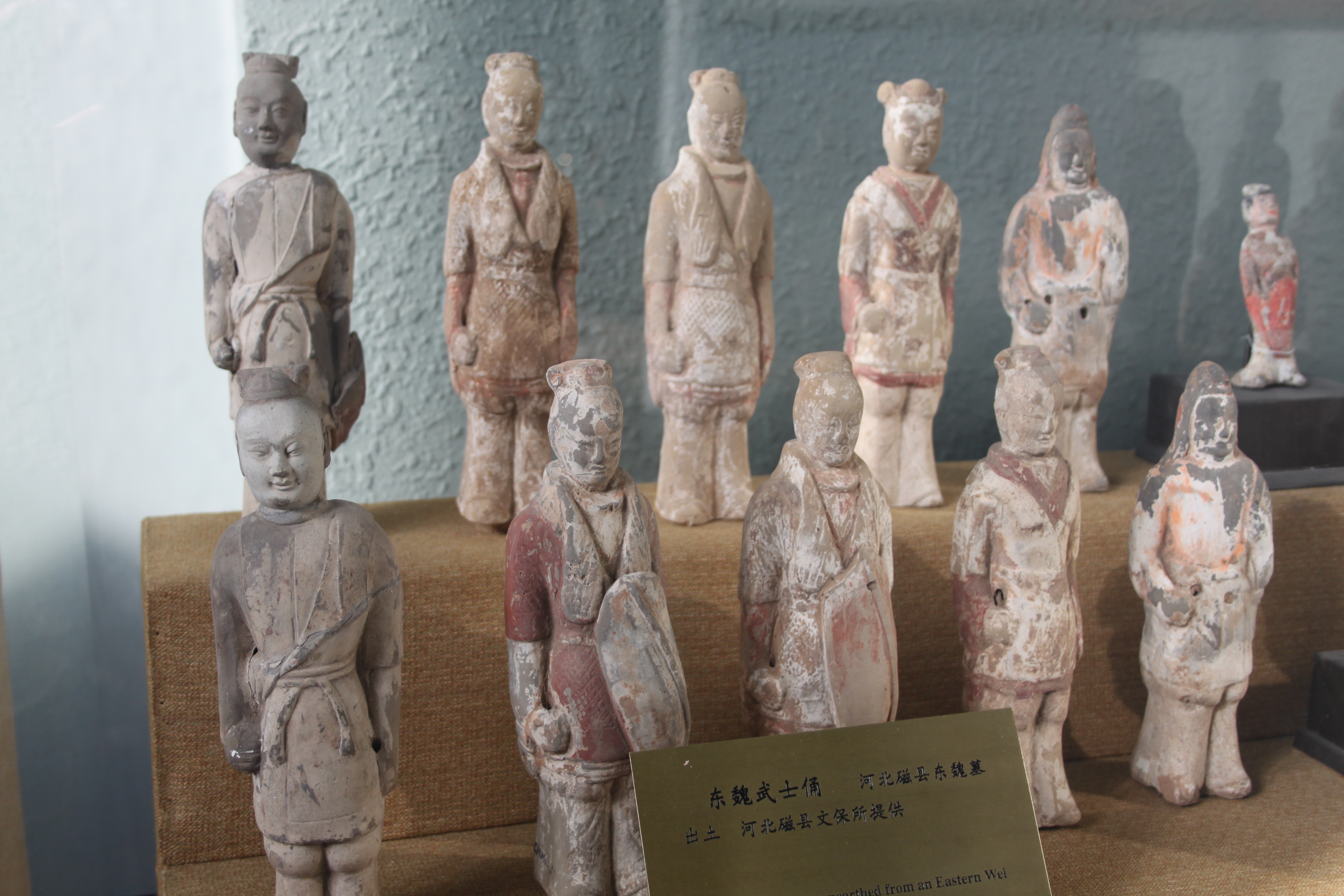
Eastern Wei soldiers

Yuan Shanjian was born in 524. His father Yuan Dan (元亶) the Prince of Qinghe was a son of the well-regarded Yuan Yi (元懌), Prince Wenxian of Qinghe and a son of Emperor Xiaowen. His mother Princess Hu was Yuan Dan's wife and was a granddaughter of Hu Zhen (胡真), an uncle of Emperor Xiaoming's mother Empress Dowager Hu. Yuan Shanjian was Yuan Dan's oldest son, and was his heir apparent.

In 534, Emperor Xiaowu, a cousin of Yuan Shanjian's father Yuan Dan, seeking to resist the control of the paramount general Gao Huan, entered into an alliance with independent generals Yuwen Tai and Heba Sheng. When Gao, in response, marched toward the capital Luoyang, Emperor Xiaowu fled to Yuwen's territory. Yuan Dan initially joined Emperor Xiaowu on his flight, but quickly abandoned Emperor Xiaowu and returned to Luoyang. After Gao entered Luoyang, he had Yuan Dan assume acting imperial powers, and Yuan Dan began to become arrogant, viewing himself as the next emperor. Gao, who was in fact looking for a new emperor to replace Emperor Xiaowu, felt that Yuan Dan was inappropriate, and therefore, under the excuse that a cousin should not succeed another, chose Yuan Shanjian and declared him emperor (as Emperor Xiaojing). (Note: Yuan Dan, in embarrassment and fear, tried to flee south, presumably to the rival Liang Dynasty, but Gao tracked him down and brought him back to Luoyang.) This formally divided Northern Wei into Eastern Wei (with Emperor Xiaojing as emperor) and Western Wei (with Emperor Xiaowu as Emperor).

== During Gao Huan's lifetime ==
Gao Huan, believing that Luoyang was too close to the borders of Western Wei and Liang, moved the capital to Yecheng, an important city firmly under his control. Viewing Emperor Xiaowu's flight as a blot on his person, Gao publicly showed Emperor Xiaojing the utmost respect for the rest of his life, and Gao's subordinates did not dare not to follow suit, although actual authority rested in the hands of Gao and other officials Gao delegated authority to. Gao also made repeated attempts to conquer Western Wei to reunify Northern Wei, but each time was repelled by Yuwen Tai or other Western Wei generals. Gao mostly remained at his headquarters in Jinyang (晉陽, in modern Taiyuan, Shanxi), but made occasional visits to Yecheng. In 536, Gao put his son, Gao Cheng, in charge of the Eastern Wei government. Late that year, Emperor Xiaojing's father Yuan Dan died, and according to some historians (but not all), Gao assassinated him.

Emperor Xiaojing, as he grew, was described to be handsome and strong, capable of jumping over a fence while holding a stone lion. He was also said to be skillful at horseriding, archery, and literature. People compared him to his famed ancestor, Emperor Xiaowen.

In 539, Emperor Xiaojing took Gao Huan's second daughter as his empress.

In 544, Gao Cheng, wanting to place a trusted official to keep watch on Emperor Xiaojing, made his associate Cui Jishu (崔季舒) Emperor Xiaojing's secretary. However, Emperor Xiaojing had a cordial relationship with Cui, who often revised submissions Gao made to Emperor Xiaojing and edicts Emperor Xiaojing issued to Gao Huan and Gao Cheng, to improve the style and content. Emperor Xiaojing frequently made the comment, "Cui is my wet nurse."

In 545, pursuant to Gao Huan's request, Emperor Xiaojing took the cousin of the khan of Tuyuhun, Murong Kualü (慕容夸呂), as a concubine, to try to enhance the relationship with Tuyuhun.

In 547, Gao Huan died, and Gao Cheng took over full power of the government.

== During Gao Cheng's regency ==
In light of Gao Huan's death, the general Hou Jing, who did not respect Gao Cheng, first surrendered the 13 provinces he controlled (Note: the region between the Huai River and Yellow River) to Western Wei, and then to Liang. Gao Cheng's general Murong Shaozong, however, defeated both Xiao Yuanming – nephew of Liang's Emperor Wu, whom Emperor Wu sent to assist Hou – and Hou, capturing Xiao Yuanming and forcing Hou to flee to Liang. By 548, all but four provinces (which Western Wei took) were back under Eastern Wei control, and by 549, Eastern Wei had recaptured those provinces as well, after Gao Cheng captured Changshe (長社, in modern Xuchang, Henan).

Meanwhile, during the campaign against Hou, a conflict between Gao Cheng and Emperor Xiaojing would erupt. Gao Cheng was not as respectful to the emperor as Gao Huan was, and he ordered Cui Jishu to intensify his surveillance of the emperor. On one occasion, when Gao Cheng was attending a feast, he flashed a cup before the emperor as a toast – a very disrespectful gesture, as a subordinate, when toasting the emperor, was supposed to kneel. Emperor Xiaojing became angry, and remarked, "There is no such thing as an everlasting empire, and do we (朕) (Note: In Chinese, the character "朕" [zhen] is the pronoun used by the emperor to refer to himself; it is akin to the usage of the Royal we in English.) even need to live!" Gao Cheng angrily responded, "We (朕), we, we of dog feet!" He ordered Cui to punch the emperor three times, and then left abruptly. Emperor Xiaojing thereafter entered into a conspiracy with his teacher Xun Ji (荀濟), Yuan Jin (元瑾), Liu Siyi (劉思逸), Yuan Daqi (元大器) the Prince of Huashan, Yuan Xuanhong (元宣洪) the Prince of Huainan, and Yuan Hui (元徽) the Prince of Jibei to consider overthrowing Gao Cheng. They dug a tunnel from within the palace to the outside of the city, intending to create a secret passage for imperial guards to go through, but the tunnel was discovered, and Gao Cheng entered the palace with his troops, arresting Emperor Xiaojing. The Book of Wei records that when Gao Cheng saw the emperor, he yelled "Your majesty, why would you rebel?" (陛下何意反邪). Upon realizing the mistake in his choice of wording, he fell on his knees and asked for forgiveness. Nonetheless, he eventually put Emperor Xiaojing under house arrest, and executed several leading participants of the conspiracy.

In spring 549, Emperor Xiaojing was forced to create Gao Cheng the greater title of Prince of Qi, and give him the honorific office of Xiangguo (相國), both signifying a move toward Gao's taking of the throne. Gao Cheng formally declined these honors, and further made a formal request for the emperor to create a son as crown prince. Subsequently, in fall 549, Emperor Xiaojing created his son Yuan Zhangren (元長仁) crown prince. (Note: It is not known whether Yuan Zhangren's mother was Empress Gao.)

Also in fall 549, Gao Cheng was meeting Chen Yuankang (陳元康), Yang Yin, and Cui Jishu, to secretly discuss the timeframe in which to take the throne, when his servant Lan Jing (蘭京) – a son of the Liang general Lan Qin Gao Cheng captured in battle, and whom Gao Cheng had repeatedly threatened to kill – assassinated Gao Cheng and Chen. Gao Cheng's brother Gao Yang the Duke of Taiyuan, who was also in Yecheng at the time, killed Lan Jing and his associates, and publicly declared only that Gao Cheng had been wounded. Emperor Xiaojing, however, believed that Gao Cheng was dead, and secretly made the remark, "It is heaven's will that the Grand Marshal (Note: 大將軍 (Dà Jiāngjūn); Gao Cheng's title at the time) is dead. The power to rule should return to the imperial clan."

== During Gao Yang's regency ==
Gao Yang, however, quickly moved to consolidate power. He made a quick show of force, marching his personal guards of 8,000 men into the palace, and stating to Emperor Xiaojing that he was going to Jinyang – where the military headquarters were. Emperor Xiaojing, seeing Gao Yang's intent on keeping power, turned pale and stated, "This man does not appear any more tolerant of me. I do not know when I will die." Gao Yang set up his headquarters in Jinyang, intending to control the military, and in spring 550, Gao Yang had Emperor Xiaojing create him the Prince of Qi Commandery – a slightly lesser title than the one that his brother declined before his death. Just two months later, Gao Yang's title was changed to Prince of Qi.

Meanwhile, Gao Yang's associate Gao Dezheng (高德政) was trying to persuade him to seize the throne. In summer 550, Gao Yang agreed, and he started advancing toward Yecheng, while sending Gao Dezheng to Yecheng to try to force the issue. Emperor Xiaojing bestowed Gao Yang the nine bestowments – the traditional penultimate step before abdication. After Gao Yang arrived in Yecheng, with the officials Pan Le (潘樂), Zhang Liang (張亮), and Zhao Yanshen (趙彥深) sent by Gao Yang to request his abdication, Emperor Xiaojing did so, yielding the throne to Gao Yang, who established Northern Qi (as its Emperor Wenxuan).

== After removal from power ==
The new Emperor Wenxuan created the former emperor the Prince of Zhongshan on 10 June 550, and gave him the special treatment of not having to declare himself a subject of the new emperor. He created his sister, the former empress, the Princess Taiyuan. The former emperor resided with the princess, and the princess, worried that her brother might do her husband harm, kept close watch on her husband, often tasting his food to make sure that it was not poisoned.

However, Emperor Wenxuan was apprehensive of the former emperor. Around the new year 552, Emperor Wenxuan invited the Princess Taiyuan to a feast inside the palace. As soon as she left her residence, Emperor Wenxuan sent assassins to force the former emperor to drink poisoned wine, and also killed his three sons. Emperor Wenxuan gave the former emperor the posthumous name of Xiaojing, and also buried him with imperial honors. However, at a later time, for reasons unknown, Emperor Wenxuan opened up the tomb and threw Emperor Xiaojing's casket into the Zhang River (漳水).

== Family ==
Parents:

- Father: Yuan Dan (元亶) (d. 536), Prince Wenxuan of Qinghe, son of Yuan Yi (元懌) Prince Wenxian of Qinghe, son of Emperor Xiaowen of Northern Wei
- Mother: Princess Hu, Yuan Dan's wife

Consort and their respective issue(s);

- Empress Gao, of the Gao clan (高皇后), second daughter of Gao Huan
  - Yuan Zhangren, Crown Prince (皇太子 元长仁; 524 – 552)
- Consort Murong, of Tuyuhun's clan (容华嫔 吐谷浑氏), cousin of Murong Kualü (慕容夸呂)
- Consort Li, of the Li clan (李氏, d. 574) (Note: Later, she became a concubine of Emperor Wucheng of Northern Qi.)
- Furen, of the Hu clan (胡夫人)
- Unknown:
  - Two other sons, also killed by Emperor Wenxuan of Northern Qi 552

== Notes ==
Chinese royalty
Preceded by Emperor Xiaowu of Northern Wei	Emperor Xiaowu of Northern Wei; 534–550	Dynasty ended
Preceded by Emperor Xiaowu of Northern Wei	Emperor of China (Northern/Central); 534–550	Succeeded by Emperor Wenxuan of Northern Qi
