= Western Wei =

Imperial dynasty of China that followed the disintegration of the Northern Wei

Wei 魏
- 535–557 AD
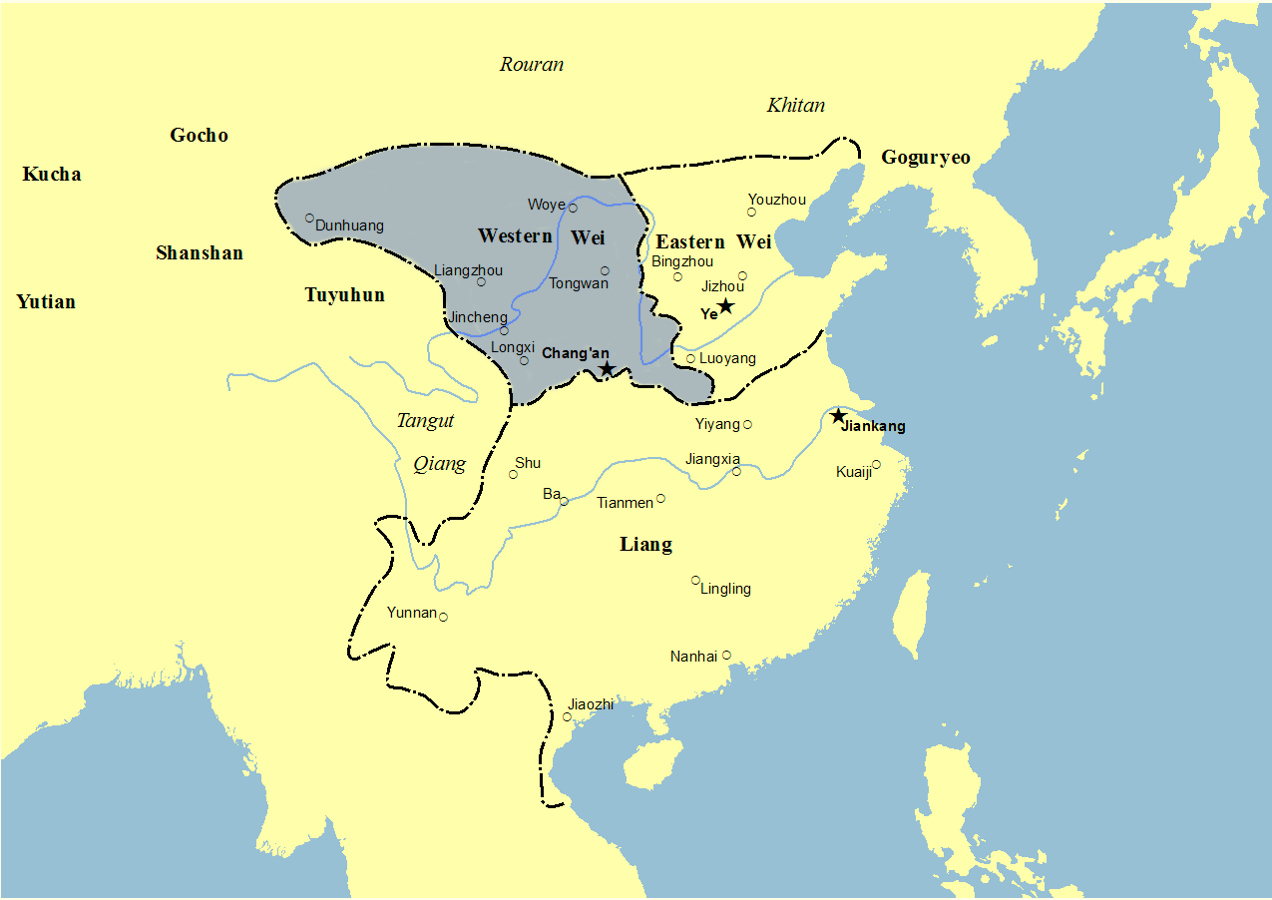
- Western Wei and neighbors
- Capital: Chang'an
- Government: Monarchy
  - 535–551: Emperor Wen of Western Wei
  - 552–554: Emperor Fei of Western Wei
  - 554–557: Emperor Gong of Western Wei
- Historical era: Southern and Northern Dynasties
  - Establishment of Eastern Wei, start of division of Northern Wei: 8 November 534
  - Emperor Wen's ascension, often viewed as establishment: 18 February 535
  - Disestablished: 14 February 557 AD
- Currency: Chinese coin, Chinese cash
Preceded by	Succeeded by
Northern Wei; Liang Dynasty	Northern Zhou
- Today part of: China

Wei (/weɪ/), known in historiography as the Western Wei (Chinese: 西魏; pinyin: Xī Wèi), was an imperial dynasty of China that followed the disintegration of the Northern Wei. One of the Northern dynasties during the era of the Northern and Southern dynasties, it ruled the western part of northern China from 535 to 557 AD. As with the Northern Wei dynasty that preceded it, the ruling family of the Western Wei were members of the Tuoba clan of the Xianbei.

== History ==
After the Xianbei general Yuwen Tai killed the Northern Wei emperor Yuan Xiu, he installed Yuan Baoju as emperor of Western Wei while Yuwen Tai would remain as the virtual ruler. Although smaller than the Eastern Wei in territory and population, Western Wei was able to withstand the attacks from the eastern empire, most notably at the Battle of Shayuan in 537. Due to its better economical conditions, Western Wei was even able to conquer the whole western part of the Liang empire in the south and occupied the territory of modern Sichuan. In 557 Yuwen Tai's nephew Yuwen Hu deposed Emperor Gong and placed Yuwen Tai's son Yuwen Jue on the throne, ending Western Wei and establishing Northern Zhou.

Marital alliances with the nascent Turkic Empire also took place, as Bumin Qaghan (r.552), first khagan of the Göktürks, married the Western Wei princess Changle in June 551, before he was able to unite his tribes and revolt against the Rouran Empire, thereby establishing the First Turkic Khaganate in 552.

== Religion and art ==
Buddhism and Buddhist art flourished under the Western Wei, even though the dynasty only lasted twenty-two years. Western Wei caves opened at Dunhuang and Maijishan.

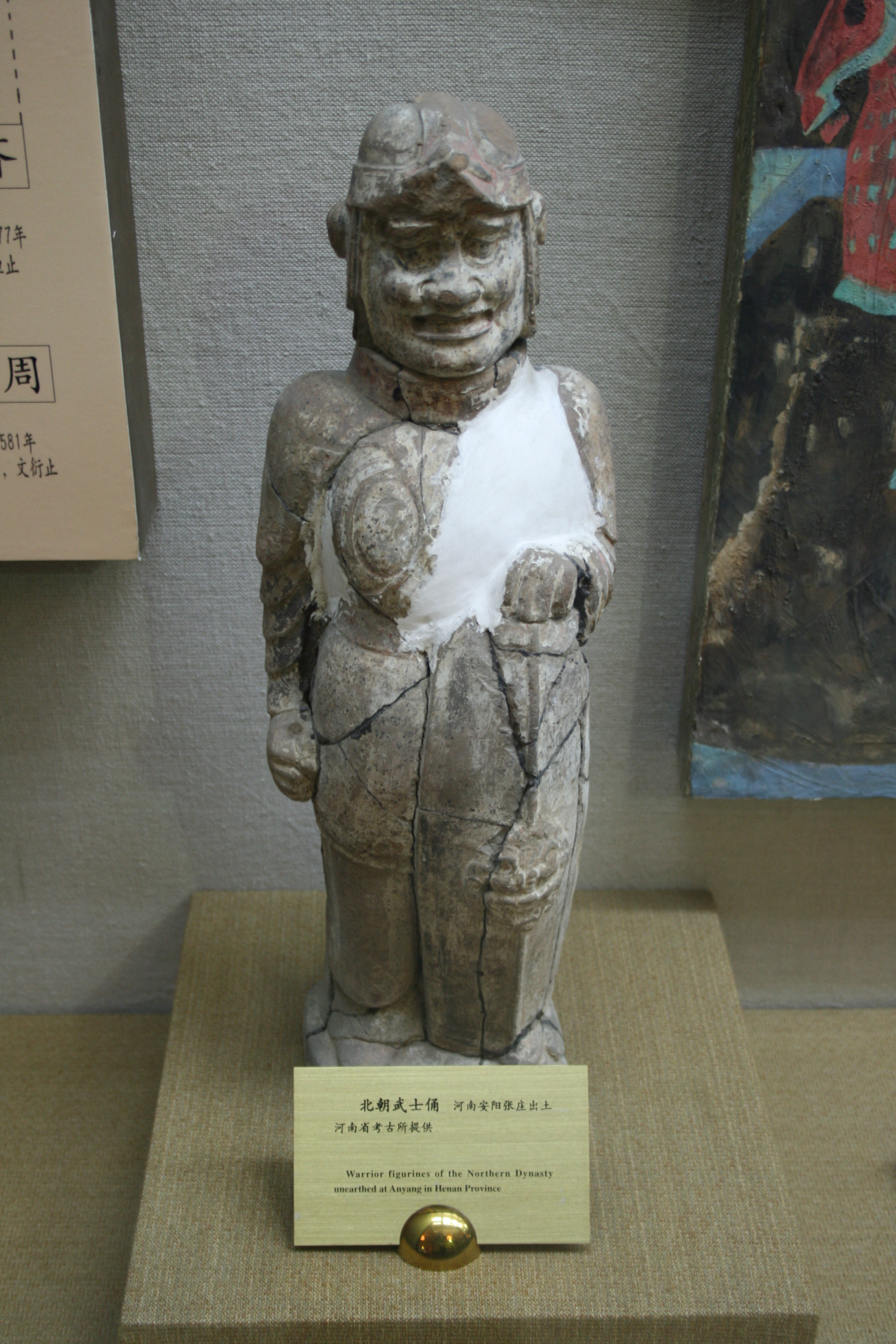
Northern dynasties shieldbearer

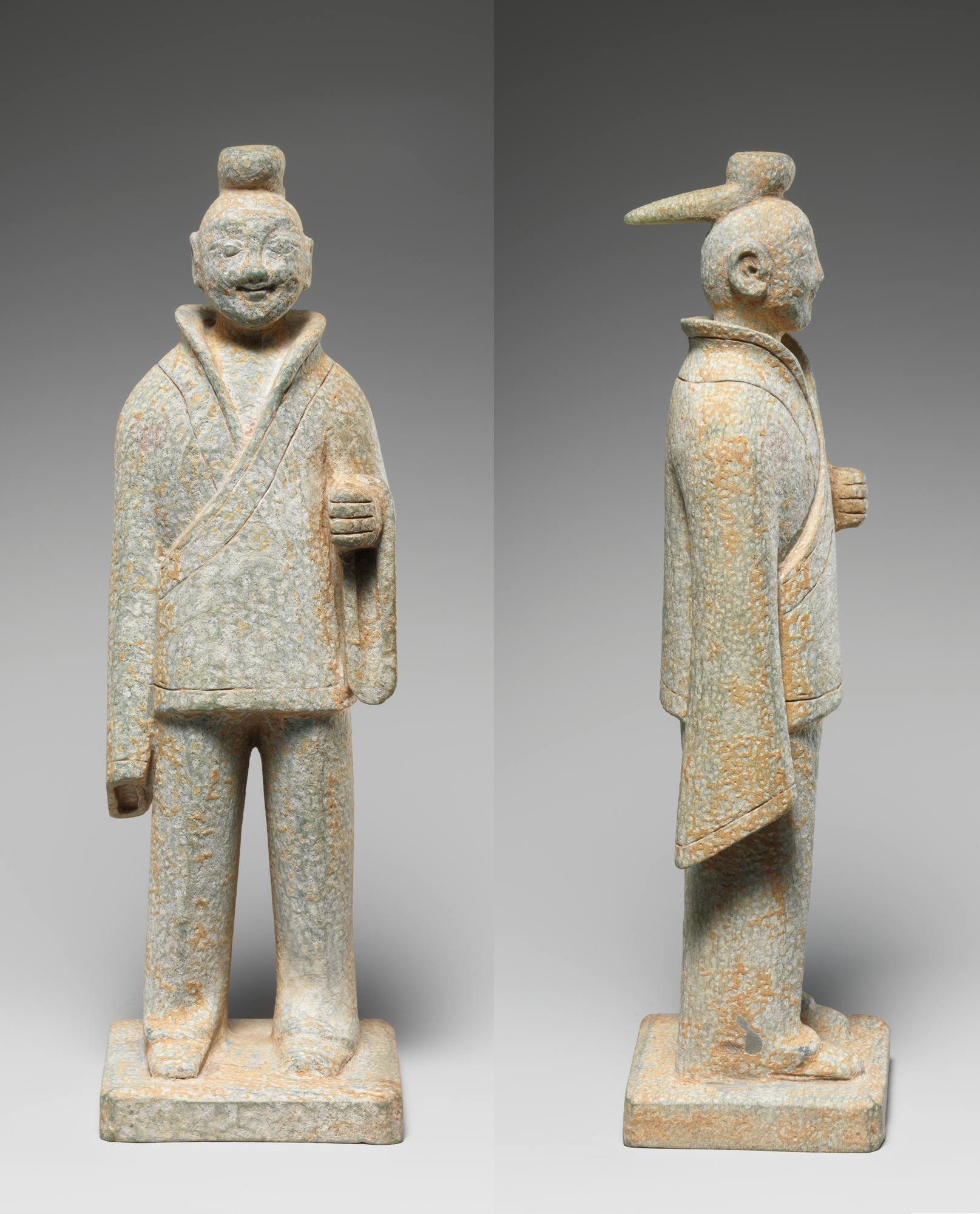
Western Wei civil officer (535–557)

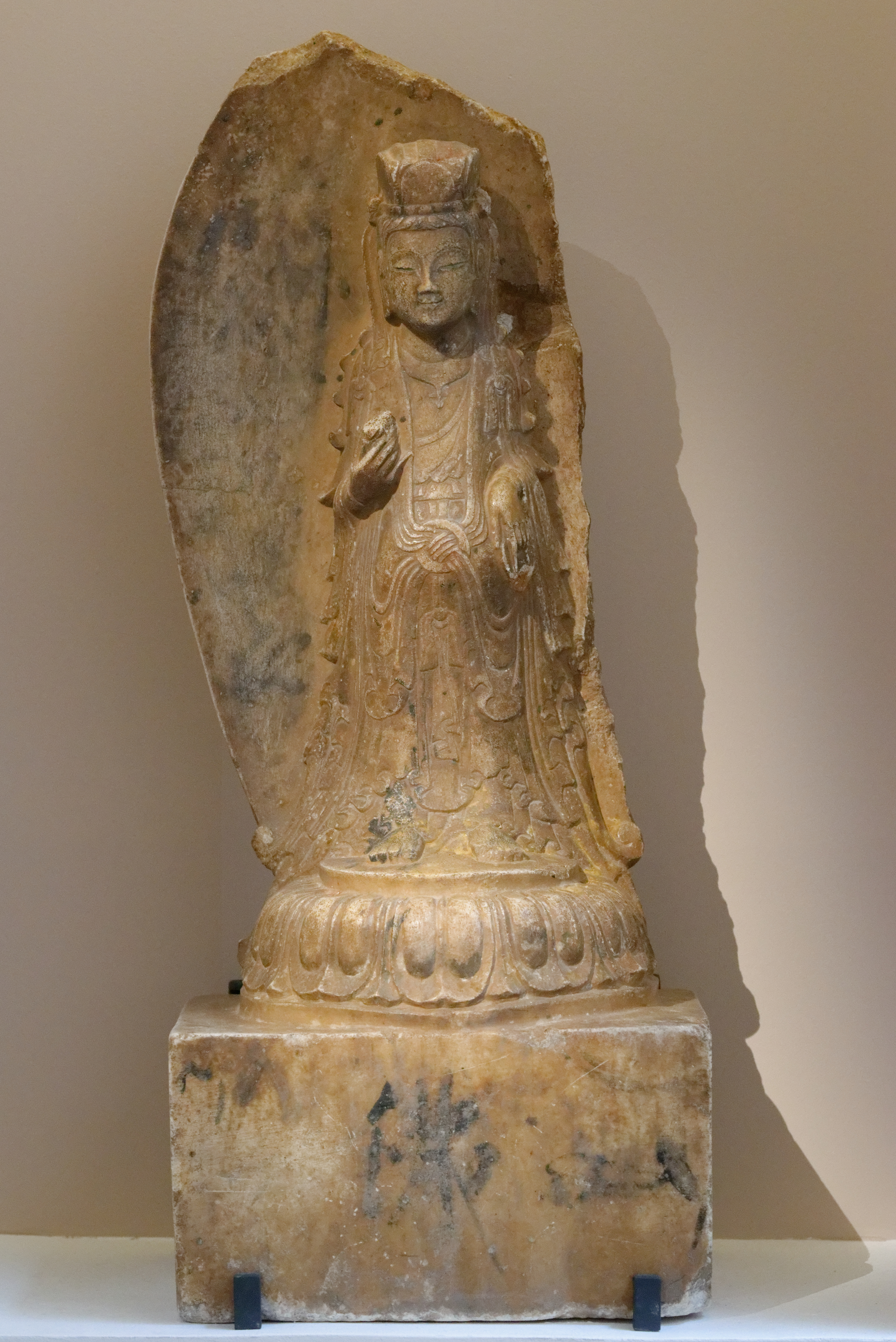
Bodhisattva Avalokiteśvara, Western Wei, Musée Guimet

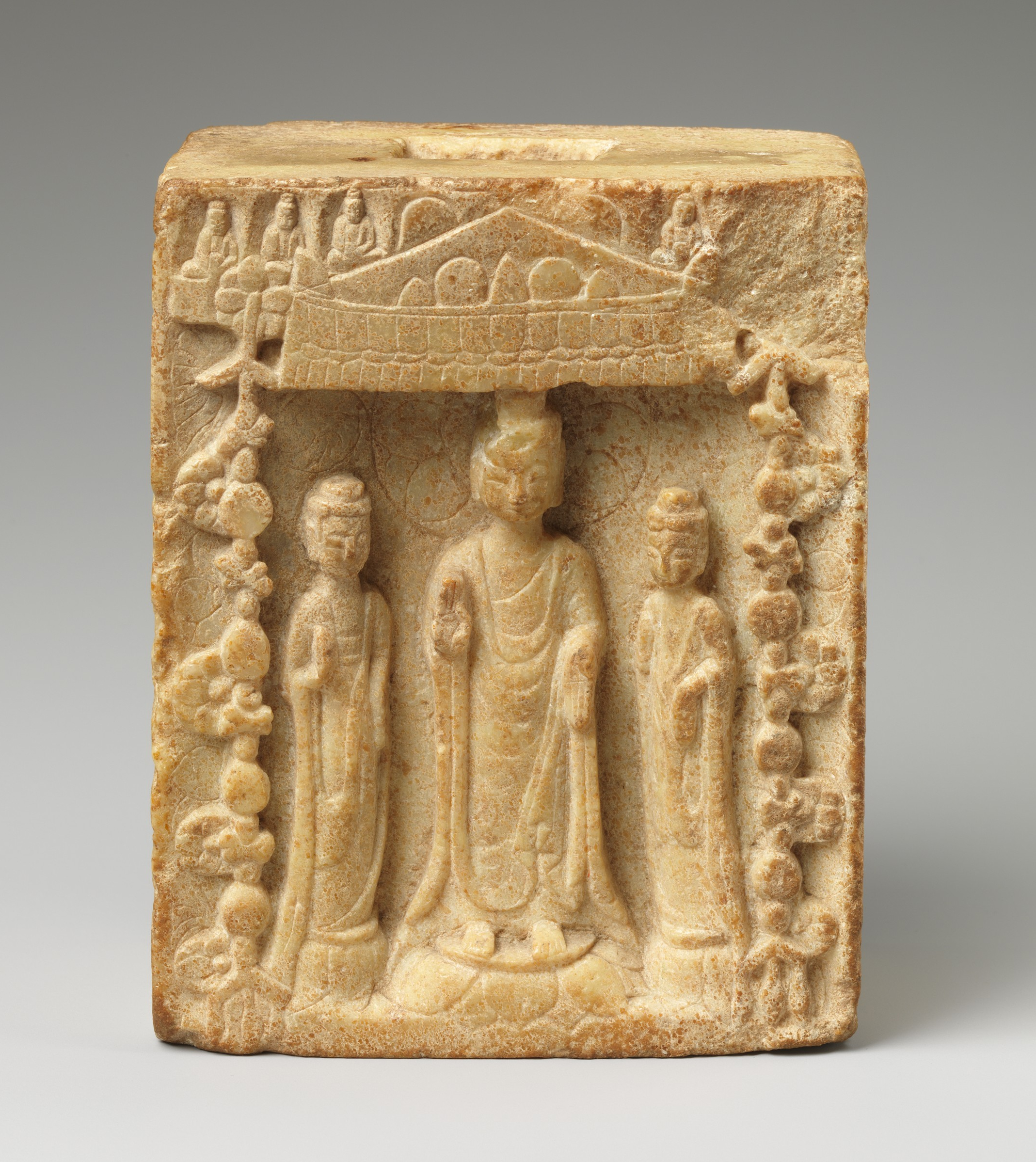
Section of a Pagoda-Shaped Stele (Western Wei or Northern Zhou), mid-6th century CE

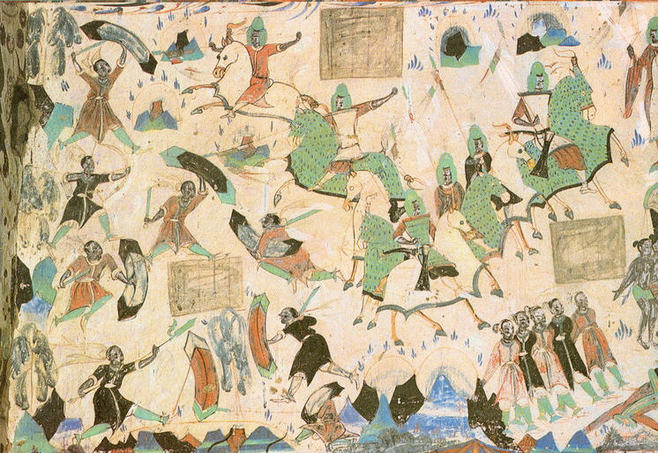
Story of the Five Hundred Robbers (535–557 CE), Mogao Caves, Cave 285, Dunhuang, Western Wei period

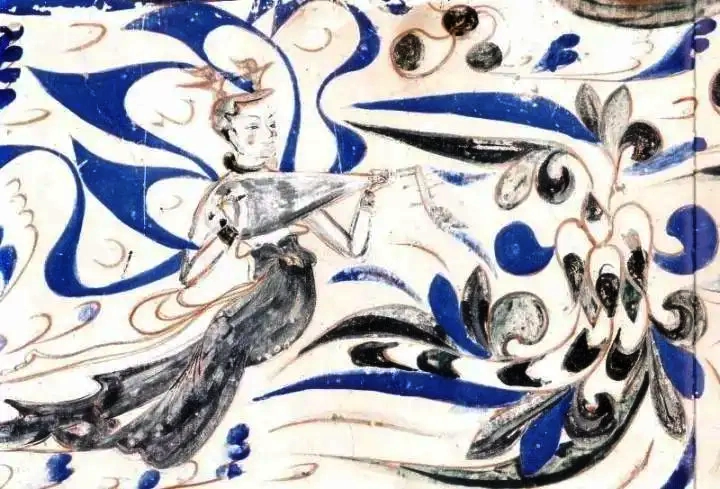
An apsara plays a pipa in Mogao Caves, Cave 285, Western Wei period.

== Rulers ==
Posthumous Name	Personal Name	Period of Reign	Era Name
Emperor Wen of Western Wei	Yuan Baoju	535–551	Datong (大統) 535–551
Emperor Fei of Western Wei	Yuan Qin	551–554	–
Emperor Gong of Western Wei	Tuoba Kuo	554–557	–

== See also ==
- Monarchy of China
