= Eastern Wei =

Imperial dynasty of China that followed the disintegration of the Northern Wei dynasty

Wei 魏
- 534–550 AD
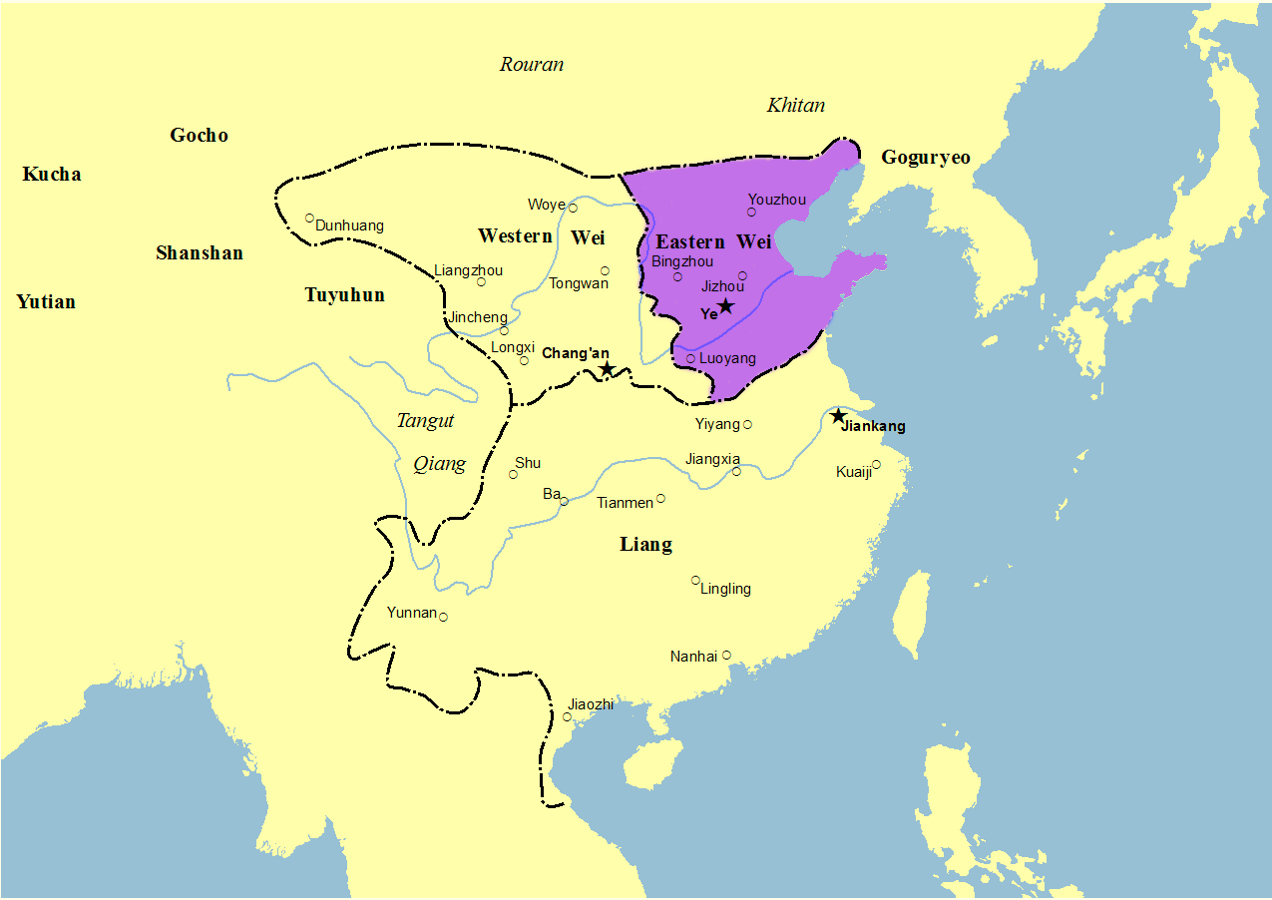
- Eastern Wei and neighbors
- Capital: Luoyang (534); Yecheng (534–550)
- Government: Monarchy
- Emperor
  - 534–550: Emperor Xiaojing of Eastern Wei
- History
  - Established: 8 November 534
  - Disestablished: 7 June 550 AD
- Currency: Chinese coin Chinese cash
Preceded by	Succeeded by
Northern Wei	Northern Qi
- Today part of: China

Wei (/weɪ/), known in historiography as the Eastern Wei (simplified Chinese: 东魏; traditional Chinese: 東魏; pinyin: Dōng Wèi), was an imperial dynasty of China that followed the disintegration of the Northern Wei dynasty. One of the Northern dynasties during the Northern and Southern dynasties period, the Eastern Wei ruled the eastern part of northern China from 534 to 550 AD. As with the Northern Wei, the ruling family of the Eastern Wei were members of the Tuoba clan of the Xianbei.

== History ==
Gao Huan was the potentate of the eastern half of what was Northern Wei territory. In 534, following the disintegration of the Northern Wei dynasty, he installed Yuan Shanjian as ruler of Eastern Wei. Yuan Shanjian was a descendant of the Northern Wei imperial family, and was installed as a puppet ruler, as the real power lay in the hands of Gao Huan. Several military campaigns, such as the Battle of Shayuan, were launched against the neighboring Western Wei in an attempt to reunify the territory once held by the Northern Wei. However, these campaigns were not successful. In 547, Gao Huan died. His sons Gao Cheng and Gao Yang were able to pursue his policy of controlling the emperor, but in 550 Gao Yang deposed Yuan Shanjian and founded his dynasty, the Northern Qi.

== Art ==
The Buddhist art of the Eastern Wei displays a combination of Greco-Buddhist influences from Gandhara and Central Asia (representations of flying figures holding wreaths, Greek-style folds of the drapery), together with Chinese artistic influences.

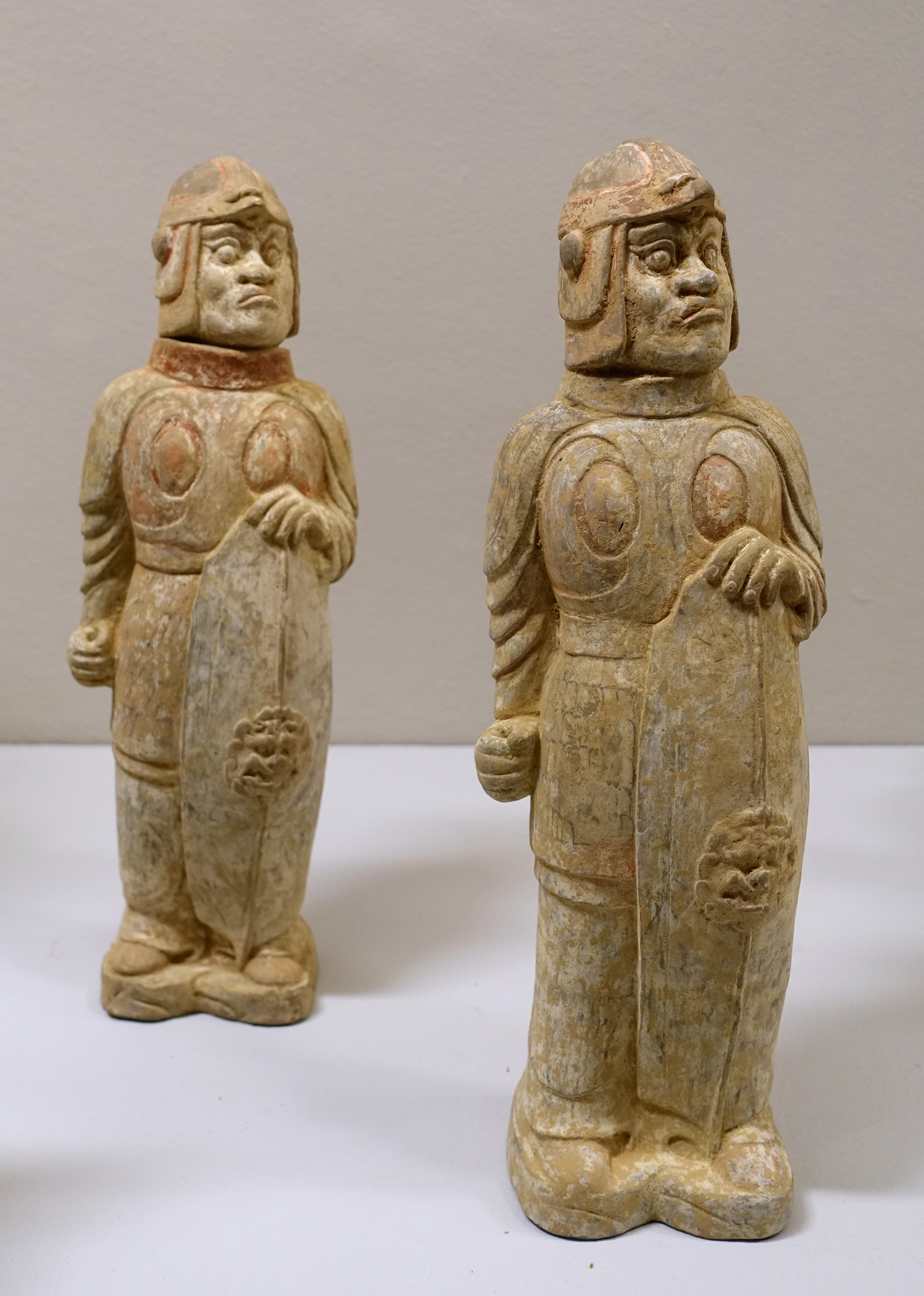
Armored warriors, China, Eastern Wei dynasty, 534–550 AD

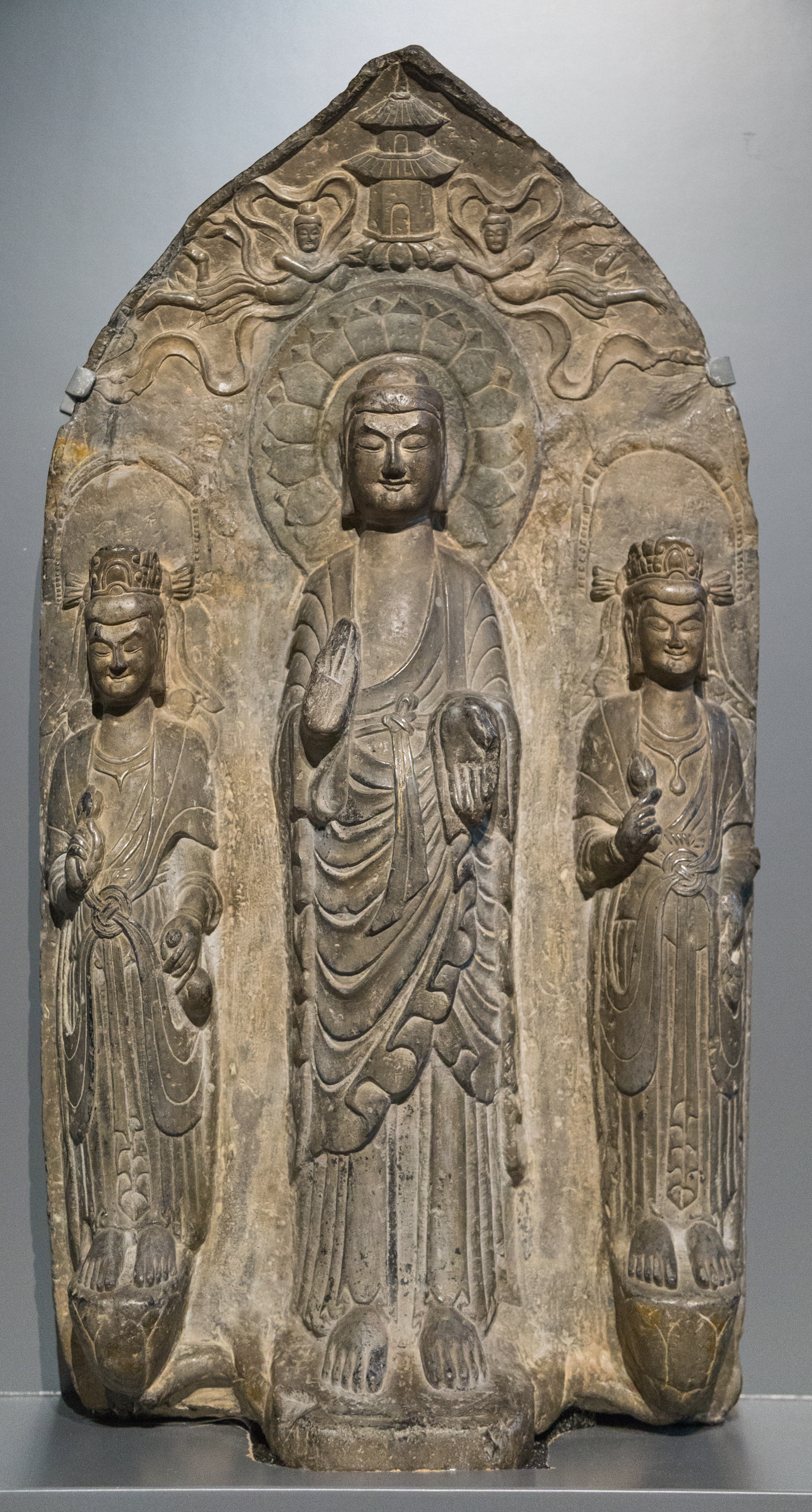
Eastern Wei Buddhist triad

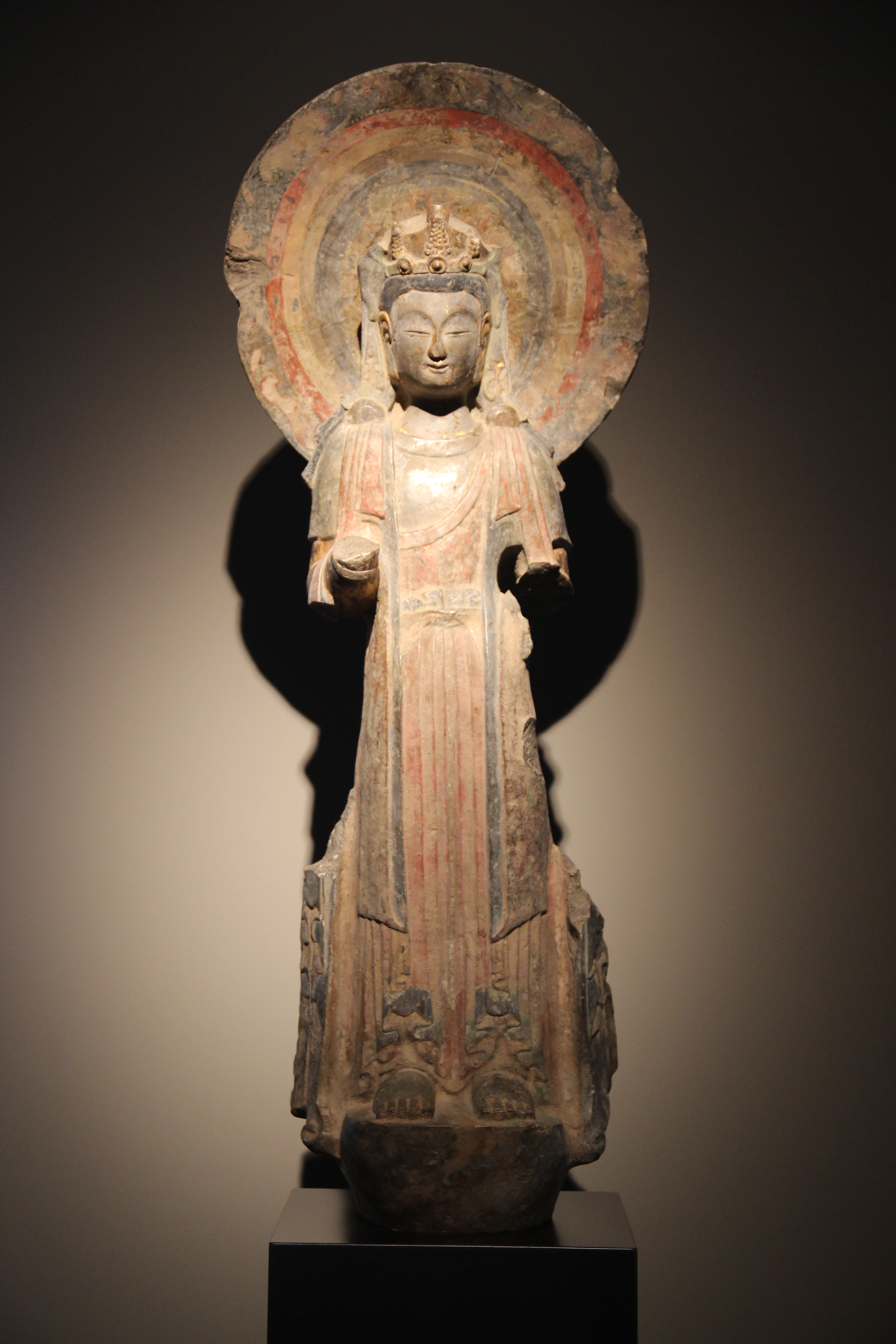
Eastern Wei Limestone Bodhisattva

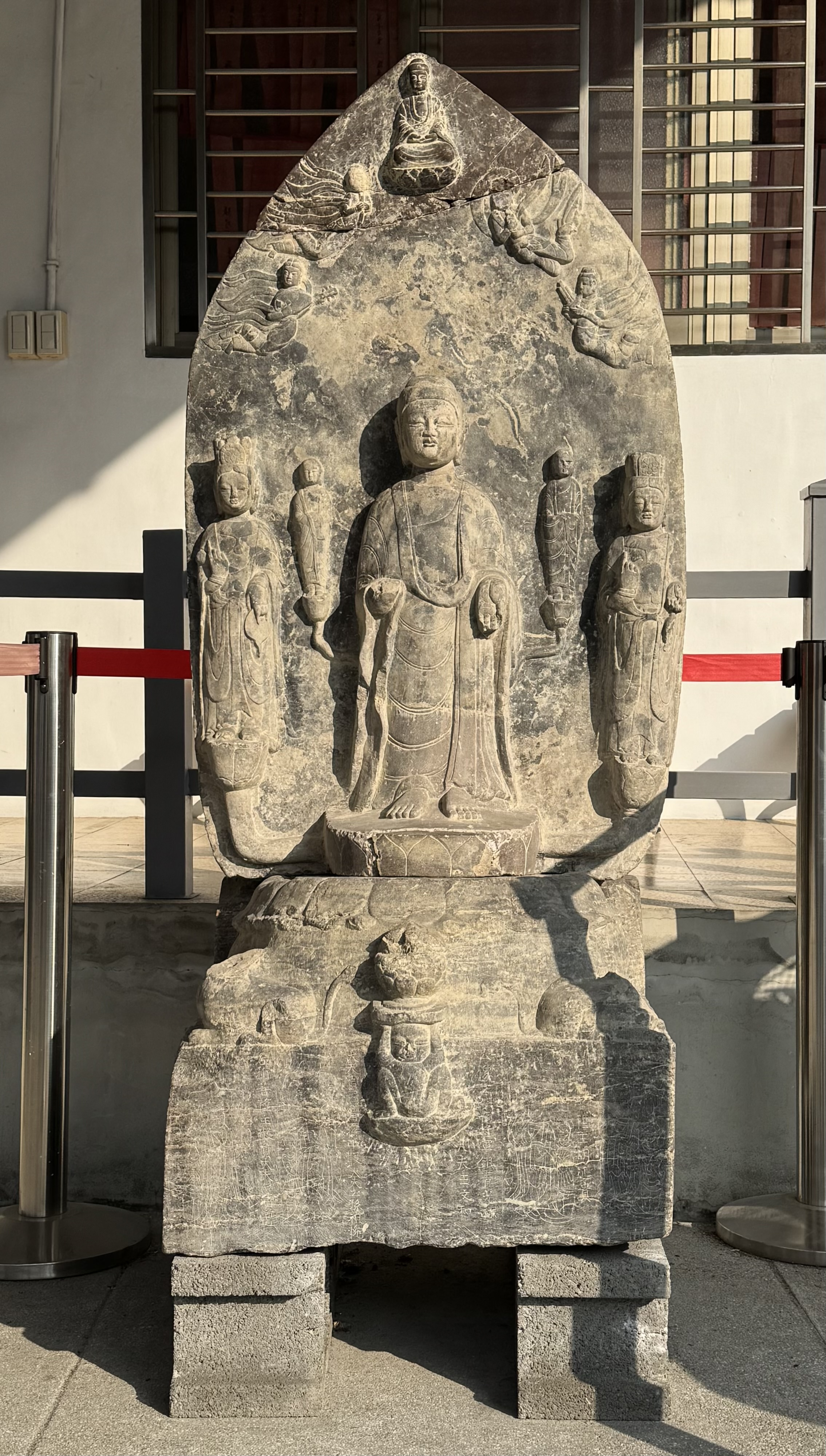
Eastern Wei Buddhist sculpture on the temple yards of Linji Huguo Chan Temple in Taipei: Lord Buddha with Two Bodhisattvas, Two Disciples and Four Flying Heavenly Beings
