= Empress Dowager Hu =

Empress Dowager Hu (胡太后) may refer to:

- Empress Dowager Hu (Northern Wei) (died 528), empress dowager of the Northern Wei dynasty
- Empress Dowager Hu (Northern Qi) (fl. 556–577), empress dowager of the Northern Qi dynasty

== See also ==
- Empress Hu (disambiguation)
