= Empress Hu =

Empress Hu (胡皇后) may refer to:

- Empress Dowager Hu (Northern Wei) (died 528), consort and empress dowager of the Northern Wei dynasty, Emperor Xuanwu's concubine and Emperor Xiaoming's mother
- Empress Hu (Yuan Xu's wife) (fl. 528), empress of the Northern Wei dynasty, Emperor Xiaoming's wife
- Empress Dowager Hu (Northern Qi) (fl. 556–577), consort and empress dowager of the Northern Qi dynasty, Gao Dan's wife and Gao Wei's mother
- Empress Hu (Gao Wei's wife) (fl. 571–578), empress of the Northern Qi dynasty, Gao Wei's wife
- Empress Hu (Xuande) (died 1443), empress of the Ming dynasty
