= 452 =

452 in various calendars
Gregorian calendar	452; CDLII
Ab urbe condita	1205
Assyrian calendar	5202
Balinese saka calendar	373–374
Bengali calendar	−142 – −141
Berber calendar	1402
Buddhist calendar	996
Burmese calendar	−186
Byzantine calendar	5960–5961
Chinese calendar	辛卯年 (Metal Rabbit); 3149 or 2942 — to — 壬辰年 (Water Dragon); 3150 or 2943
Coptic calendar	168–169
Discordian calendar	1618
Ethiopian calendar	444–445
Hebrew calendar	4212–4213
- Hindu calendars
Vikram Samvat	508–509
Shaka Samvat	373–374
Kali Yuga	3552–3553
Holocene calendar	10452
Iranian calendar	170 BP – 169 BP
Islamic calendar	175 BH – 174 BH
Javanese calendar	337–338
Julian calendar	452; CDLII
Korean calendar	2785
Minguo calendar	1460 before ROC 民前1460年
Nanakshahi calendar	−1016
Seleucid era	763/764 AG
Thai solar calendar	994–995
Tibetan calendar	ལྕགས་མོ་ཡོས་ལོ་ (female Iron-Hare); 578 or 197 or −575 — to — ཆུ་ཕོ་འབྲུག་ལོ་ (male Water-Dragon); 579 or 198 or −574

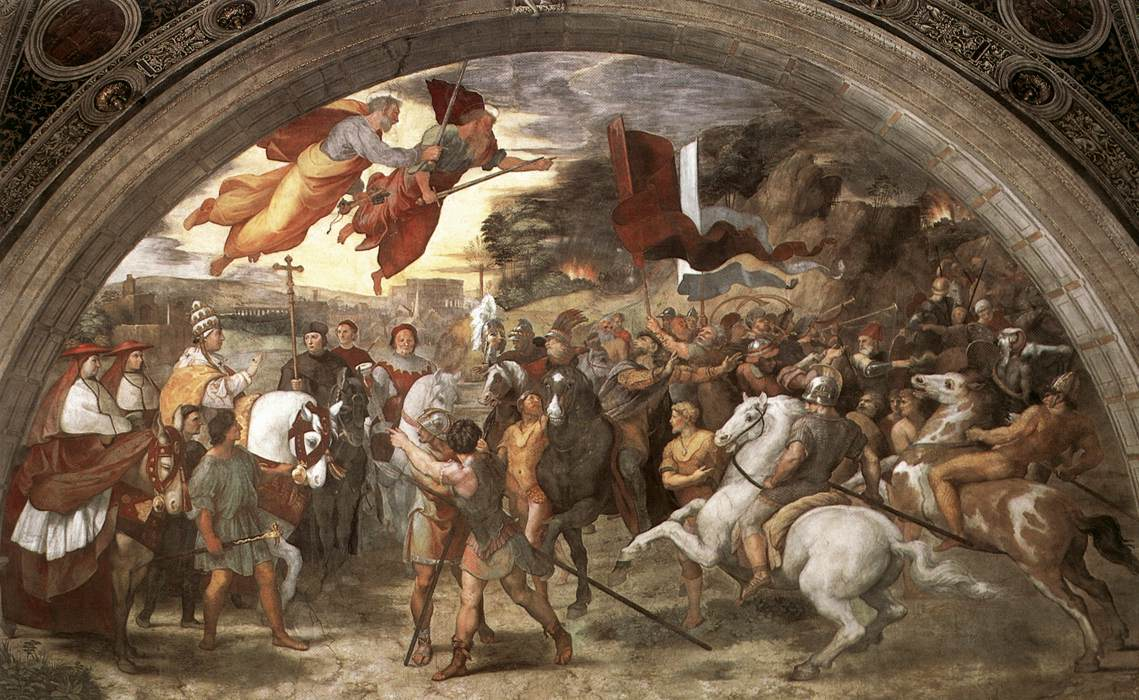
Meeting between pope Leo I and Attila, by Raphael

Year 452 (CDLII) was a leap year starting on Tuesday of the Julian calendar. At the time, it was known as the Year of the Consulship of Herculanus and Sporacius (or, less frequently, year 1205 Ab urbe condita). The denomination 452 for this year has been used since the early medieval period, when the Anno Domini calendar era became the prevalent method in Europe for naming years.

== Events ==
=== By place ===
==== Europe ====
- The Huns under Attila invade Northern Italy. Emperor Valentinian III flees from Ravenna to Rome, and sends Pope Leo I to persuade Attila to return to the Hungarian Plain. The cities of Aquileia, Padua and Verona are destroyed by the Huns. Milan is saved because Attila is offered a huge amount of gold. Flavius Aetius (magister militum) is unable to raise a new army against him.
- Rome is threatened by Attila but not attacked, due to a last-minute effort by Leo I. Threatened by news of reinforcements from the Eastern Roman Empire and the plague breaking out among the Huns, Attila is persuaded to withdraw.
- The city of Venice is founded by fugitives from Attila's army who flee to small islands in the Venetian Lagoon.

==== China ====
- Nan'an Yinwang succeeds his father Emperor Taiwu of Northern Wei, after he is assassinated by the eunuch Zong Ai. Later this year, Yinwang is murdered as well, and Ai is overthrown by a group of high officials. Wencheng Di, age 12, becomes the new emperor of Northern Wei.

=== By topic ===
==== Arts and Sciences ====
- Last known usage of Demotic script in Egypt.

== Births ==
- Gundobad, king of the Burgundians (approximate date)
- John the Silent, bishop and Saint (died 558)
- Qi Mingdi, emperor of Southern Qi (d. 498)
- Wang Jian, official of Liu Song and Southern Qi (d. 489)

== Deaths ==
- March 11 – Tai Wu Di, emperor of Northern Wei (b. 408)
- Drest I, king of the Picts (approximate date)
- Nan'an Yinwang, emperor of Northern Wei
- Yujiulü, consort and wife of Tuoba Huang
- Zong Ai, eunuch and high official
