= Yuan He =

Yuan He (源賀) (407 – October 22, 479), né Tufa Poqiang (禿髮破羌), Xianbei name Hedouba (賀豆跋), formally Prince Xuan of Longxi (隴西宣王), was a high-ranking official of the Xianbei-led Northern Wei dynasty of China. He was a son of Southern Liang's last prince Tufa Rutan, and after Southern Liang's destruction he fled to Northern Wei and began to serve as an official, gradually reaching positions of great power during the reigns of Emperor Wencheng and Emperor Xianwen.

== Background ==
Tufa Poqiang was born in 407, 5 years after his father Tufa Rutan had become Southern Liang's prince. After Southern Liang was destroyed by Western Qin in 414, Tufa He appeared to have, along with his father and most of his family, surrendered to Western Qin's prince Qifu Chipan. After his older brother Tufa Hutai (禿髮虎台) and sister Princess Tufa (Qifu Chipan's wife) were executed in 423, after their failed plot to assassinate Qifu Chipan, Tufa Poqiang, along with a number of his brothers and other relatives, first fled to Northern Liang, and then to Northern Wei. He was created the Marquess of Xiping, and Emperor Mingyuan was particularly amazed at his talents. Because the Tufa clan and Emperor Mingyuan's Tuoba clan traced their lines to a common ancestor, Emperor Mingyuan changed Tufa Poquiang's surname to Yuan (源), meaning "origin."

== During Emperor Mingyuan's and Emperor Taiwu's reigns ==
Tufa Poqiang, now named Yuan Poqiang, soon became a Northern Wei general. Because he was able to defeat a number of rebellious tribes, he received repeated promotions.

When Emperor Mingyuan's son Emperor Taiwu made a major attack on Northern Liang in 439, intending to destroy it and annex its territory, Yuan was his guide. Yuan was able to persuade a number of Xianbei tribes, which had been subjects of his grandfather Tufa Sifujian (禿髮思復犍), to submit to the Northern Wei army, greatly helping Northern Wei forces with their food supplies during the successful siege of Northern Liang's capital Guzang (姑臧, in modern Wuwei, Gansu). For his contributions, Yuan's title was upgraded to Duke of Xiping. He appeared to be uninvolved in the subsequent rebellion by his brother Tufa Baozhou (禿髮保周), and he was not punished on account of Tufa Baozhou's rebellion. He followed Emperor Taiwu on campaigns against Rouran and the Lushuihu rebel Gai Wu (蓋吳), and he often was on the frontlines, not fearing for his own safety. Emperor Taiwu warned him against being overly aggressive, and changed his personal name from Poqiang (meaning "defeat the Qiang") to He (meaning "congratulations"), believing the name to fit better.

After Emperor Taiwu was assassinated by the eunuch Zong Ai in 452, Zong initially made Emperor Taiwu's son Tuoba Yu the Prince of Nan'an emperor, and then assassinated Tuoba Yu as well. Yuan He started a coup d'état, in alliance with other officials Dugu Ni (獨孤尼), Baba Kehou (拔拔渴侯), and Buliugu Li, and overthrew Zong, placing Emperor Taiwu's pre-deceased crown prince Tuoba Huang's son Tuoba Jun on the throne as Emperor Wencheng.

== During Emperor Wencheng's reign ==
As one of the officials who were responsible for Emperor Wencheng's becoming emperor, Yuan He was exceedingly trusted by the emperor, and during the internecine struggles between imperial officials during Emperor Wencheng's early reign, he not only did not suffer but prospered. His title was upgraded to Prince of Xiping. On one occasion in 452, Emperor Wencheng told him to take whatever reward he wished from the imperial treasury, and he declined on account that the imperial treasury needed to conserve in order to be able to fight Liu Song and Rouran. When Emperor Wencheng insisted, he only took one warhorse. It was also around that time that, based on Yuan He's suggestion, the Northern Wei laws were made slightly more lenient; previously, accused treasonous persons' male relatives were all executed as well, and under Yuan He's proposal, the law was changed that those males under 12 would not be executed but only be made slaves.

In winter 456, Yuan He's title was changed to Prince of Longxi, and he was made the governor of Ji Province (冀州, modern central Hebei), and around this time, he made the further criminal law reform proposal that those who were sentenced to death, other than those charged with treason or murder, would have their sentences commuted to exile to and military service on the northern borders (with Rouran) or southern borders (with Liu Song) to assist with the state's defense. Emperor Wencheng accepted his proposal. When a man named Shi Hua (石華) subsequently accused Yuan of treason, Emperor Wencheng quickly personally guaranteed that Yuan did not commit treason, and Shi was exposed as a false accuser and executed.

== During Emperor Xianwen's reign ==
After Yuan served as the governor of Ji Province for seven years, in 466, he was recalled to the capital Pingcheng (平城, in modern Datong, Shanxi) and promoted to being the commander of the armed forces, although his actual power at this time was unclear, for historical accounts did not make many references to him. At this time, Emperor Wencheng had already died in 465 and was succeeded by his young son Emperor Xianwen, with Emperor Wencheng's wife Empress Feng serving as regent. In 470, Yuan was one of the generals for a major attack that Emperor Xianwen, who had by then assumed imperial powers, made against Rouran.

In 471, Emperor Xianwen, who favored philosophical discussions and did not want to be emperor much longer, considered passing the throne to his uncle Tuoba Zitui (拓跋子推) the Prince of Jingzhao, and he called an imperial council meeting to discuss the matter. At that time, Yuan was commanding the troops to defend against a Rouran attack, but Emperor Xianwen recalled him to Pingcheng to join the discussion. Yuan opposed Emperor Xianwen's idea of passing the throne to Tuoba Zitui, concurring with another uncle of Emperor Xianwen, Tuoba Yun (拓跋雲) the Prince of Rencheng that passing the throne to an uncle would be a violation of the proper order of succession, and that if Emperor Xianwen wanted to leave the throne, the proper successor would be the crown prince Tuoba Hong (different character than Emperor Xianwen). After further discussion, Emperor Xianwen agreed and passed the throne to the four-year-old Tuoba Hong, who took the throne as Emperor Xiaowen, although Emperor Xianwen, as Taishang Huang (retired emperor), remained in actual power.

== During Emperor Xiaowen's reign ==
In 474, Yuan He was relieved of his post as commander of the armed forces on account of his illness. He never returned to serve in the imperial administration, and he died in 479. By that time, Emperor Xianwen himself had died, but Emperor Xiaowen and Grand Empress Dowager Feng, in a show of great respect for Yuan, bestowed many burial items that were reserved for emperors, and had Yuan buried near the past emperors.

== Descendants ==
- Yuan Yan (源延)
  - Yuan Lin (源鳞)
- Yuan Huai (源怀), né Yuan Sili (源思礼)
  - Yuan Gui (源规), courtesy name Lingdu (灵度)
    - Yuan Su (源肃)
      - Yuan Shao (源绍)
        - Yuan Wenyuan (源文远)
  - Yuan Rong (源荣), courtesy name Lingbing (灵并)
  - Yuan Hui (源徽), courtesy name Lingzuo (灵祚)
  - Yuan Xuanliang (源玄谅), heir to his uncle Yuan Huan
  - Yuan Ziyong (源子雍), courtesy name Linghe (灵和)
    - Yuan Yanbo (源延伯)
      - Yuan Xiaosun (源孝孙)
    - Yuan Shize (源士则), died young
    - Yuan Shizheng (源士正), killed
    - Yuan Shigui (源士规), killed
    - Yuan Kai (源楷), courtesy name Shizhi (士质), infant name Nayan (那延)
  - Yuan Zigong (源子恭), courtesy name Lingshun (灵顺). Ancestor of Tang dynasty chancellor Yuan Qianyao
    - Yuan Biao (源彪), courtesy name Wenzong (文宗)
    - Yuan Wenyao (源文瑶)
  - Yuan Zuan (源纂), courtesy name Lingxiu (灵秀)
- Yuan Huan (源奂), courtesy name Sizhou (思周), sonless, so his nephew Yuan Xuanliang was made his heir

== Notes and references ==
Notes

Sources

- Book of Wei, vols. 41, 99.
- Zizhi Tongjian, vols. 116, 123, 126, 128, 131, 132, 133, 135.
