= Yuan Ye (emperor) =

Yuan Ye 元曄

Emperor of Northern Wei
- Reign: December 5, 530 – April 1, 531
- Predecessor: Emperor Xiaozhuang
- Successor: Emperor Jiemin
- Died: 26 December 532
Names
- Family name: Yuán (元); Given name: Yè (曄)
Era name and dates
- Jiàn míng (建明): 530-531
- House: Yuan
- Dynasty: Northern Wei

Yuan Ye (Chinese: 元曄) (509? – 26 December 532), courtesy name Huaxing (華興), nickname Penzi (盆子), often known by his pre-imperial title Prince of Changguang (長廣王), was briefly an emperor of the Xianbei-led Northern Wei dynasty of China. He was declared emperor by members of the paramount general Erzhu Rong's clan in 530 after Emperor Xiaozhuang had killed Erzhu Rong, and he carried the imperial title for several months. However, as a member of the imperial clan who was distant from the lineage of recent emperors, (Note: as a descendant of Emperor Wencheng's brother Yuan Zhen (元楨) the Prince of Nan'an) he was not a credible emperor. In 531, after the Erzhus had prevailed over Emperor Xiaozhuang and put him to death, they forced Yuan Ye to yield the throne to Emperor Xiaozhuang's cousin Yuan Gong the Prince of Guangling, who took the throne as Emperor Jiemin. Emperor Jiemin treated Yuan Ye with respect and created him the Prince of Donghai, a higher title than his prior title of Prince of Changguang, but after Emperor Jiemin and the Erzhus were in turn overthrown by a coalition led by the general Gao Huan and replaced with Emperor Xiaowu, Emperor Xiaowu forced Yuan Ye to commit suicide.

== Background ==
Relatively not much is known about Yuan Ye's early life. His father Yuan Yi (元怡) was a son of Tuoba Zhen (拓跋楨) the Prince of Nan'an, a brother of Emperor Wencheng and son of Tuoba Huang, Emperor Taiwu's crown prince. Tuoba Zhen's line was dishonored after Tuoba Zhen participated in a plot against Emperor Xiaowen's sinicization regime, but Yuan Yi's older brother Yuan Ying (元英) was eventually created the Prince of Zhongshan after he achieved much in the battlefield. Yuan Yi himself was said to be corrupt and violent when serving as the commanding general of the garrison at remote Shanshan (鄯善, in modern Turpan, Xinjiang), and who fled and hid after accusations of such corruption was made against him, dying while in flight sometime between 512 and 515. One of Yuan Yi's sisters married the general Erzhu Rong, and after Erzhu became the paramount general of the empire during the reign of Emperor Xiaozhuang, Yuan Yi was posthumously honored as the Prince of Fufeng.

Yuan Ye himself was not Yuan Yi's oldest son, as he had at least one older brother, Yuan Su (元肅). His mother was Lady Wei, and it is unclear whether she was Yuan Yi's wife or not. Early in Emperor Xiaozhuang's reign, probably on account of his aunt, Yuan Ye was created the Prince of Changguang on 21 May 528 and made the acting governor of Bing Province (并州, modern central Shanxi), deep in Erzhu Rong's power base. According to the Book of Wei (Note: The author, Wei Shou, might have had an incentive to defame him.), he was frivolous and impatient, but physically strong, in his youth.

== Becoming emperor ==
In fall 530, Emperor Xiaozhuang, fearful that Erzhu Rong would eventually seize the throne, ambushed him inside the palace in the capital Luoyang and killed him. Erzhu Rong's wife (Yuan Ye's aunt), along with Erzhu Rong's cousin Erzhu Shilong, fought their way out of Luoyang and headed back north, meeting up with Erzhu Rong's nephew Erzhu Zhao at Zhangzi (長子, in modern Changzhi, Shanxi). They decided to make Yuan Ye emperor, as a competing candidate for the throne against Emperor Xiaozhuang. Yuan Ye created a daughter of Erzhu Zhao empress. (Note: It is not clear whether he had already married her previously, or only married her at that point.)

Less than two months later, the Erzhu forces captured Luoyang and arrested Emperor Xiaozhuang. Emperor Xiaozhuang was subsequently delivered to Jinyang (晉陽, in modern Taiyuan, Shanxi) and killed. Meanwhile, Erzhu Shilong, believing that Yuan Ye's mother Lady Wei would exert political influence, had her assassinated, but staged the assassination to appear as a robbery. Meanwhile, Yuan Ye himself was escorted south toward Luoyang, apparently to take over the throne formally.

However, Erzhu Shilong and his brothers secretly believed that Yuan Ye was too distant in lineage from the recent emperors and lacked sufficient good reputation to be emperor. They made overtures to Yuan Gong the Prince of Guangling, a son of Emperor Xiaowen's brother Yuan Yu (元羽), forcing Yuan Gong to cooperate. When Yuan Ye arrived in Luoyang's vicinity, Erzhu Shilong forced him to yield the throne to Yuan Gong, who took the throne as Emperor Jiemin. (Note: Erzhu Zhao, who was not involved in Erzhu Shilong's plot to replace Yuan Ye with Emperor Jiemin, was initially angered and considered attacking Erzhu Shilong, but calmed down after Erzhu Shilong sent his brother Erzhu Yanbo (爾朱彥伯) to explain the reasoning, and Erzhu Zhao did not carry out any further actions to try to restore Yuan Ye as emperor.)

== After removal ==
Emperor Jiemin created Yuan Ye the Prince of Donghai, a greater title than his original title of Prince of Changguang, and generally treated him with respect. However, Emperor Jiemin lacked much actual power, and the Erzhus remained in control of most of governmental and military affairs, drawing ire from the people for their corruption. The general Gao Huan declared a rebellion against the Erzhus in 531 and declared another member of the imperial clan, Yuan Lang, emperor. By 532, Gao had defeated the Erzhus and imprisoned Emperor Jiemin. Because Yuan Lang was also distant from the lineage of recent emperors, Gao then removed him and replaced him with Yuan Xiu the Prince of Pingyang, a son of Yuan Huai (元懷), a son of Emperor Xiaowen, and Yuan Xiu took the throne as Emperor Xiaowu. In summer 532, Emperor Xiaowu first put Emperor Jiemin to death by poisoning. In winter 532, he similarly put Yuan Ye and Yuan Lang to death, probably by forcing them to commit suicide by poison. Yuan Ye died and his title of Prince of Donghai was not inherited by anyone.

== Family ==
=== Consorts and issue ===
- Princess consort, of the Erzhu clan (王妃 爾朱氏)
- Unknown
  - Yuan Liang, Marquis Jinyang (晉陽侯 元良)

== Notes ==
Regnal titles
Preceded by Emperor Xiaozhuang of Northern Wei	Emperor of Northern Wei; 530–531	Succeeded by Emperor Jiemin of Northern Wei
