= Consort Feng =

Consort Feng may refer to:

- Feng Yuan (died 6 BC), concubine of Emperor Yuan of Han
- Empress Dowager Feng (442–490), wife of Emperor Wencheng of Northern Wei
- Feng Qing (fl. 5th century), first wife of Emperor Xiaowen of Northern Wei
- Feng Run (died 499), second wife of Emperor Xiaowen of Northern Wei
- Feng Xiaolian (died 581?), concubine of Gao Wei (penultimate emperor of Northern Qi)
- Empress Feng (Later Jin) (fl. 10th century), wife of Shi Chonggui (last emperor of Later Jin)
