= Lu Zuo Zhaoyi =

Rouran consort

Lü Zhaoyi 闾昭仪
- Born: Early 5th century
- Died: after 430
- Spouse: Emperor Taiwu
- Issue: Tuoba Yu, Prince Yin of Nan'an
- House: Rouran
- Father: Khan Datan

Zuo Zhaoyi, of the Lü clan (闾左昭仪; lit. 'Left Lady Lü of Bright Deportment') was the consort of Emperor Taiwu of Northern Wei. She was the descendant of Rouran and was born into the ruling Rouran clan. She was the mother of Tuoba Yu, who was briefly Emperor of Northern Wei.

== Biography ==
In 434 Emperor Taiwu gave Princess Xihai in marriage to Wuti Khan, and took in turn Wuti's sister Lu Zuo Zhaoyi as his wife.

Lu Zuo Zhaoyi bore the emperor Tuoba Yu, Prince Yin of Nan'an and briefly Emperor of Northern Wei. She was born into the Rouran royal family, the daughter of Khan Datan, and the sister of Wuti. In 452, the eunuch Zong Ai killed Emperor Taiwu and put Taiwu's son Tuoba Yu on the throne; he then killed Tuoba Yu as well. The other officials overthrew Zong and put Emperor Taiwu's grandson Tuoba Jun (son of Tuoba Huang the Crown Prince, who predeceased him) on the throne as Emperor Wencheng. Wencheng was the son of Empress Gong, or Consort Yujiulü (郁久閭椒房), also from the Yujiulü clan.

== In popular culture ==
- Portrayed by Ding Ziling in the 2016 TV series The Princess Weiyoung.

== Sources ==
- "Biography No. 91". Book of Wei. 554.
- Book of Wei, Biographies of the sixth Taiwu and the fifth king of Nan'an.
