= Yonggu Mausoleum =

North Wei dynasty burial site in Shanxi Province, China

The Yonggu Mausoleum (Chinese: 永固陵) is the mausoleum of Empress Feng (442–490), formally Empress Wenming and the wife of Emperor Wencheng of the Northern Wei dynasty of Chinese history. The tomb is located on a mountain about 25 kilometers from the city of Datong, in Shanxi Province. When her husband died in 465, Empress Dowager Wenming became regent until her stepson, Emperor Xiaowen, attained his adulthood. While Emperor Xiaowen assumed the imperial powers upon adulthood, she remained highly influential until her death in 490. Around this time, Buddhism became a state religion and Empress Dowager Wenming was responsible for the imperial shrines at Yungang Grottoes. There is evidence that Empress Dowager Wenming masterminded the transformation of the government and the sinification movement.

When the Empress died, she was buried with extraordinary honors. Emperor Xiaowen was distraught and could not eat or drink for five days.

== The tomb ==
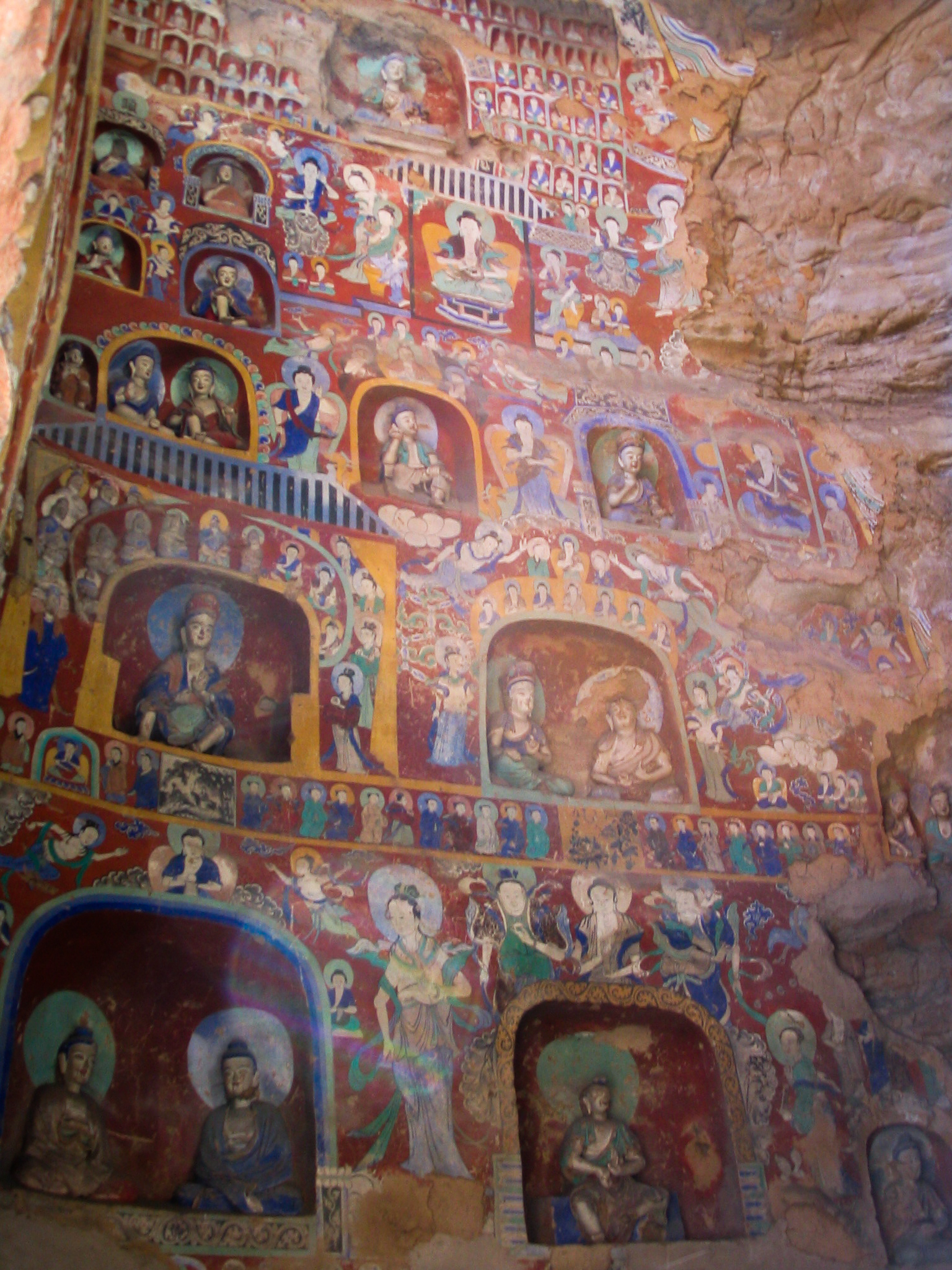
Northern Wei shrine painting, Yungang Grottoes, 460–525 AD

Northern Wei tombs and shrines were of considerable architectural importance and the Empress's tomb was built during a period of striking tomb and shrine building. The construction of her tomb had begun in 484 on Mount Fang (Fangshan (方山), the modern name is Erliangshan (兒涼山)). It sits on hilly ground along with other royal tombs. It was excavated in 1976 and has since been the subject of scholarly research.

The double-chambered royal tomb, with its distinctive architecture, is dug into the side of a hill. It was created in the period before the capital of the Northern Wei moved to Luoyang. Over her bricked tomb was built a huge mound almost 33 metres high with a square base. Leading down from the mound was a diagonal ramp leading into an antechamber, then through a connective passageway to a large burial chamber. The total length of the interior was almost 18 metres, larger than any tomb in the area and one of the largest Northern Wei tombs excavated thus far. The walls were covered with relief sculptures. As mentioned, this royal tomb has two chambers, the first being an anteroom to which the bricked pathway led. Single chamber tombs were more common for nonroyal burials.

The anteroom had a simple barrel vault roof. However, the roof of the burial chamber in the back had a coffer ceiling that, although vaulted, had a flat wooden beamed top. A stone Hall of Eternal Resoluteness was built 600 metres to the south of the tomb with a walkway lined with stelae with inscriptions of funerary text and lined with sculptures of animals. A wall enclosed the whole funerary area with the entrance marked by free standing gate towers (que). The tomb is oriented on a north-south axis with the tomb's entrance on the south.
