= Prince of Pingyuan =

Prince of Pingyuan may refer to:

- Rulers of Pingyuan Commandery during the Han period
- Cao Rui (died 239), emperor of Cao Wei, known as Prince of Pingyuan before his coronation
- Helian Ding (died 432), emperor of Xia, known as Prince of Pingyuan before his coronation
- Buliugu Li (died 465), official of Northern Wei
- Li Ning (Tang dynasty) (793–812), prince of the Tang dynasty
- Han Tuozhou (1152–1207), official of the Song dynasty

== See also ==
- Lord of Pingyuan (c. 308–251 BC)
