= Gao Yun =

Gao Yun may refer to:

- Gao Yun (emperor), first emperor of Northern Yan state.
- Gao Yun (duke), official of Northern Wei dynasty.
