= Feng Fei =

Feng Fei may refer to:

- Feng Fei (politician) (born 1962), Chinese politician
- Feng Fei (baseball) (born 1983), Chinese baseball player

== See also ==
- Consort Feng (disambiguation)
