= Consort Yujiulü =

Consort Yujiulü may refer to:

- Consort Yujiulü (Northern Yan) (fl. 414), concubine of Feng Ba
- Lu Zuo Zhaoyi (died after 430), concubine of Emperor Taiwu of Northern Wei
- Empress Gong (died 452), Tuoba Huang's wife and Emperor Wencheng of Northern Wei's mother
- Empress Yujiulü (525–540), wife of Emperor Wen of Western Wei
- Princess Linhe (537–550), wife of Emperor Wucheng of Northern Qi before he became an emperor
