= Consort Lu =

Consort Lu may refer to:

== Consorts with the surname Lu ==
- Lu Huinan (412–466), concubine of Emperor Wen of Liu Song
- Empress Lu (Liu Song dynasty) (fl. 465), wife of Emperor Qianfei of Liu Song
- Empress Lu (Tang dynasty) (fl. 710), wife of Emperor Shang of Tang
- Imperial Noble Consort Qinggong (1724–1774), concubine of the Qianlong Emperor

== Consorts with the surname Lü ==
- Lü Zhi (241–180 BC), wife of Emperor Gaozu of Han
- Empress Lü (Houshao) (died 180 BC), wife of Emperor Houshao of Han

== Consorts with the title Consort Lu ==
- Consort Lu (Xianfeng) (1841–1895), concubine of the Xianfeng Emperor

== See also ==
- Lu Lingxuan (died 577), powerful lady-in-waiting in the palace of Northern Qi
- Consort Yujiulü (disambiguation), Yujiulü's sinicized name being Lü
