= Deposed Empress Feng =

Empress Feng (Note: The name "Feng Qing" (馮清) is not recorded in history.) (fl.490s), also known as Empress Xiaowenfei (孝文废皇后, literally "(Emperor) Xiaowen's Deposed Empress"), was an empress of the Xianbei-led Chinese Northern Wei dynasty. She was Emperor Xiaowen's first empress.

Lady Feng was a daughter of Feng Xi (馮熙) the Prince of Changli, who was a brother of the powerful Grand Empress Dowager Feng, the wife of Emperor Wencheng and regent over his son Emperor Xianwen and grandson Emperor Xiaowen. (Note: Through her father, she was therefore also a great-granddaughter of the last Northern Yan emperor Feng Hong.) Her mother was probably Feng Xi's wife Princess Boling. She had two older half-sisters (by Feng Xi's concubine Lady Chang) who were concubines of Emperor Xiaowen — Feng Zhaoyi and an unnamed sister, but the unnamed sister died early, and after Feng Zhaoyi had a major illness, she left the palace and became a Buddhist nun.

On 19 May 493, Emperor Xiaowen took Empress Xiaowenfei as his empress. She initially was much favored. However, after Emperor Xiaowen found out that Feng Zhaoyi had recovered, he took her back as a concubine. (Note: There is some evidence, but not conclusive, that Empress Xiaowenfei might have been involved in her sister's being returned to the palace.) Feng Zhaoyi, because she was Emperor Xiaowen's concubine earlier and an older sister, refused to submit to Empress Xiaowenfei, and tried to undermine Empress Xiaowenfei's position as an empress, including accusing her of being against Emperor Xiaowen's Sinicization program. On Empress Xiaowenfei's part, although she was not prone to jealousy, she often expressed shame and hatred at her elder half-sister's insolence. In c.August 496, Emperor Xiaowen deposed Empress Xiaowenfei.

Because Empress Xiaowenfei was virtuous and much interested in Buddhism, she became a Buddhist nun and remained one for the rest of her life. She died at Yaoguang Temple at an unknown date. It is likely, but not conclusive, that she outlived her older half-sister (known posthumously as Empress You), who was killed after Emperor Xiaowen's death in April 499.

== Notes ==
Chinese royalty
Preceded by Empress Feng (Wencheng)	Empress of Northern Wei; 493–496	Succeeded by Empress Feng Run
Preceded by Empress Feng (Wencheng)	Empress of China (Northern); 493–496	Succeeded by Empress Feng Run
Preceded by Empress Wang Zhenfeng of Liu Song	Empress of China (Shandong/Northern Jiangsu); 493–496	Succeeded by Empress Feng Run
