= Buliugu Li =

- Native name: 步六孤麗
- Died: 465
- Spouses: Lady Du; Lady Zhang
- Issue: Buliugu Dingguo; Buliugu Rui

Buliugu Li (Chinese: 步六孤麗) (died 25 June 465), more commonly known in historical accounts as Lu Li (陸麗) (after the change of Xianbei names to Han names in 496, Xianbei surname "Buliugu" was changed to "Lu"), Xianbei nickname Yili (伊利), formally Prince Jian of Pingyuan (平原簡王), was a high-level ethnic Xianbei official of the Northern Wei dynasty of China who served mostly during the reign of Emperor Wencheng.

Buliugu Li's father Buliugu Qi (步六孤俟) was a general under Emperor Taiwu, whose accomplishments included inducing the uncles of the Lushuihu rebel Gai Wu (蓋吳) to assassinate him and surrender in 446. Buliugu Li himself served in the imperial guard corps, and because Emperor Taiwu believed him to be faithful and careful, Emperor Taiwu created him the Viscount of Zhang'an, and later made him a minister in the southern regional administration of the imperial government.

In 452, Emperor Taiwu was assassinated by the eunuch Zong Ai, who made Emperor Taiwu's son Tuoba Yu the Prince of Nan'an emperor, but assassinated him later that year as well. Buliugu Li, along with Dugu Ni (獨孤尼), Yuan He, and Baba Kehou (拔拔渴侯), rose in a coup d'etat and overthrew Zong, making Tuoba Jun, the son of Emperor Taiwu's crown prince Tuoba Huang, emperor (as Emperor Wencheng). Because of this accomplishment, Emperor Wencheng trusted him greatly and created him the Prince of Pingyuan. He initially declined, stating that his father had accomplished much during Emperor Taiwu's reign and yet was not a prince, and he did not dare to take a title greater than his father's -- to which Emperor Wencheng reacted by creating his father a prince as well. He declined again, but Emperor Wencheng did not accept his refusal. Buliugu Li went unscathed during the internecine struggles between the high-level officials early in Emperor Wencheng's reign, and appeared to have been one of the victors in the struggles.

Buliugu Li was said to favor literary studies, and he often taught students on the subject as well. He was also praised for his filial piety toward his father, and when Buliugu Qi died in 458, Buliugu Li mourned so greatly that he became ill.

In 465, Emperor Wencheng died and was succeeded by his young son Emperor Xianwen, and the power soon fell into the hands of the official Yifu Hun, who soon killed a number of high-level officials, including Yang Baoping (楊保平), Jia Airen (賈愛仁) the Duke of Pingyang, and Zhang Tiandu (張天度) the Duke of Nanyang. At this time, because illness, Buliugu Li, who then carried the title of prime minister, was spending time at the springs in Dai Commandery (代, roughly modern Zhangjiakou, Hebei). Yifu sent the official Qiumuling Duohou (丘穆陵多侯) to summon Buliugu back to the capital Pingcheng (平城, in modern Datong, Shanxi) in the name of the emperor. Instead, Qiumuling warned Buliugu that Yifu was violent and had no good intentions, and suggested that Buliugu should wait before returning to Pingcheng. Buliugu declined, stating that when one heard that the emperor had died, one must immediately attend to the funeral matters without fearing disaster, and therefore rushed back to Pingcheng. He immediately got into arguments with Yifu over Yifu's unlawful actions, and Yifu executed both him and Qiumuling. After Emperor Wencheng's wife Empress Dowager Feng in turn overthrew Yifu in 466, she buried Buliugu with honors near the imperial tombs.

Buliugu Li had two wives, probably in succession rather than at the same time. The first wife was Lady Du or Duguhun, who bore him a son named Buliugu Dingguo (步六孤定國, later Lu Dingguo (陸定國)), and the second was Lady Zhang, who bore him a son named Buliugu Rui (步六孤叡, later Lu Rui (陸叡)). Both Buliugu Dingguo and Buliugu Rui later served in the imperial government.

== Notes and references ==
- Book of Wei, vol. 40.
- History of Northern Dynasties, vol. 16.
- Zizhi Tongjian, vols. 126, 128, 130.
