= Yuan Xun =

Yuan Xun (元恂) (27 May 483–497), né Tuoba Xun (拓跋恂, changed 496), courtesy name originally Yuandao (元道), then Xuandao (宣道, changed 496), was a crown prince of the Xianbei-led Northern Wei dynasty of China.

Tuoba Xun was born in May 483, as Emperor Xiaowen's oldest son. His mother was Consort Lin. At the time he was born, Emperor Xiaowen's step-grandmother Grand Empress Dowager Feng was the regent, and she opined that, pursuant to Northern Wei's tradition that a crown prince's mother should be forced to commit suicide, Consort Lin, because Tuoba Xun would presumably eventually become crown prince, should be forced to commit suicide. Even though Emperor Xiaowen did not want to follow that tradition, he did not want to disobey Grand Empress Dowager Feng, and Consort Lin was forced to commit suicide. He did, however, posthumously honor her as Empress Zhen, and buried her at the ancestral tomb of the emperors.

Grand Empress Dowager Feng raised Tuoba Xun herself. In 486, when he was three (four by East Asian reckoning), she formally named him "Xun", and also gave him the courtesy name "Yuandao". She died in 490, and it is not clear who raised him after that point. In 493, Emperor Xiaowen created him crown prince. In 494, when Emperor Xiaowen moved the capital from Pingcheng (平城, in modern Datong, Shanxi) to Luoyang as a major part of sinicization campaign, Tuoba Xun accompanied his father south. In 496, when Emperor Xiaowen changed the imperial clan's family name from Tuoba to Yuan, the crown prince's courtesy name was changed from Yuandao to Xuandao.

Yuan Xun was described as obese and uninterested in studies, but liked horseriding. Because he could not endure Luoyang's much warmer weather, he often wanted to return to Pingcheng, but did not get a chance to do so until 495, when Emperor Xiaowen sent him to Pingcheng to mourn Grand Empress Dowager Feng's brother Feng Xi (馮熙), who was in charge of the old capital. From this point on, whenever Emperor Xiaowen conducted campaigns against rival Southern Qi, Yuan Xun would often be formally in charge of the capital, although high-level officials were actually responsible for important matters. It was also around this time that Emperor Xiaowen considered having him marry Feng Xi's granddaughter as his wife, but because she was young, Emperor Xiaowen took for Yuan Xun two concubines first—Consorts Liu and Zheng, both daughters of his officials. However, on advice of Yuan Xun's teachers, who believed that overly engaging in sexual relations would stunt the crown prince's growth and interfere with his studies, Emperor Xiaowen did not permit him to have sexual intercourse with them during the day. (The implication of the passage in question from the Book of Wei appears to suggest that he did not have sexual relations with them at all, but it is not clear; in any case, neither had children.)

In fall 496, while Emperor Xiaowen was away from the capital, Yuan Xun, unable to endure the heat in Luoyang, made an impulsive decision to seize horses and flee with his attendants to Pingcheng. His assistant Gao Daoyue (高道悅) tried to persuade him not to carry out this action, and Yuan Xun killed him. However, the news leaked, and the general Yuan Yan (元儼) closed the city gates and prevented the crown prince from leaving. Once Emperor Xiaowen returned to the capital, he, along with his brother Yuan Xi (元禧) the Prince of Xianyang, caned Yuan Xun more than 100 times, and then imprisoned him. About one and a half months later, Emperor Xiaowen deposed Yuan Xun and demoted him to commoner rank, changed his courtesy name to Xuandao and put him under house arrest with minimal supplies. On 23 February 497, Emperor Xiaowen created Yuan Xun's oldest younger brother Yuan Ke as crown prince, to replace him.

Once deposed, Yuan Xun much regretted his actions. However, the official Li Biao (李彪), in charge of guarding him, then made a false report to Emperor Xiaowen that Yuan Xun was still plotting with his attendants. In summer 497, Emperor Xiaowen sent Yuan Xi and the official Xing Luan (邢巒) to give Yuan Xun poison and order him to take it. He was given a commoner's burial near his place of house arrest. His mother Consort Lin was posthumously demoted from empress to commoner status as well.
