= Lü Pi =

Chinese general (?–461)

Lü Pi Duke of Hedong
- 闾毗
- Born: Mongolian Plateau
- Died: 461 CE
- Military career
- Rank: General of Pingbei; Grand Commandant (posthumous)

Lü Pi (Chinese: 閭毗), also Yujiulü Pi (Chinese: 郁久閭毗), the Duke of Hedong (河東王) (died 461), was a Northern Wei general of Rouran descent.

He was a member of the Rouran's royal house, who surrendered to the Northern Wei. Pi was the brother of Empress Gong, the consort of Emperor Wencheng of Northern Wei and the mother of Emperor Wencheng.

In the second year of the Tai'an era (456), Emperor Wencheng begged him to become General of Pingbei, and he was appointed such the same year. He was also created Duke of Hedong. He then rose to the position of Grand chancellor (侍中, shizhong). He died in the second Year of Peace (461), and was posthumously honored with the title of Grand Commandant.

== Sources ==
- The Book of Wei, Volume 83 Part 71.
- History of the Northern Dynasties, Volume 80 Biography No. 68.
