= The Princess Weiyoung =

2016 Chinese historical series

- Promotional poster
- Traditional Chinese: 錦繡未央
- Simplified Chinese: 锦绣未央
- Hanyu Pinyin: Jǐnxiù Wèiyāng
- Genre: Historical fiction; Romance
- Based on: The Concubine's Daughter is Poisonous (庶女有毒) by Qin Jian (秦简)
- Written by: Cheng Tingyu
- Directed by: Li Huizhu
- Starring: Tiffany Tang; Luo Jin; Vanness Wu; Mao Xiaotong; Li Xin'ai
- Opening theme: If Heaven Has Compassion by A-Lin
- Ending theme: Heavenly Gift by Tiffany Tang and Luo Jin
- Country of origin: China
- Original language: Mandarin
- No. of seasons: 1
- No. of episodes: 54

Production
- Production location: Hengdian World Studios
- Running time: 45 minutes
- Production companies: Croton Media; Yuehua Entertainment; Feng Jing Media

Original release
- Network: Dragon TV; Beijing TV
- Release: November 11 – December 9, 2016

Related
- The Song of Glory

The Princess Weiyoung (Chinese: 锦绣未央; pinyin: Jǐnxiù Wèiyāng) is a 2016 Chinese television series starring Tiffany Tang in the title role, alongside Luo Jin, Vanness Wu, Mao Xiaotong and Li Xin'ai. Adapted from the novel The Concubine's Daughter is Poisonous by Qin Jian, it's a fictionalized account of Emperor Wencheng of Northern Wei's reign and Empress Dowager Feng's regency. The series aired on Dragon TV and Beijing TV from November 11 to December 9, 2016.

The series received mixed reviews. It was praised for its fast storyline that showcased the growth of a strong and independent female lead, as well as for fleshing out the background stories of various supporting characters. Viewership ratings reached as high as 2%, making it one of the highest rated drama of 2016. However, it was criticized for its cliché plot devices, illogical plot details, use of excessive and inappropriate makeup, and dubbing of actors' voices. Investigations and a lawsuit showed that the original novel was heavily plagiarized from other similar stories. Nevertheless, the series was nominated for several awards, winning actor and actress awards for both Luo Jin and Tiffany Tang, and the Best Chinese Language Drama award at the 5th Annual DramaFever Awards.

Its spin-off sequel, The Song of Glory, aired in July 2020.

== Synopsis ==
During the chaotic Northern and Southern dynasties, the Northern Liang's royal family has a princess named Feng Xin'er (Tiffany Tang) who was kind, carefree and loved by all. Chiyun Nan, a marshal from the Chiyun clan of Northern Wei, is driven by greed to overrun Northern Liang and turns it into a bloodbath, massacring the royal family and forcing the Princess to survive on her own.

Li Weiyoung, the daughter of the Prime Minister of Northern Wei by his seventh concubine, shields the Princess from harm. However, Li Weiyoung is killed by the Chiyun family, of which the Prime Minister's wife Chiyun Rou is a member, as they are not pleased when she is recalled to the Prime Minister's Mansion.

Feng Xin'er assumes Li Weiyoung's identity and resides in the mansion, where she is disliked and shunned by her elder half-sister Li Changle and her stepmother Chiyun Rou. She thus takes it upon herself to fight against the Chiyun clan and becomes entangled with Northern Wei's prince, Tuoba Jun (Luo Jin). She also attracts the eye of Tuoba Yu (Vanness Wu) who sees her as a chess piece to be used toward his ultimate goal of becoming emperor. Through her struggles, she gains wisdom and is finally able to find peace for her family while living true to her heart.

== Cast ==
=== Main ===
- Tiffany Tang as Li Weiyoung / Feng Xin'er
  - Kind, bright and intelligent, she is a princess of Northern Liang who assumes the identity of Li Weiyoung, the concubine-born daughter of Northern Wei's Prime Minister Li, in order to avenge her own family as well as Li Weiyoung.
- Luo Jin as Tuoba Jun, Prince of Gaoyang
  - Sunny and compassionate, he is the Emperor's favorite grandson as well as the deceased Crown Prince's son. As a result, he is targeted by the Emperor's other sons, Tuoba Han and Tuoba Yu, but he doesn't wish to be involved in politics.
- Vanness Wu as Tuoba Yu, Prince of Nan'an
  - Cunning, ruthless and cold-blooded, he is the Emperor's son whose greatest ambition is to become the emperor.
- Mao Xiaotong as Li Changru
  - Daughter of the second branch of the Li family and Li Weiyoung's younger cousin. Having been oppressed and overshadowed by Li Changle from a young age, she has grown up to be ruthless and hides her hypocritical and scheming nature behind a weak and delicate appearance.
- Li Xin'ai as Li Changle
  - Prime Minister Li's legitimate daughter by Chiyun Rou and Li Weiyoung's elder half-sister. Known as the first beauty of the capital, she is arrogant and selfish, and Li Weiyoung's appearance makes her insecure and jealous.

=== Supporting ===
==== Northern Wei ====
Imperial palace

- Canti Lau as Tuoba Tao, Emperor Taiwu of Northern Wei
- Wan Meixi as Empress Helian
- Ding Ziling as Lu Zhaoyi
  - Tuoba Yu's mother.
- Wang Yujing as Tuoba Huang, Crown Prince Jingmu
  - Tuoba Jun's deceased father.
- Xu Rongzhen as Crown Princess Yujiulü
  - Tuoba Jun's mother.
- Zhang Tianyang as Tuoba Han, Prince of Dongping
- Chen Yuqi as Tuoba Di, Princess Shanggu
- Hou Ruixiang as Zong Ai
  - The Emperor's personal eunuch.
- Meng Fei as Gao Yun
- Rui Weihang as Cheng De
  - Tuoba Jun's subordinate.
- Wu Hong as Cheng An
  - Tuoba Yu's subordinate.
- Zhang Yuechi as Jiang Zuo
  - Tuoba Han's subordinate.
- Guan Shan as Qiu Yi
  - Personal servant of Crown Princess Yujiulü.
- Jiang Zhen as Xiao Linzi
- Liu Fenggang as Physician Liu
- Han Yan as Head Attendant Liang
- Li Jiaxi as Cai Ping

Li Mansion

- Wang Liyuan as Old Madame Li
  - Li Weiyoung's grandmother.
- Bai Fan as Li Xiaoran
  - Prime Minister of Northern Wei. Li Weiyoung's father.
- Lily Tien as Chiyun Rou
  - First Madame of the Li family. Li Xiaoran's wife, and Li Minfeng and Li Changle's birth mother.
- Hu Caihong as Wen Weiyi
  - Second Madame of the Li Family. Li Changru and Li Changxi's birth mother.
- Wang Wanjuan as Zhou Xuemei
  - Third Madame of the Li Family. Li Minde's adoptive mother.
- Liu Jie as Seventh Concubine
  - Li Weiyoung's birth mother.
- Nan Fulong as Li Minfeng
  - Eldest Young Master of the Li family. He is power-hungry, lustful, and manipulative.
- Li Yixiao as Li Weiyoung
  - Second Miss of the Li family. She was thrown out of the mansion after being born on an inauspicious date. After her death, Feng Xin'er assumes her identity to avenge both the murder of her own family members, and also that of Li Weiyoung herself.
- Peng Doudou as Li Changxi
  - Fourth Miss of the Li family. She likes to eat, and often sucks up to Li Changle.
- Zhou Meiyi as Chun Ming
  - Chiyun Rou's accomplice and personal servant.
- Mu Le'en as Bai Zhi
  - Li Weiyoung's loyal servant.
- Tian Yixi as Zi Yan
  - Li Weiyoung's personal servant.
- Peng Yingying as Cui'er
  - Seventh Concubine's personal servant.
- Jin Pohan as Rong'er
  - Li Changru's loyal servant.
- Chang Shixin as Tan Xiang
  - Li Changle's personal servant.
- Wang Tianhong as Liu Hong
  - Li Changxi's personal servant.
- Dai Chunrong as Nurse Liu
  - Li Weiyoung's caretaker during her years outside the mansion.
- Zhu Xingyu as Ping An
  - Li Minde's subordinate.
- Tan Songmei as Nanny Luo
  - Old Madame Li's personal servant.

Chiyun Mansion

- Tang Jiayang as Old Madame Chiyun
- Jin Han as Chiyun Nan
  - Marshal of Northern Wei and Chiyun Rou's nephew who frames King Hexi of Northern Liang of rebellion.
- Ji Xiaobing as Chiyun Si
- Zhang Shenghao as Chiyun Wei
- Yang Zuqing as Hong Luo
  - Chiyun Nan's faithful follower.

==== Northern Liang ====
- Leanne Liu as Queen Dowager
  - Feng Xin'er's loving grandmother.
- Tan Kai as King Hexi of Northern Liang
  - Feng Xin'er's father.
- Sun Wei as Uncle Ming
  - Head of the royal guards and Jun Tao's father.
- Wang Yanzhi as Jun Tao
  - Feng Xin'er's bodyguard and confidante.
- Zhang Hengping as fortune-telling monk

==== Rouran ====
- Liang Zhenlun as Li Minde / Yujiulü Yuanlie
  - Crown Prince of the Rouran under Yujiulü Tuhezhen. He was adopted as the Second Young Master of the Li family by Zhou Xuemei.
- Wang Wei as Princess Anle
  - Li Minde's younger sister.
- Li Ang as General Jiao
  - Minister of the Rouran. He secretly trails and protects Li Minde.

== Original soundtrack ==
=== Mainland China ===
No.	Title	Lyrics	Singer	Length
1.	"If Heaven Has Compassion (天若有情)" (Opening theme)	Zoe Ki	A-Lin
2.	"Heavenly Gift (天赋)" (Ending theme)	Qian Zi	Tiffany Tang; Luo Jin
3.	"Next Life (來生)"	Qian Zi	Li Qi
4.	"Fate Because of Me (緣因我)"	Qian Zi	Jin Han
5.	"Growing Old Interdependently (白首相依)"	Qian Zi	Jin Chi; Sun Bolun
6.	"Illuminating Jade Treasury of Wisdom (玉燭寶典)" (Interlude theme)	Qian Zi	Cui Zige

=== Hong Kong ===
No.	Title	Lyrics	Singer	Length
1.	"A Lifetime of Waiting (一輩子守候)" (Theme song)	Zhang Meixian	Hana Kuk

== Reception ==
=== Ratings ===
- Highest ratings are marked in red, lowest ratings are marked in blue

Date	Episode	Dragon TV			Beijing TV		
Date	Episode	Ratings (%)	Audience share (%)	Rank	Ratings (%)	Audience share (%)	Rank
November 11, 2016	1–2	0.602	1.75	5	0.554	1.61	7
November 12, 2016	3	0.636	1.87	5	0.639	1.88	4
November 13, 2016	4–5	0.79	2.24	3	0.753	2.13	5
November 14, 2016	6–7	0.787	2.29	3	0.683	1.98	6
November 15, 2016	8–9	0.76	2.17	3	0.636	1.81	6
November 16, 2016	10–11	1.007	2.82	3	0.816	2.37	4
November 17, 2016	12–13	1.045	3.03	3	1.004	2.91	4
November 18, 2016	14–15	1.199	3.36	2	1.132	3.16	3
November 19, 2016	16	1.295	3.75	1	1.026	2.95	3
November 20, 2016	17–18	1.2	3.32	3	1.344	3.71	1
November 21, 2016	19–20	1.22	3.46	2	1.208	3.42	3
November 22, 2016	21–22	1.332	3.71	1	1.279	3.56	2
November 23, 2016	23–24	1.341	3.8	1	1.249	3.54	4
November 24, 2016	25–26	1.408	4.02	1	1.279	3.65	2
November 25, 2016	27–28	1.422	3.94	1	1.333	3.7	3
November 26, 2016	29	1.449	4.08	1	1.283	3.62	3
November 27, 2016	30–31	1.497	4.2	1	1.463	4.09	2
November 28, 2016	32–33	1.519	4.39	1	1.374	3.97	3
November 29, 2016	34–35	1.564	4.57	1	1.513	4.41	2
November 30, 2016	36–37	1.717	4.97	1	1.528	4.42	2
December 1, 2016	38–39	1.789	5.21	1	1.578	4.59	2
December 2, 2016	40–41	2.014	5.61	1	1.717	4.78	2
December 3, 2016	42	1.909	5.47	1	1.631	4.68	2
December 4, 2016	43–44	2.142	6.02	1	1.975	5.53	2
December 5, 2016	45–46	2.107	6.12	1	1.847	5.35	2
December 6, 2016	47–48	2.015	5.79	1	1.889	5.42	2
December 7, 2016	49–50	2.126	6.11	1	1.848	5.31	2
December 8, 2016	51–52	2.108	6.1	1	1.893	5.47	2
December 9, 2016	53–54	2.494	7.01	1	2.204	6.18	2
Average ratings		1.483			1.345		

=== Controversy ===
The author of the source novel was involved in a plagiarism case. It was alleged that she used a software to copy hundreds of other works to write her own novel. An alliance formed by 12 writers, including famed wuxia novelist Woon Swee Oan, joined to sue Qin Jian. According to Beijing News, a group of volunteers compared The Concubine's Daughter is Poisonous with more than 200 other novels. They found that out of 294 chapters, only nine chapters were original.

On May 8, 2019, the Chaoyang District People's Court has declared Qin Jian guilty of infringing the works of Shen Wenwen; Qin Jian was fined a total amount of CN¥136,500 ($20,000) for economic loss and intellectual copyright protection to be paid within 10 days of the verdict. Moreover, she must immediately cease sales and distribution of the novel upon the day the sentence was handed down. The scandal was used as an example of popular media plagiarism in a report by CCTV.

=== Awards and nominations ===
Award	Category	Nomination	Result	Ref.
8th China TV Drama Awards	Most Popular Actor	Luo Jin	Won	
8th China TV Drama Awards	Most Popular Actress	Tiffany Tang	Won	
8th China TV Drama Awards	Most Charismatic Actor on the Screen	Vanness Wu	Won	
8th China TV Drama Awards	Most Charismatic Actor on the Screen	Mao Xiaotong	Won	
2nd China Quality Television Drama Ceremony	Audience Favorite TV Series (Dragon TV)		Won	
2nd China Quality Television Drama Ceremony	Most Marketable Actress	Tiffany Tang	Won	
2nd China Quality Television Drama Ceremony	Media's Most Anticipated Actor	Luo Jin	Won	
2nd China Quality Television Drama Ceremony	Media's Most Anticipated Actress	Tiffany Tang	Won	
22nd Huading Awards	Best Actress	Tiffany Tang	Won	
22nd Huading Awards	Best Actor (Ancient)	Luo Jin	Nominated	
5th Annual DramaFever Awards	Best Chinese Language Drama	The Princess Weiyoung	Won	
5th Annual DramaFever Awards	Best Supporting Actress	Mao Xiaotong	Nominated	
5th Annual DramaFever Awards	Best Villain	Vanness Wu	Nominated	
