= Yifu Hun =

Northern Wei king (died 466)

Yifu Hun (Chinese: 乙弗渾) or Yi Hun (乙渾; died 466), Xianbei surname Yifu (乙弗), Xianbei personal name Bu (步), was a high-ranking official of the Xianbei-led Chinese Northern Wei dynasty, who effectively briefly served as the regent for Emperor Xianwen.

Little is known about Yifu Hun's background despite his one-time prominent status, as neither official histories Wei Shu nor Bei Shi contained a biography for him—a fairly unusual fact, as both of those works were generally considered highly comprehensive in including biographies, even for villainous figures. He came to power in 465 after Emperor Wencheng died and was succeeded by his young son Emperor Xianwen. Yifu quickly seized power and killed a number of other officials, including Yang Baoping (楊保平), Jia Airen (賈愛仁) the Duke of Pingyang, and Zhang Tiandu (張天度) the Duke of Nanyang. He then summoned Emperor Wencheng's trusted prime minister Buliugu Li, away from the capital Pingcheng (平城, in modern Datong, Shanxi) back to Pingcheng, and after he got into conflicts with Buliugu, killed Buliugu, as well as Qiumuling Duohou (丘穆陵多侯), who had warned Buliugu not to return to the capital, and Tuoba Yu (拓跋郁) the Duke of Shunyang. He became the commander of the armed forces, and while he was not regent by title, he effectively was regent. He was also created the Prince of Taiyuan.

By 466, Yifu was continuing to carry out a campaign of terror. However, Emperor Wencheng's wife Empress Dowager Feng then staged a coup d'état, probably along with Jia Xiu (賈秀) and Tuoba Pi (拓跋丕), and Yifu was arrested and executed.
