= Empress Gong (Northern Wei) =

Empress consort of Northern Wei

Consort Yujiulü
- Spouse: Tuoba Huang
- Issue: Emperor Wencheng of Northern Wei
Posthumous name
- Empress Gong 恭皇后

Consort Yujiulü (郁久閭椒房, personal name unknown) (died 452), formally Empress Gong (恭皇后, literally "the respectful empress"), was a consort of Tuoba Huang (Crown Prince Jingmu), a crown prince of the Xianbei-led Northern Wei dynasty of China. She was the mother of Emperor Wencheng.

Consort Yujiulü was a sister of Yujiulü Pi (郁久閭毗), who was a member of Rouran's royal house, but who surrendered to Northern Wei and thereafter became a Northern Wei general, during Emperor Taiwu's reign. Consort Yujiulü herself was described as beautiful, and during Emperor Taiwu's reign she was selected to be a consort for his son Tuoba Huang. She was much favored. In 440, the pair had a son, Tuoba Jun. Her husband died in 451, however, after becoming ill over fear of false accusations by the eunuch Zong Ai. Zong subsequently assassinated Emperor Taiwu and Tuoba Huang's younger brother Tuoba Yu (whom he had briefly made emperor) in 452, and then was overthrown by high-ranking officials, who made Tuoba Jun, who was Tuoba Huang's eldest son, emperor (as Emperor Wencheng). Consort Yujiulü died soon thereafter without having been honored as an empress dowager, but later that year, Emperor Wencheng did posthumously honor his parents as emperor and empress, and she became known as Empress Gong.

Scholar Li Ping suggested that Consort Yujiulü died an irregular death, due to the custom that all the mothers of heirs to the Wei throne should be put to death. Indeed, she is said by some scholars to have been killed by the Chang clan in the first year of Xing'an (興安) (452).

== In popular culture ==
- Portrayed by Xu Rongzhen in the 2016 Chinese TV series The Princess Weiyoung.
