= Gao Yun (duke) =

Official and historian in Northern Wei Dynasty China

Gao Yun (Chinese: 高允; 390–487), courtesy name Bogong (伯恭), formally Duke Wen of Xianyang (咸陽文公), was an official and historian during the reigns of five emperors of the Xianbei-led Northern Wei dynasty of China.

== In popular culture ==
- Portrayed by Meng Fei in the 2016 Chinese TV series The Princess Weiyoung.
