= Emperor Xianwen of Northern Wei =

Emperor Xianwen of Northern Wei 北魏獻文帝

Emperor of Northern Wei
- Reign: 21 June 465 – 20 September 471
- Predecessor: Emperor Wencheng
- Successor: Emperor Xiaowen
- Born: 14 August 454
- Died: 20 July 476 (aged 21)
- Burial: Jin Mausoleum of Yunzhong (雲中金陵)
- Consorts: Empress Si
- Issue: Emperor Xiaowen; Yuan Xi; Yuan Gan; Yuan Yu; Yuan Yong; Yuan Xie; Yuan Xiang; Princess Changshan; Princess Lelang; Princess Pengcheng; Princess Le'an; Princess Gaoping
Names
- Family name: Tuòbá (拓跋); Given name: Hóng (弘)
Era dates
- Tiān ān (天安) 466–467; Huáng xīng (皇興) 467–471
Posthumous name
- Emperor Xiànwén (獻文皇帝, lit. "wise and civil")
Temple name
- Xiǎnzǔ (顯祖)
- House: Tuoba
- Dynasty: Northern Wei
- Father: Emperor Wencheng
- Mother: Empress Yuan

Emperor Xianwen of Northern Wei ((北)魏獻文帝) (14 August 454 – 20 July 476), personal name Tuoba Hong, Xianbei name Didouyin (第豆胤), courtesy name Wanmin (萬民), was an emperor of the Xianbei-led Northern Wei dynasty of China. He was the first emperor in Chinese history who, after retiring at age 17 in favor of his 4-year-old son Emperor Xiaowen to become Taishang Huang (retired emperor) in 471, continued to hold on to power until his death in 476—when the official history states vaguely that he may have been killed by his stepmother Empress Dowager Feng.

== Family background ==
Tuoba Hong was born in 454, as Emperor Wencheng's oldest son. His mother was Consort Li, who had previously been captured in war and had become a concubine of Tuoba Ren (拓跋仁) the Prince of Yongchang, a distant relative of Emperor Wencheng, who was executed in 453 after having been accused of crimes. After Tuoba Ren's death, she was seized and taken into the palace, where she became Emperor Wencheng's concubine. In c.March 456, Emperor Wencheng created Tuoba Hong crown prince—and, at the same time, according to Northern Wei customs, ordered Consort Li to commit suicide.

== Reign ==
=== Under Yifu Hun's regency ===
On 20 June 465, Emperor Wencheng died, and the 11-year-old Crown Prince Hong ascended the throne as Emperor Xianwen the next day. Emperor Wencheng's wife Empress Feng was honored as empress dowager, and Emperor Xianwen's deceased mother Consort Li was posthumously honored as Empress Yuan. Power soon fell into the hands of the official Yifu Hun, who assumed dictatorial powers and killed a large number of other officials, including Yang Baoping (楊保平), Jia Airen (賈愛仁) the Duke of Pingyang, and Zhang Tiandu (張天度), Qiumuling Duohou (丘穆陵多侯), Tuoba Yu (拓跋郁) the Duke of Shunyang, and Emperor Wencheng's prime minister Buliugu Li. However, in 466, Empress Dowager Feng staged a coup and had Yifu arrested and executed. She assumed regency herself.

=== Under Empress Dowager Feng's regency ===
Empress Dowager Feng engaged Jia Xiu (賈秀), Gao Yun, and Gao Lü (高閭) as her assistants in the regency. Later, she also incorporated her brother Feng Xi (馮熙) into the decision-making circle.

Empress Dowager Feng was soon presented with a major opportunity to expand Northern Wei territory, as also in 466, rival Liu Song had a major dynastic succession struggle after Liu Ziye was assassinated in 465. Emperor Qianfei's uncle Emperor Ming of Song was declared emperor in the capital Jiankang, while his brother Liu Zixun the Prince of Jin'an was declared emperor in early 466 in Xunyang (尋陽, in modern Jiujiang, Jiangxi). After Emperor Ming's forces defeated Liu Zixun's and captured and executed Liu Zixun in fall 466, the Liu Song general Xue Andu (薛安都), the governor of Xu Province (徐州, modern northern Jiangsu and northern Anhui), who had initially declared for Liu Zixun, was apprehensive that he would be punished by Emperor Ming, and so decided to surrender to Northern Wei, and soon, he was joined by Bi Zhongjing (畢眾敬) the governor of Yan Province (兗州, modern western Shandong) and Chang Zhenqi (常珍奇) the governor of Ru'nan Commandery (汝南, roughly modern Zhumadian, Henan). Empress Dowager Feng sent the general Yuchi Yuan (尉遲元) to accept the surrenders of these Liu Song generals and to secure the region just north of the Huai River, and Yuchi subsequently defeated two attempts by Emperor Ming to recapture those provinces. She also sent the general Murong Baiyao (慕容白曜) to attack and try to capture Liu Song's Qing (青州, modern central and eastern Shandong) and Ji (冀州, modern northwestern Shandong) Provinces, which were cut off from the rest of Liu Song after Xue's defection, and by 469, both provinces fell into Northern Wei hands, and all of the regions north of the Huai River were by now Northern Wei territory.

In 467, Emperor Xianwen's concubine Consort Li—a daughter of his uncle Li Hui (李惠) and therefore his cousin—bore his oldest child Tuoba Hong (different character than his own), and Empress Dowager Feng personally raised the young prince. She soon terminated her regency and returned imperial powers to Emperor Xianwen, who was 13 years old at this point.

=== After assuming imperial authority ===
As emperor, Emperor Xianwen was described as hardworking and appropriate in his awards and punishments—in particular, in promoting honest officials and demoting corrupt ones, and it was said that only starting in his reign were Northern Wei officials praised for being honest. He was also said to be heavily into studies of religions and philosophies, including both Taoism and Buddhism. During his reign as emperor, he abolished 15 non-regular taxes that had earlier been abolished by Emperor Wencheng but soon re-instated, and it was said that after this the people's livelihood gradually improved.

In 469, Emperor Xianwen created Tuoba Hong crown prince. As Tuoba Hong's mother Consort Li died the same year and was described in traditional histories to be missed by all in the palace, she was probably forced to commit suicide pursuant to Northern Wei customs.

In 470, resentful that Murong Baiyao had flattered Yifu Hun while Yifu was in power, Emperor Xianwen, in an act that appeared to be uncharacteristic for his reign, falsely accused Murong Baiyao of treason and put him and his son Murong Ruyi (慕容如意) to death.

Also in 470, an event would damage Emperor Xianwen's relationship with his stepmother Empress Dowager Feng. Empress Dowager Feng had taken the official Li Yi (李奕) as her lover. In 470, the official Li Xin (李訢), who was a close friend of Li Yi's brother Li Fu (李敷), was accused of corruption, and Emperor Xianwen became aware of the accusations even though Li Fu tried to suppress the reports. He had known about his stepmother's relationship with Li Yi and, while he had not taken any actions against it at that point, disapproved of it. He sentenced Li Xin to death, but then informed Li Xin that if he could report on crimes that Li Fu and Li Yi had committed, he would be spared. After initial reluctance, Li Xin did so, and another man named Fan Biao (范標) also did so. Emperor Xianwen then executed Li Fu and Li Yi. Empress Dowager Feng became resentful of Emperor Xianwen after that point.

In 471, because of Emperor Xianwen's philosophical interests, he wanted to leave the throne to spend more time on his studies. He wanted to pass his throne to his uncle Tuoba Zitui (拓跋子推) the Prince of Jingzhao, who was highly praised by all officials. He therefore summoned an imperial council to discuss the matter. The officials largely opposed Emperor Xianwen's proposal, and suggested instead that if Emperor Xianwen wanted to leave the throne, he should pass the throne to Crown Prince Hong. He therefore did so, and the four-year-old crown prince took the throne as Emperor Xiaowen on September 20, 471. Emperor Xianwen himself took the title of Taishang Huangdi (retired emperor) the next day.

== As retired emperor ==
As retired emperor, however, Emperor Xianwen continued to be in control of the Imperial regime, and all important matters were still submitted to him. He spent much time on criminal law matters, and during this time, the criminal cases generally were paid more attention, and while they took longer to process, the results were considered more just.

In 476, legend claims that still resentful of Emperor Xianwen, Empress Dowager Feng killed him. (Most historians, including Sima Guang, believed that she poisoned him, but another version indicated that Empress Dowager Feng readied assassins who, when Emperor Xianwen came to her palace to greet her, seized and smothered him.) However, studies by Zhou Siyuan (周思源) point out that if Feng had killed the monarch, chaos would have ensued, but nothing of the sort happened. Zhou's theory was that after a failed attempt to oust Feng, the Emperor committed suicide. After his death and a smooth transition, Empress Dowager Feng assumed regency over Emperor Xiaowen.

== Family ==
=== Consorts and issue ===
- Empress Si, of the Li clan of Zhongshan (思皇后 中山李氏; d. 469)
  - Yuan Hong, Emperor Xiaowen (孝文皇帝 元宏; 467–499), first son
- Zhaoyi, of the Feng clan (昭儀 封氏)
  - Yuan Xi, Prince Xianyang (咸陽王 元禧; d. 501), second son
- Guiren, of the Han clan (貴人 韓氏)
  - Yuan Gan, Prince Zhaoling (趙靈王 元幹; 469–499), third son
  - Yuan Yong, Prince Gaoyang Wenmu (高陽文穆王 元雍; 470–528), fifth son
- Guiren, of the Pan clan of Changle (貴人 潘氏)
  - Yuan Xie, Emperor Wenmu (文穆皇帝 元勰; 473–508), sixth son
- Jiaofang, of the Meng clan (椒房 孟氏)
  - Yuan Yu, Prince Hui of Guangling (廣陵惠王 元羽; 470–501), fourth son
- Jiaofang, of the Gao clan (椒房 高氏)
  - Yuan Xiang, Prince Ping of Beihai (北海平王 元詳; 476–504), seventh son
- Unknown
  - Princess Changshan (常山公主)
    - Married Lu Xinzhi, Duke Dong (陸昕之; d. 511), and had issue (three daughters)
  - Princess Lelang (樂浪公主)
    - Married Lu Daoyu of Fanyang (范陽 盧道裕; 476–519)
  - Princess Pengcheng (彭城公主), sixth daughter
    - Married Liu Chengxu (劉承緒)
    - Married Wang Su of Langya (琊瑯 王肅; 464–501)
  - Princess Le'an (樂安公主)
    - Married Feng Dan of Changle, Prince Nanping (長樂 馮誕; 467–495), and had issue (two sons)
  - Princess Gaoping (高平公主)
    - Married Gao Zhao of Goguryeo (高句麗 高肇; d. 515)

== In popular culture ==
- Portrayed by Shi Yunpeng in the 2018 Chinese TV series Untouchable Lovers.

Regnal titles
Preceded by Emperor Wencheng of Northern Wei	Emperor of Northern Wei; 465–471	Succeeded by Emperor Xiaowen of Northern Wei
Preceded by Emperor Wencheng of Northern Wei	Emperor of China (Northern); 465–471	Succeeded by Emperor Xiaowen of Northern Wei
Preceded by Emperor Ming of Liu Song	Emperor of China (Northern Jiangsu); 466–471	Succeeded by Emperor Xiaowen of Northern Wei
Preceded by Emperor Ming of Liu Song	Emperor of China (Shandong); 469–471	Succeeded by Emperor Xiaowen of Northern Wei
