= Tuoba Huang =

Crown Prince of Northern Wei
- Reign: 17 February 432 – 29 July 451
- Born: 428
- Died: July 29, 451 (aged 23)
- Spouse: Consort Yujiulü
Posthumous name
- Crown Prince Jingmu 景穆太子; Emperor Jingmu 景穆皇帝
Temple name
- Gongzong 恭宗
- Father: Emperor Taiwu of Northern Wei
- Mother: Empress Jing'ai

Tuoba Huang (拓跋晃) (428 – July 29, 451), Xianbei name Tianzhen (天真), formally Crown Prince Jingmu (景穆太子) (literally "the decisive and solemn crown prince"), later further formally honored as Emperor Jingmu (景穆皇帝) with the temple name Gongzong (恭宗) by his son Emperor Wencheng, was a crown prince of the Xianbei-led Northern Wei dynasty of China. He was the oldest son of Emperor Taiwu, and was created crown prince in 432 at the age of four. As he grew older, Emperor Taiwu transferred more and more authority to him. However, in 451, he incurred the wrath of his father due to false accusations of the eunuch Zong Ai, and many of his associates were put to death. He himself grew ill in fear, and died that year. He is also recorded as one of the youngest fathers in the world, who fathered his son Tuoba Jun at the age of 12.

== Early life ==
Tuoba Huang was born in 428, as Emperor Taiwu's oldest son. His mother's name was rendered as Consort He (賀夫人), but since both the Helan (賀蘭) and Helai (賀賴) clans later changed their names to He (during the reign of Tuoba Huang's great-grandson Emperor Xiaowen), it is unclear whether her name was Helan or Helai. She died the year that she gave birth to him, suggesting that she might have died in childbirth, but there is no conclusive evidence that it happened.

On 17 February 432, Emperor Taiwu created Tuoba Huang crown prince, at the same time that he created one of his consorts, Consort Helian, empress. He became a highly ranked official in his father's administration that same year, although, at age four, the position was likely nominal. In 433, Emperor Taiwu tried to negotiate a marriage between Crown Prince Huang and one of the daughters of Emperor Wen of Liu Song, but Emperor Wen, while not immediately rejecting the proposal, did not agree either.

In 439, when Emperor Taiwu was on a campaign to conquer Northern Liang, he had Crown Prince Huang assume imperial authority at the capital Pingcheng (平城, in modern Datong, Shanxi), assisted by the high-ranking official Qiumuling Shou (丘穆陵壽), to guard against a Rouran attack. However, Qiumuling, not believing that Rouran would actually attack, took little actual precautions, and when Rouran's Chilian Khan Yujiulü Wuti attacked, Pingcheng was caught nearly defenseless. Qiumuling wanted to escort Crown Prince Huang to the hills south of Pingcheng and take up defense position there, but at the opposition of Emperor Taiwu's wet nurse Empress Dowager Dou, Crown Prince Huang remained in Pingcheng, and when Northern Wei forces subsequently defeated Rouran forces, Yujiulü Wuti was forced to withdraw. (By this point, although he was only 11, Crown Prince Huang was apparently already participating in major military and policy decisions, as he had opposed his father's Northern Liang campaign, but was overruled by his father, who trusted Cui Hao's advice that Northern Liang was easily defeatable.)

By 442, Crown Prince Huang appeared to be already a devout Buddhist, and when his father, at the suggestion of Cui and the Taoist monk Kou Qianzhi, built the very high and difficult-to-construct Jinglun Palace (靜輪宮), he tried to oppose on account of cost, but Emperor Taiwu did not agree.

In 443, Crown Prince Huang accompanied his father on a campaign against Rouran, and when they suddenly encountered Yujiulü Wuti, Crown Prince Huang advised an immediate attack, but Emperor Taiwu hesitated, allowing Yujiulü Wuti to escape. From that point on, Emperor Taiwu began to listen to Crown Prince Huang's advice in earnest, and in winter 443, he authorized Crown Prince Huang to carry out all imperial duties except the most important ones, under assistance from Qiumuling, Cui, Zhang Li (張黎), and Tuxi Bi (吐奚弼). Crown Prince Huang soon instituted a policy to encourage farming—by mandatorily requiring those who had extra cattle to loan them to those without, to be animals of burden, with the lease being paid for by those without cattle by tilling the grounds of the cattle owners, increasing the efficiency of the farmlands greatly.

== After Emperor Taiwu's partial transfer of authority ==
In 446, while Emperor Taiwu was attacking the Lushuihu rebel Gai Wu (蓋吳), he found a large number of weapons in Buddhist temples in Chang'an. Believing that the monks were aligned with Gai, he slaughtered the monks in Chang'an. Cui Hao used this opportunity to encourage Emperor Taiwu to slaughter all monks throughout the empire and destroy the temples, statues, and sutras, and notwithstanding Kou Qianzhi's opposition, Emperor Taiwu proceeded to slaughter the monks in Chang'an, destroy the statues, and burn the sutras. He then issued an empire-wide prohibition of Buddhism. Crown Prince Huang, however, used delaying tactics in promulgating the edict, allowing Buddhists to flee or hide, but it was said that not a single Buddhist temple remained standing in Northern Wei. This was the first of the Three Disasters of Wu.

By 450, Crown Prince Huang appeared to be in direct conflict with Cui over administration of the state. When Cui recommended a number of men to be commandery governors, Crown Prince Huang objected strenuously, and yet the men were commissioned over his objection at Cui's insistence. It appeared that Crown Prince Huang had a hand when, later in 450, Cui was put to death with his entire clan, on account of having defamed imperial ancestors, as Crown Prince Huang argued hard to spare one of Cui's staff members, Gao Yun, and during that process, Gao gave some statements regarding Cui that could be viewed either as exculpatory or inculpatory.

In fall of 450, when Liu Song's Emperor Wen sent his general Wang Xuanmo (王玄謨) to attack Huatai (滑台, in modern Anyang, Henan), Emperor Taiwu personally led an army to relieve Huatai, and subsequently, after defeating Wang, advanced deeply into Liu Song territory, all the way to the Yangtze River. During Emperor Taiwu's campaign against Liu Song, pursuant to his instructions, Crown Prince Huang was on the northern border, defending against a potential Rouran attack.

== Death and aftermath ==
Crown Prince Huang was described to be highly observant, but trusting of his associates and also spending much effort on managing orchards and farms, to earn money from them. Gao Yun tried to advise him against engaging in commercial ventures and in overly delegating authorities, but he did not listen. Rather, in 451, he became embroiled in a conflict with the eunuch Zong Ai, whose corruption he had found out and whom he disliked immensely. Zong, apprehensive that Crown Prince Huang's trusted associates Chouni Daosheng (仇尼道盛) and Ren Pingcheng (任平城) would accuse him of crimes, acted pre-emptively and accused Chouni and Ren of crimes. In anger, Emperor Taiwu executed Chouni and Ren, and many other associates of Crown Prince Huang were entangled in the case and executed as well. In fear, Crown Prince Huang became ill and died.

Emperor Taiwu soon became aware that Crown Prince Huang was not involved in any crimes, and he regretted his actions greatly. Around the new year 451, he created Crown Prince Huang's oldest son Tuoba Jun the Prince of Gaoyang, but soon removed that title on the account that the crown prince's oldest son should not be a mere imperial prince—a strong sign that he was intending to create Tuoba Jun crown prince eventually. Zong, in fear that Emperor Taiwu would punish him, assassinated Emperor Taiwu in spring 452, and then seized power, killing a number of officials and Crown Prince Huang's younger brother Tuoba Han (拓跋翰) the Prince of Dongping, while making another younger brother of Crown Prince Huang's, Tuoba Yu the Prince of Nan'an emperor. Zong controlled the imperial regime, and when Tuoba Yu tried to assert his own power in fall 452, Zong assassinated him as well. Officials led by Yuan He, Baba Kehou (拔拔渴侯), Dugu Ni (獨孤尼), and Buliugu Li rose against Zong and killed him, making Tuoba Jun emperor, and Tuoba Jun, after he took the throne as Emperor Wencheng, posthumously honored Tuoba Huang as an emperor.

== Family ==
Consorts and Issue:

- Empress Gong, of the Yujiulü clan (恭皇后 鬱久閭氏)
  - Tuoba Jun, Emperor Wencheng (文成皇帝 拓跋濬; 440–465), first son
- Jiaofang, of the Yuan clan (椒房 袁氏)
  - Tuoba Xincheng, Prince You of Yangping (陽平幽王 拓跋新成; d. 470), second son
- Jiaofang, of the Wei clan (椒房 尉氏)
  - Tuoba Zitui, Prince Kang of Jingzhao (京兆康王 拓跋子推; d. 477)
  - Tuoba Xiaoxincheng, Prince Xuan of Jiyin (濟陰宣王 拓跋小新成; d. 467)
  - Tuoba Hu'er, Prince Kang of Leling (樂陵康王 拓跋胡兒; d. 468)
- Jiaofang, of the Yang clan (椒房 陽氏)
  - Tuoba Tianci, Prince Ling of Ruyin (汝陰靈王 拓跋天賜)
- Jiaofang, of the Meng clan (椒房 孟氏)
  - Tuoba Yun, Prince Kang of Rencheng (任城康王 拓跋云; 446–481)
  - Tuoba Xiu, Prince Jing of Anding (安定靖王 拓跋休; d. 494)
- Jiaofang, of the Liu clan (椒房 劉氏)
  - Tuoba Zhen, Prince Hui of Nan'an (南安惠王 拓跋楨; 447–496), 11th son
  - Tuoba Changshou, Prince Kang of Chengyang (城陽康王 拓跋長壽; d. 474)
- Jiaofang, of the Murong clan (椒房 慕容氏)
  - Tuoba Tailuo, Prince Jing of Zhangwu (章武敬王 拓跋太洛; d. 468)
- Unknown
  - Tuoba Wanshou, Prince Li Leliang (樂良厲王 拓跋萬壽; d. 462)
  - Tuoba Luohou, Prince Shang of Guangping (廣平殤王 拓跋洛侯; d. 461)
  - Tuoba Shen, Prince Zhao (趙王 拓跋深; d. 454)
  - Princess Zhangwu (章武公主), first daughter
    - Married Mu Tai (穆泰; d. 496), and had issue (two sons)
    - Married Fang Pusa (房菩薩)
  - Princess Anle (安樂公主) Second daughter
    - Married Yi Gangui of Henan, Prince Xiping (河南 乙乾歸; 445–475)
  - Princess Boling (博陵公主) Third daughter
    - Married Feng Xi of Changle, Prince Changli (長樂 馮熙; 438–495), and had issue (one son)
  - Princess Leping (樂平公主) Fourth daughter
    - Married Mr. Lü (閭), and had issue (one son)

== Ancestry ==
Tuoba Shi (d. 371)
Emperor Daowu of Northern Wei (371–409)
Empress Xianming (351–396)
Emperor Mingyuan of Northern Wei (392–423)
Liu Juan (d. 385)
Empress Xuanmu (d. 409)
Emperor Taiwu of Northern Wei (408–452)
Du Bao
Empress Mi (d. 420)
Lady Wei
Tuoba Huang (428–451)
Empress Jing'ai (d. 428)
Erzhu Yujian
Erzhu Yude
Lady Erzhu

== In popular culture ==
- Portrayed by Wang Yujing in the 2016 Chinese TV series The Princess Weiyoung.
