= Zong Ai =

Chinese eunuch and politician

- Traditional Chinese: 宗愛
- Simplified Chinese: 宗爱
Transcriptions
Standard Mandarin
- Hanyu Pinyin: Zōng Ài

Zong Ai (? - 31 October 452) was a eunuch who briefly came to great power in the Xianbei-led Chinese Northern Wei dynasty in 452 after assassinating Emperor Taiwu and making his son Tuoba Yu emperor.

== Biography ==
Little is known about Zong's career prior to 451. What is known is that he was punished with castration for unspecified crimes, and subsequent to his castration, he served in the Northern Wei palace as a eunuch. In spring 451, when Emperor Taiwu held a great gathering of imperial officials and handed out titles and other rewards for officials' accomplishments, Zong was created the Duke of Qing Commandery, but it is not known for what accomplishments he was created as such.

Later in 451, Zong came into conflict with Emperor Taiwu's crown prince Tuoba Huang. Crown Prince Huang had been considered able and all-seeing, but overly trusting of his associates, while privately managing farms and orchards and receiving profits from them. Crown Prince Huang greatly disliked Zong, who was described as corrupt and power hungry, and Zong decided to act first, accusing Crown Prince Huang's associates Chou'ni Daosheng (仇泥道盛) and Ren Pingcheng (任平城) of crimes, and Chou'ni and Ren were executed. Further, many other associates of Crown Prince Huang were dragged into the incident and executed. Crown Prince Huang himself "died of sadness" in summer 451. Soon, however, Emperor Taiwu found out that Crown Prince Huang was not guilty, and became heavily regretful of his actions in pursuing the crown prince's associates.

Fearful that he would be punished because of Crown Prince Huang's death, Zong assassinated Emperor Taiwu in spring 452. Initially, the officials Wuluolan Yan (烏洛蘭延), Suhe Pi (素和疋), and Chigan Ti (叱干提) did not announce news of Emperor Taiwu's death, as they considered whom to make Emperor Taiwu's successor. Because they considered Crown Prince Huang's son Tuoba Jun to be too young and wanted an older emperor, they summoned Emperor Taiwu's second son, Tuoba Han (拓跋翰) the Prince of Dongping to the palace. However, their discussions stalemated when Chigan insisted on making Tuoba Jun, who as the crown prince's older son would be the proper heir under the Confucian rules of succession, emperor. Zong heard this, and believing that he had already offended Tuoba Jun and disliking Tuoba Han, he secretly summoned Emperor Taiwu's youngest son Tuoba Yu, the Prince of Nan'an, to the palace, while forging an edict from Emperor Taiwu's wife Empress Helian to summon Wuluolan and a number of other officials, who did not suspect that anything was wrong and entered the palace. Upon their doing so, 30 eunuchs that Zong had armed arrested and executed them, as well as Tuoba Han. Zong then made Tuoba Yu emperor. Zong was created the Prince of Fengyi and made the commander of the armed forces, and he became the actual power in the regime.

In fall 452, displeased at how powerful and arrogant Zong had become, Tuoba Yu planned to strip him of his authority. Zong heard about this, and while Tuoba Yu was making a sacrifice to his great-grandfather Emperor Daowu at night, Zong sent his assistant Jia Zhou (賈周) to assassinate him. He then considered whom to make emperor to replace Tuoba Yu, and quickly rejected a suggestion by his associate Dugu Ni to make Tuoba Jun emperor, on the account that Tuoba Jun, once he was grown, would surely make Zong account for his father's death. Dugu then entered into a plot with other officials, Yuan He, Baba Kehou (拔拔渴侯), and Buliugu Li and rose against Zong, seizing him and making Tuoba Jun emperor. Both Zong and Jia were executed by the "Five Pains" method:

1. Their faces were tattooed.
2. Their noses were cut off.
3. Their big toes were cut off.
4. They were killed by repetitive whipping.
5. Their bodies were decapitated and then ground up.

Zong's and Jia's clans were also slaughtered.

Subsequent historians have pondered the unusual natures of Zong's crimes—that despite having assassinated two emperors, Zong was only accused by the coup leaders of having assassinated Tuoba Yu, not Emperor Taiwu. The officials' failure to arrest Zong or to announce Emperor Taiwu's death also led to speculation that Zong did not act alone. However, insufficient information is available to judge whether the speculations are correct.

== In popular culture ==
- Portrayed by Hou Ruixiang (侯瑞祥) in the 2016 Chinese TV series The Princess Weiyoung.
