= Empress Dowager Feng =

Chinese empress (442–490)

Empress Feng
- Born: 442
- Died: 490 (aged 47–48)
- Spouse: Emperor Wencheng of Northern Wei
Posthumous name
- Empress Wencheng Wenming 文成文明皇后
- Father: Feng Lang
- Mother: Lady Wang

Empress (Dowager) Feng (馮皇(太)后) (442 – 17 October 490), formally Empress (Dowager) Wenming (文明皇后, literally "the civil and understanding empress") was an empress of the Xianbei-led Northern Wei dynasty of China. Her husband was Emperor Wencheng. After her husband's death in 465, she overthrew the autocratic regent Yifu Hun in 466 and became regent over her stepson Emperor Xianwen and remained as such until his adulthood in 467. She subsequently had a falling-out with Emperor Xianwen (who had then become retired emperor) over his execution of her lover Li Yi (李奕), and she assassinated him and resumed regency over his son Emperor Xiaowen in 476. While Emperor Xiaowen assumed imperial powers upon adulthood, he remained very deferential to her, and she was highly influential until her death in October 490. An enduring legacy of her regency was a series of reforms that led to political recentralization for Northern Wei and future imperial dynasties.

== As empress ==
The later Empress Feng was born in 442, one of the granddaughters of Feng Hong (d. 438) the last emperor of Northern Yan. Her father, the 10th son of Feng Hong, was Feng Lang (馮朗) Duke of Xicheng and a provincial governor. Her mother was Lady Wang—it is unclear whether Lady Wang was Feng Lang's wife or concubine. Feng Lang, along with his brothers Feng Chong (馮崇) and Feng Miao (馮邈), had surrendered to Northern Wei in 433, after believing that they were in danger of being killed by their stepmother, Feng Hong's wife Princess Murong. Later, Feng Lang was executed after being accused of crimes during his governorship. As Feng Lang's daughter, the later empress was seized to serve in the palace, but she was raised by her aunt, Consort Feng, a concubine of Emperor Taiwu of Northern Wei (408–452). After Taiwu's assassination, his grandson Emperor Wencheng became emperor in 452, she became his concubine in 455, carrying the rank of Guiren (貴人). In 456, she was created empress; this was probably after she completed, as according to Northern Wei tradition, forging a golden statue, but there was no conclusive statement that she did so.

In 465, Emperor Wencheng died. He was succeeded by his 11-year-old son Tuoba Hong (454–476) the Crown Prince, as Emperor Xianwen, and Empress Feng was honored as empress dowager. Two days later, as according to Northern Wei custom, Emperor Wencheng's personal possessions were burned—and while the ceremony was conducted, Empress Feng, in sadness, jumped into the fire. She was saved by the guards. Meanwhile, political power soon fell into the hands of the official Yifu Hun, who proceeded to execute many other key officials and effectively assumed regency.

== As regent for Emperor Xianwen ==
In spring 466, however, Empress Dowager Feng staged a coup, probably in association with Tuoba Pi (拓拔丕) and Jia Xiu (賈秀), and Yifu Hun was arrested and executed. She assumed regency over the young Emperor Xianwen's regime, and she engaged Jia, Gao Yun, and Gao Lü (高閭) as her assistants in the regency. Later, she also incorporated her brother Feng Xi (馮熙) into the decision-making circle.

Empress Dowager Feng was soon presented with a major opportunity to expand Northern Wei territory, as also in 466, rival Liu Song had a major dynastic succession struggle after Liu Ziye was assassinated in January 466. Emperor Qianfei's uncle Emperor Ming of Song was declared emperor in the capital Jiankang, while his brother Liu Zixun the Prince of Jin'an was declared emperor in early 466 in Xunyang (尋陽, in modern Jiujiang, Jiangxi). After Emperor Ming's forces defeated Liu Zixun's and captured and executed Liu Zixun in fall 466, the Liu Song general Xue Andu (薛安都), the governor of Xu Province (徐州, modern northern Jiangsu and northern Anhui), who had initially declared for Liu Zixun, was apprehensive that he would be punished by Emperor Ming, and so decided to surrender to Northern Wei, and soon, he was joined by Bi Zhongjing (畢眾敬) the governor of Yan Province (兗州, modern western Shandong) and Chang Zhenqi (常珍奇) the governor of Ru'nan Commandery (汝南, roughly modern Zhumadian, Henan). Empress Dowager Feng sent the general Yuchi Yuan (尉遲元) to accept the surrenders of these Liu Song generals and to secure the region just north of the Huai River, and Yuchi subsequently defeated two attempts by Emperor Ming to recapture those provinces. She also sent the general Murong Baiyao (慕容白曜) to attack and try to capture Liu Song's Qing (青州, modern central and eastern Shandong) and Ji (冀州, modern northwestern Shandong) Provinces, which were cut off from the rest of Liu Song after Xue's defection, and by 469, both provinces fell into Northern Wei hands, and all of the regions north of the Huai River was by now Northern Wei territory.

In 467, Emperor Xianwen's concubine Consort Li bore his oldest child Tuoba Hong, and Empress Dowager Feng personally raised the young prince. She soon terminated her regency and returned imperial powers to Emperor Xianwen, who was 13 years old at this point.

== Between regencies ==
While Empress Dowager Feng was no longer regent, she appeared to remain fairly influential during the reign of her stepson Emperor Xianwen. However, in 470, an event occurred that would damage their relationship. Empress Dowager Feng had taken the official Li Yi (李奕) as her lover. In 470, the official Li Xin (李訢), who was a close friend of Li Yi's brother Li Fu (李敷), was accused of corruption, and Emperor Xianwen became aware of the accusations even though Li Fu tried to suppress the reports. He had known about his stepmother's relationship with Li Yi and, while he had not taken any actions against it at that point, disapproved of it. He sentenced Li Xin to death, but then informed Li Xin that if he could report on crimes that Li Fu and Li Yi had committed, he would be spared. After initial reluctance, Li Xin did so, and another man named Fan Biao (范標) also did so. Emperor Xianwen then executed Li Fu and Li Yi. Empress Dowager Feng became resentful of Emperor Xianwen after that point.

In 471, Emperor Xianwen yielded the imperial title to his four-year-old son Tuoba Hong (who took the throne as Emperor Xiaowen), and he himself took the title of Taishang Huang (retired emperor). However, he continued to have actual power in the imperial government. In 476, still resentful of Emperor Xianwen, Empress Dowager Feng killed him. (Most historians, including Sima Guang, believed that she poisoned him, but another version indicated that Empress Dowager Feng readied assassins who, when Emperor Xianwen came to her palace to greet her, seized and smothered him.) Empress Dowager Feng took on the title of grand empress dowager and re-assumed regency, over the nine-year-old Emperor Xiaowen.

== As regent for Emperor Xiaowen ==
Under the regent of Empress Dowager Feng, Emperor Xiaowen enacted a new land-tenure system named the equal-field system in 485, which was aimed at boosting agricultural production and tax receipts. The implementation of the equal-field system was largely due to the court's desire to break the economic power of local magnates who sheltered residents under their control living in fortified villages. Under this system, all land was owned by the state, and then equally distributed to taxpaying farmers. This system successfully created a stable fiscal infrastructure and a basis for universal military conscription for the Northern Wei, and continued well into the Tang dynasty. The equal-field program was coupled with another initiative, the "Three Elders" system, aimed at compiling accurate population registers so that land could be distributed accordingly.

After Grand Empress Dowager Feng re-assumed regency, she was said to be more dictatorial than she was before, but intelligent in her decisions and frugal in her living. Not only was she highly literate, but she also was capable in mathematics. However, she trusted several eunuchs and permitted them to interfere in governmental matters. Further, she greatly promoted her lovers Wang Rui (王叡) and Li Chong (李沖) - both of whom were apparently talented officials, but whose promotions were beyond what their talents and contributions called for. She balanced her reputation by also promoting some honored officials who were not her lovers. Because she was concerned that she would be criticized for what was seen as immoral conduct, she punished those whom she perceived to be criticizing her or parodying her behavior with severe punishment, including death. One of her victims was Li Xin, who had contributed to her prior lover Li Yi's death, as she had Li Xin put to death in 477. Fearful that Emperor Xiaowen's mother's clan would try to take power, she falsely accused his grandfather Li Hui (李惠) the Prince of Nan Commandery of treason in 478 and had him and his clan slaughtered. She apparently accelerated the policy of Sinicization, which included social stratification, as she issued an edict in 478 requiring people to marry in their social classes.

In 479, after rival Liu Song's throne was usurped by the general Xiao Daocheng, who established Southern Qi as its Emperor Gao, Northern Wei commissioned Liu Chang (劉昶) the Prince of Danyang, a Liu Song prince who had fled to Northern Wei in 465, with an army and promising him support to rebuild Liu Song. However, Liu Chang's abilities were not up to task, and he was never able to gain much following in the border regions to mount a major drive to reestablish Liu Song. By 481, the campaign had fizzled.

Also in 481, the Buddhist monk Faxiu (法秀) tried to start a popular uprising at the capital Pingcheng (平城, in modern Datong, Shanxi), but was discovered, captured, and executed. Some officials advocating the execution of all Buddhist monks, but Grand Empress Dowager Feng refused. Also that year, she started the building of her future tomb at Fang Mountain (方山), near Pingcheng, leaving instructions that after she died that it would be unnecessary for her to be buried with her husband Emperor Wencheng (who was buried near the old Northern Wei capital Shengle (盛樂, in modern Hohhot, Inner Mongolia). Later that year, a new criminal code that she commissioned Gao Lü to write was completed—with 832 sections, 16 of them prescribing clan-slaughter as penalty, 235 of them prescribing personal death penalty, and 377 prescribing other forms of punishment.

As the years went by, as Emperor Xiaowen grew in age, he appeared to gradually assume more and more power. Sometime during the process, Grand Empress Dowager Feng apparently became apprehensive of his abilities and therefore had him detained and considered deposing him in favor of his brother Tuoba Xi (拓拔禧), but after her attendants persuaded her otherwise, she did not carry out such actions. While Grand Empress Dowager Feng never formally returned imperial powers to him, by about 483 he appeared to be fairly in control of the government, although Grand Empress Dowager Feng continued to retain substantial powers. Indeed, it was by her order that that year, after Emperor Xiaowen's concubine Consort Lin bore his oldest son, Tuoba Xun, Consort Lin was forced to commit suicide pursuant to Northern Wei customs. She raised Tuoba Xun herself. In 485, after Emperor Xiaowen created his younger brothers princes, Grand Empress Dowager Feng established an imperial school for these princes. In 486, perhaps as both a sign of Sinicization and demonstration of Emperor Xiaowen's authority, he began to assume traditional Chinese imperial clothing, including a robe with dragon patterns and a tasseled hat.

The power-sharing arrangement between step-grandmother and step-grandson could perhaps be illustrated by an incident in 489, when Emperor Wencheng's younger brothers Tuoba Tianci (拓拔天賜) the Prince of Ruyin and Tuoba Zhen (拓拔楨) the Prince of Nan'an were accused of corruption, a death offense. Grand Empress Dowager Feng and Emperor Xiaowen jointly convened an imperial council to discuss their punishment. Grand Empress Dowager Feng opened by asking the officials, "Do you believe that we should care about familial relations and destroy law, or to disregard familial relations and follow the law?" The officials largely pleaded for the princes' lives. After Grand Empress Dowager Feng fell silent, Emperor Xiaowen stated: "What the two princes committed is unpardonable, but the Grand Empress Dowager takes after the brotherly love that Gaozong [Emperor Wencheng's temple name] had. Further, the Prince of Nan'an is filially pious toward his mother. Therefore, the two will be spared the death penalty, but their offices and titles will be stripped from them, and they will be reduced to commoner status with no political rights."

In 490, Grand Empress Dowager Feng died, and she was buried with magnificent honors, in the Yonggu Mausoleum. Emperor Xiaowen was so distraught that he was unable to take in food or water for five days, and subsequently observed a three-year mourning period for her, notwithstanding officials' pleas for him to shorten the mourning period in accordance with rules that Emperor Wen of Han had set.

== The 485–486 Reform ==
Together with Emperor Xiaowen, the Empress Dowager introduced two far-reaching policies. They were the "equal-field landholding system" and the "three-elder system". In the "equal-field system" (juntian-zhi) implemented in 485, the state redistributed uncultivated land to commoners attached with obligations of tax duty in the forms of grain, cloth, and labor service. Under this policy, each household was entitled to lands proportional to its labor power. Specifically, two types of land with tenure were granted to a household: the first was open land for crop cultivation (40 mu) for each adult male in the household, and half those amounts for females which was returnable after the recipient reached a specific advanced age or died. The second was the land to support textile production (10 or 20 mu), with the same gender distribution principle as open land in one of two forms, namely, "mulberry lands" in silk-producing areas, and "hemp lands" in regions where sericulture was impractical. Mulberry land was inheritable because of the long-term investment and care mulberry orchards required. Households possessing slaves and plow oxen were entitled to larger allocations. The open land allocations would be doubled or tripled in areas where the land was less fertile or the population sparse. Sale of these land grants was forbidden, although subleasing was possible under some circumstances. Land allocations would be adjusted annually to account for changes in household wealth.

Another policy was the establishment of the three-elders system (sanzhang-zhi) in 486. This policy was introduced to compile accurate population registers and enhance state control of the village population. Under this system, five households were to make up one neighborhood (li), headed by one neighborhood elder (linzhang) while five neighborhoods were grouped into a village and headed by one village elder (lizhang). Finally, over five villages, there was one ward elder (dangzhang). The three elders, appointed by the government, were responsible for detecting and re-registering population that fell otherwise outside of state accounts, requisitioning corvee labor, military conscripts, and taxes, and taking care of the poor and orphaned under their jurisdiction. This policy significantly bolstered the dynasty's control over the common people.

Empress Dowager Feng's reforms substantially increased agricultural production and tax receipts in the long run. They also weakened the economic power of local aristocrats who sheltered residents under their control living in fortified villages that scattered across the rural landscape of the northern China from taxation. Since the reforms, the Northern Wei dynasty had doubled the registered population to more than 5 million households.

These institutional infrastructures built by the Empress Dowager and Emperor Xiaowen survived the fall of the dynasty and laid the foundation for China's eventual unification in 589 AD under the Sui dynasty.

== In popular culture ==
- Portrayed by Jacklyn Wu in the 2006 Chinese TV series Empress Feng of the Northern Wei Dynasty
- Portrayed by Ning Jing in the 2010 Chinese TV series Hujia Hanyue
- Portrayed by Tiffany Tang in the 2016 Chinese TV series The Princess Weiyoung
- Portrayed by Wu Jinyan in the 2018 Chinese TV series Untouchable Lovers

Chinese royalty
Preceded by Empress Helian	Empress of Northern Wei; 456–465	Succeeded by Empress Feng Qing
