= Tuoba Yu =

Tuoba Yu 拓跋余

Emperor of Northern Wei
- Reign: 12 March - 29 October 452
- Predecessor: Emperor Taiwu
- Successor: Emperor Wencheng
- Died: 29 October 452
Full name
- Family name: Tuòbá (拓跋); Given name: Yú (余)
Era name and dates
- Chéngpíng (承平): 452
Posthumous name
- Prince Yin (隱王) (literary meaning: "hidden")
- House: Tuoba
- Dynasty: Northern Wei
- Father: Emperor Taiwu
- Mother: Lu Zuo Zhaoyi

Tuoba Yu (拓跋余) (died 29 October 452), posthumous name Prince Yin of Nan'an (南安隱王), Xianbei name Kebozhen (可博真; "The Gatekeeper"), was briefly an emperor of the Xianbei-led Chinese Northern Wei dynasty. He was placed on the throne by the eunuch Zong Ai after Zong assassinated his father Emperor Taiwu in spring 452, and Zong was largely in control of the regime during his reign. Later in the year, when Tuoba Yu tried to assert his own authority, Zong had him assassinated as well, but then was overthrown by a group of officials, who put Tuoba Yu's nephew Tuoba Jun (the son of Tuoba Yu's older brother, Tuoba Huang the Crown Prince, who had predeceased their father) on the throne as Emperor Wencheng.

== Background ==
It is not known when Tuoba Yu was born, but it is known that he was the youngest of Emperor Taiwu's six sons who survived childhood. His mother Consort Yujiulü (i.e. Lu Zuo Zhaoyi) was a sister of Rouran's Chilian Khan Yujiulü Wuti, who had become an imperial consort of Emperor Taiwu's as part of a peace-marriage arrangement in 434, whereby he married Consort Yujiulü while marrying his sister or cousin Princess Xihai to Yujiulü Wuti. He was created the Prince of Wu in 442, and 450, when his father was counter-attacking after a major Liu Song attack, and Crown Prince Huang was defending the northern borders against a potential Rouran attack, Prince Yu was left in charge of the capital Pingcheng (平城, in modern Datong, Shanxi), a sign that Emperor Taiwu trusted his abilities. In 452, his title was changed to Prince of Nan'an.

Sometime late in Emperor Taiwu's reign, Tuoba Yu became friendly with Emperor Taiwu's eunuch Zong Ai, who in 451 had falsely accused Crown Prince Huang's associates Chouni Daosheng (仇尼道盛) and Ren Pingcheng (任平城) of crimes, causing many members of Crown Prince Huang's staff to be executed and Crown Prince Huang himself to fall ill in fear and die. In spring 452, in fear that Emperor Taiwu would punish him, Zong assassinated Emperor Taiwu. The officials initially did not announce Emperor Taiwu's death, but were debating between whether to make Crown Prince Huang's oldest son Tuoba Jun or Emperor Taiwu's oldest surviving son Tuoba Han (拓跋翰) the Prince of Dongping emperor. Zong, who was also on poor terms with Tuoba Han, summoned Tuoba Yu to the palace instead, and forged an edict of Emperor Taiwu's wife Empress Helian to ambush and put the officials in favor of either Tuoba Jun or Tuoba Han to death. He then executed Tuoba Han as well and made Tuoba Yu emperor.

== Brief reign ==
Tuoba Yu honored Empress Helian as empress dowager, and he bestowed Zong a number of high level posts, including prime minister, making it clear that Zong was actually in control of the regime, as well as creating him the Prince of Fengyi. Tuoba Yu's ascension to the throne was apparently largely without major opposition, but he knew that he bypassed his older brothers, as well as his nephew (who by Confucian principles of succession should have been emperor), and therefore tried to gather officials' support by giving them rewards so large that the treasury was exhausted.

It was also described that Tuoba Yu drank often, and often spent time on entertainment and hunting, with little time for important matters of state. Zong, as prime minister, was in charge of imperial guards as well, and he became extremely arrogant. Eventually, Tuoba Yu grew tired of Zong's antics and planned to strip him of his authority. Zong heard about this, and in winter 452, while Tuoba Yu was making a sacrifice to his great-grandfather Emperor Daowu at night, Zong sent his assistant Jia Zhou (賈周) to assassinate him. He was on the throne for only slightly over seven months. Several officials subsequently overthrew Zong and made Tuoba Jun emperor (as Emperor Wencheng). Emperor Wencheng buried Tuoba Yu with honors due an imperial prince, but not due an emperor, and gave him a posthumous name.

== Era name ==
- Chengping (承平 chéng píng) 452

== In popular culture ==
- Portrayed by Vanness Wu in the 2016 Chinese TV series The Princess Weiyoung.

Regnal titles
Preceded by Emperor Taiwu of Northern Wei	Emperor of Northern Wei; 452	Succeeded by Emperor Wencheng of Northern Wei
