= Emperor Xiaowen of Northern Wei =

Emperor of Northern Wei Dynasty from 471 to 499

Emperor Xiaowen of Northern Wei 北魏孝文帝
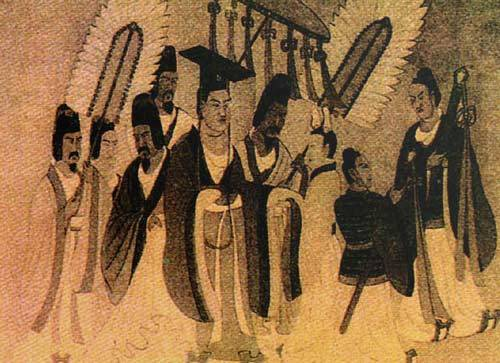

Emperor of Northern Wei
- Reign: September 20, 471 – April 26, 499
- Predecessor: Emperor Xianwen
- Successor: Emperor Xuanwu
- Regent: Empress Wencheng Wenming (until 490)
- Born: October 13, 467
- Died: April 26, 499 (aged 31)
- Burial: Chang Mausoleum (長陵)
- Consorts: Empress Feng of Changle; Empress You; Empress Wenzhao; Empress Zhen
- Issue: See § Family
Names
- Family name: Initially Tuòbá (拓跋), later Yuán (元, changed 496); Given name: Hóng (宏)
Era dates
- Yán xīng (延興) 471–476; Chéng míng (承明) 476; Tài hé (太和) 477–499
Posthumous name
- Emperor Xiàowén (孝文皇帝, lit. "filial and civil")
Temple name
- Gāozǔ (高祖)
- House: Yuan (Tuoba)
- Dynasty: Northern Wei
- Father: Emperor Xianwen
- Mother: Empress Si

Emperor Xiaowen of Northern Wei ((北)魏孝文帝) (October 13, 467 – April 26, 499), personal name Tuoba Hong (拓跋宏), later Yuan Hong (元宏), was an emperor of China's Northern Wei dynasty, reigning from September 20, 471 to April 26, 499.

Under the regent of Empress Dowager Feng, Emperor Xiaowen enacted a new land-tenure system named the equal-field system in 485, which was aimed at boosting agricultural production and tax receipts. The implementation of the equal-field system was largely due to the court's desire to break the economic power of local magnates who sheltered residents under their control living in fortified villages. Under this system, all land was owned by the state, and then equally distributed to taxpaying farmers. This system successfully created a stable fiscal infrastructure and a basis for universal military conscription for the Northern Wei, and continued well into the Tang dynasty. The equal-field program was coupled with another initiative, the "Three Elders" system, aimed at compiling accurate population registers so that land could be distributed accordingly.

Emperor Xiaowen implemented a policy of sinicization, intending to centralize the government and make the multi-ethnic state easier to govern. These policies included changing artistic styles to reflect Chinese preferences and forcing court officials to speak the language and to wear Chinese clothes. He compelled his own Xianbei people and others to adopt Chinese surnames, and changed his own family surname from Tuoba to Yuan. He also encouraged intermarriage between Xianbei and Han.

In 494, Emperor Xiaowen moved the Northern Wei capital from Pingcheng (平城, in modern Datong, Shanxi) to Luoyang, a city long acknowledged as a major center in Chinese history. While the capital was moved to Luoyang, the military elite remained centered at the old capital, widening the differences between the administration and the military. The population at the old capital remained conservative, while the population at Luoyang were much more eager to adopt Xiaowen's policies of sinicization. His reforms were met with resistance by the Xianbei elite. In 496, two plots by Xianbei nobles, one centered on his crown prince Yuan Xun, and one centered on his distant uncle Yuan Yi (元頤). By 497, Xiaowen had destroyed the conspiracies and forced Yuan Xun to commit suicide.

== Early life and regency of Emperor Xianwen ==
Tuoba Hong was born in 467, when his father Emperor Xianwen was himself young—at the age of 13, and not yet ruling by himself, but instead was emperor under the regency of Emperor Xianwen's stepmother Empress Dowager Feng. Tuoba Hong was Emperor Xianwen's oldest son. His mother, Consort Li, was the daughter of Li Hui, a mid-level official at the time, who was a brother of Emperor Xianwen's mother. Empress Dowager Feng, following Tuoba Hong's birth, ended her regency and returned power to Emperor Xianwen, while spending her time raising Tuoba Hong. In 469, at age two, Tuoba Hong was created crown prince. That same year, his mother Consort Li died—and while traditional histories did not describe how she died, it appeared likely that she was forced to commit suicide according to the Northern Wei tradition of forcing crown princes' mothers to commit suicide, for it was written that the entire palace mourned her bitterly.

In 471, Emperor Xianwen, who favored Taoist and Buddhist philosophies, tired of the throne, and considered passing the throne to his uncle Tuoba Zitui (拓跋子推) the Prince of Jingzhao. After opposition by virtually all high level officials, however, Emperor Xianwen was still resolved to pass the throne to someone else, but decided to instead yield the throne to Crown Prince Hong. He subsequently did so, and Crown Prince Hong took the throne as Emperor Xiaowen, while Emperor Xianwen took the title of Taishang Huang (retired emperor), although, due to Emperor Xiaowen's young age, Emperor Xianwen continued to be in actual control of important matters. When needed on the frontlines against Rouran, he conducted military campaigns himself, while leaving important officials in charge of the capital Pingcheng (平城, in modern Datong, Shanxi) with Emperor Xiaowen.

In 476, Empress Dowager Feng, resentful that Emperor Xianwen had put her lover Li Yi (李奕) to death in 470, had him assassinated. (Most historians, including Sima Guang, believed that she poisoned him, but another version indicated that Empress Dowager Feng readied assassins who, when Emperor Xianwen came to her palace to greet her, seized and smothered him.) She assumed regency over Emperor Xiaowen and assumed the title of Grand Empress Dowager.

== Regency of Grand Empress Dowager Feng ==
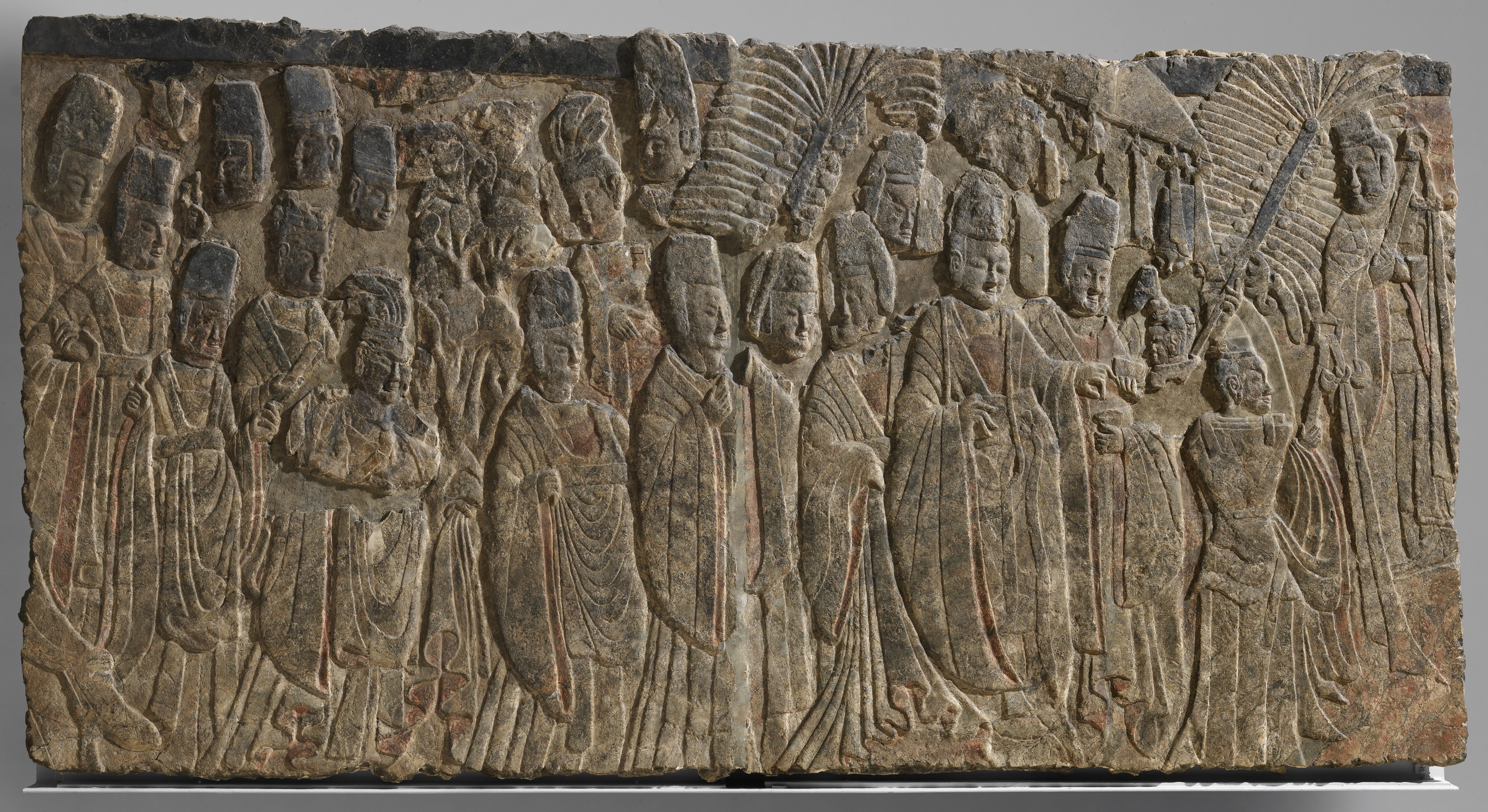
Emperor Xiaowen and his entourage worshipping the Buddha 522-523 CE. Central Binyang Cave (also known as Cave 3) in the Longmen complex

After Grand Empress Dowager Feng re-assumed regency, she was said to be more dictatorial than she was before, but intelligent in her decisions and frugal in her living. Not only was she highly literate, but she also was capable in mathematics. However, she trusted several eunuchs and permitted them to interfere in governmental matters. Further, she greatly promoted her lovers Wang Rui (王叡) and Li Chong (李沖) – both of whom were apparently talented officials, but whose promotions were beyond what their talents and contributions called for. She balanced her reputation by also promoting some honored officials who were not her lovers. Because she was concerned that she would be criticized for what was seen as immoral conduct, she punished those whom she perceived to be criticizing her or parodying her behavior with severe punishment, including death. One of her victims was Li Xin, who had contributed to her prior lover Li Yi's death, as she had Li Xin put to death in 477. Fearful that Emperor Xiaowen's mother's clan would try to take power, she falsely accused his grandfather Li Hui (李惠) the Prince of Nan Commandery of treason in 478 and had him and his clan slaughtered. She apparently accelerated the policy of Sinicization, which included social stratification, as she issued an edict in 478 requiring people to marry in their social classes.

The Northern Wei started to arrange for Han Chinese elites to marry daughters of the Xianbei Tuoba royal family in the 480s. Some Han Chinese exiled royalty fled from southern China and defected to the Xianbei. Several daughters of the Xianbei Emperor Xiaowen were married to Han Chinese elites, the Han Chinese Liu Song royal Liu Hui 刘辉, married Princess Lanling 蘭陵公主 of the Northern Wei, Princess Huayang 華陽公主 to Sima Fei 司馬朏, a descendant of Jin dynasty (266–420) royalty, Princess Jinan 濟南公主 to Lu Daoqian 盧道虔, Princess Nanyang 南阳长公主 to Xiao Baoyin 萧宝夤, a member of Southern Qi royalty. Emperor Xiaozhuang of Northern Wei's sister the Shouyang Princess was wedded to The Liang dynasty ruler Emperor Wu of Liang's son Xiao Zong 蕭綜.

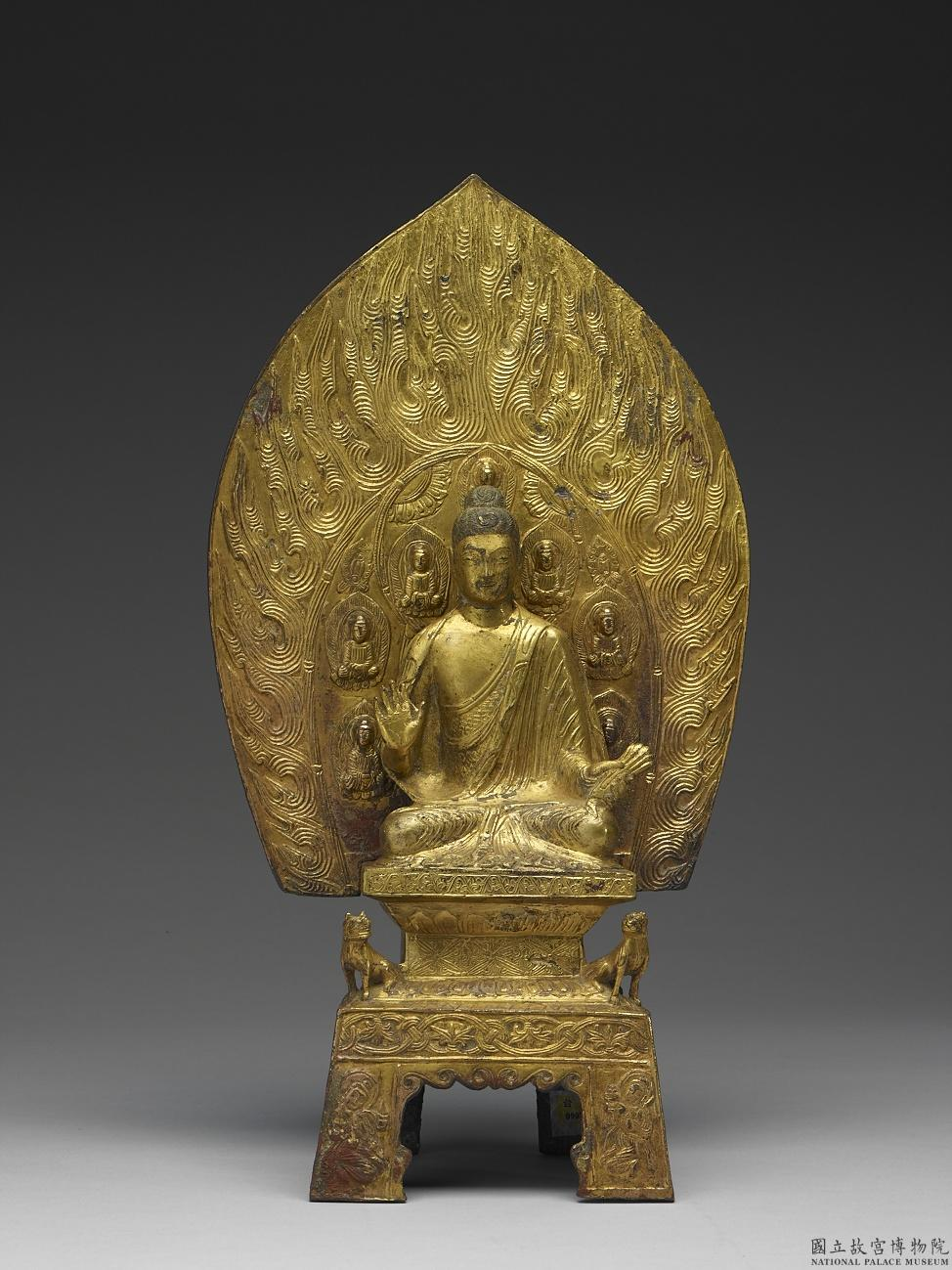
Gilt bronze Sakyamuni Buddha dated to the tenth day of the ninth lunar month of the first year of the Taihe era (477). Today it is the National Tresure of the Republic of China exhibited at the National Palace Museum

In 479, after rival Liu Song's throne was usurped by the general Xiao Daocheng, who established Southern Qi as its Emperor Gao, Northern Wei commissioned Liu Chang (劉昶) the Prince of Danyang, a Liu Song prince who had fled to Northern Wei in 465, with an army and promising him support to rebuild Liu Song. However, Liu Chang's abilities were not up to task, and he was never able to gain much following in the border regions to mount a major drive to reestablish Liu Song. By 481, the campaign had fizzled.

Also in 481, the Buddhist monk Faxiu (法秀) tried to start a popular uprising at Pingcheng, but was discovered, captured, and executed. Some officials advocating the execution of all Buddhist monks, but Grand Empress Dowager Feng refused. Also that year, she started the building of her future tomb at Fang Mountain (方山), near Pingcheng, leaving instructions that after she died that it would be unnecessary for her to be buried with her husband Emperor Wengcheng, who was buried near the old Northern Wei capital Shengle (盛樂, in modern Hohhot, Inner Mongolia). Later that year, a new criminal code that she commissioned Gao Lü to write was completed—with 832 sections, 16 of them prescribing clan-slaughter as penalty, 235 of them prescribing personal death penalty, and 377 prescribing other forms of punishment.

Sometime during Emperor Xiaowen's rise to power, Grand Empress Dowager Feng had him detained and considered deposing him in favor of his brother Tuoba Xi (拓跋禧), but her attendants persuaded her otherwise. While Grand Empress Dowager Feng never formally returned imperial powers to him, by about 483 he appeared to be fairly in control of the government, although Grand Empress Dowager Feng continued to retain substantial powers. Indeed, it was by her order that that year, after Emperor Xiaowen's concubine Consort Lin bore his oldest son, Tuoba Xun, Consort Lin was forced to commit suicide pursuant to Northern Wei customs. She raised Tuoba Xun herself. In 485, after Emperor Xiaowen created his younger brothers princes, Grand Empress Dowager Feng established an imperial school for these princes. In 486, perhaps as both a sign of Sinicization and demonstration of Emperor Xiaowen's authority, he began to assume traditional Chinese imperial clothing, including a robe with dragon patterns and a tasseled hat. As Emperor Xiaowen was raised by Grand Empress Dowager Feng, he also became very close to the family of her brother Feng Xi (馮熙). For some time, he took two of his daughters as concubines, but one of them soon died of illness, and the other, Consort Feng Run, also suffered a major illness and was sent back to her father house, where she became a Buddhist nun.

The power-sharing arrangement between stepgrandmother and stepgrandson could perhaps be illustrated by an incident in 489, when Emperor Wencheng's younger brothers Tuoba Tianci (拓跋天賜) the Prince of Ruyin and Tuoba Zhen (拓跋楨) the Prince of Nan'an were accused of corruption, a death offense. Grand Empress Dowager Feng and Emperor Xiaowen jointly convened an imperial council to discuss their punishment. Grand Empress Dowager Feng opened by asking the officials, "Do you believe that we should care about familial relations and destroy law, or to disregard familial relations and follow the law?" The officials largely pleaded for the princes' lives. After Grand Empress Dowager Feng fell silent, Emperor Xiaowen stated: "What the two princes committed is unpardonable, but the Grand Empress Dowager takes after the brotherly love that Gaozong [Emperor Wengcheng's Temple name] had. Further, the Prince of Nan'an is filially pious toward his mother. Therefore, the two will be spared the death penalty, but their offices and titles will be stripped from them, and they will be reduced to commoner status with no political rights."

In 490, Grand Empress Dowager Feng died, and she was buried with magnificent honors. Emperor Xiaowen was so distraught that he was unable to take in food or water for five days, and subsequently observed a three-year mourning period for her, notwithstanding officials' pleas for him to shorten the mourning period in accordance with rules that Emperor Wen of Han had set.

== Early personal reign ==
After Grand Empress Dowager Feng's death, Emperor Xiaowen not only continued the sinicization campaign, but carried it out in earnest, changing many laws and customs of the Northern Wei states to conform with Han, particularly Confucian, customs. While he sought out his mother Consort Li's cousins (Consort Li's brothers had been executed with their father Li Hui) and rewarded them with relatively low offices, he later retracted the rewards, bringing criticism that he was treating the Fengs with too much kindness and not treating the Lis with sufficient kindness.

in 492, in conformance with past dynasties' tradition, Emperor Xiaowen demoted the many princes in the state, unless they were descendants of the dynasty founder Emperor Daowu, to the titles of duke, with two exceptions: Baba Guan (拔拔觀) the Prince of Shangdang, because of the great accomplishments of his grandfather Baba Daosheng (拔拔道生), was allowed to remain prince; and the former Liu Song prince Liu Chang the Prince of Danyang, while having his own rank reduced to Duke of Qi Commandery, was given a special title, which appeared to be non-inheritable, of Prince of Song.

In 493, Emperor Xiaowen married another daughter of Feng Xi, Feng Qing, as empress.

Also in 493, Emperor Xiaowen began the first of a number of campaigns that he would conduct against Southern Qi – although in the case of this campaign, it was intended to instead allow him to move the capital from Pingcheng south to the Han heartland of Luoyang, to further his sinicization campaign. As he reached Luoyang in the late fall, he ordered a continued advance despite heavy rains, and then, when the Xianbei officials who opposed the campaign tried again to stop him, he offered a compromise—that the capital be moved to Luoyang, and the campaign be abandoned. The officials agreed. He also entrusted the matters of changing Xianbei ceremonies and music to Han ceremonies to the official Wang Su (王肅), who had only recently defected from Southern Qi.

in 494, Emperor Xiaowen made a return to Pingcheng, and, for reasons that are not clear, reopened the discussions on whether to move the capital to Luoyang. This time, the Xianbei officials largely opposed the move, but Emperor Xiaowen overruled them and continued moving the governmental agencies to Luoyang, although maintaining a fairly substantial governmental presence at Pingcheng for it to serve as the secondary capital. To alleviate the concerns that the move from Pingcheng to Luoyang would cause a supply shortage of horses and other livestock, he had the general Yuwen Fu (宇文福) set up a large livestock grazing zone at Heyang (河陽, in modern Jiaozuo and Xinxiang, Henan).

A fief of 100 households and the rank of 崇聖侯 Marquis who worships the sage was bestowed upon a Confucius descendant, Yan Hui's lineage had 2 of its scions and Confucius's lineage had 4 of its scions who had ranks bestowed on them in Shandong in 495 and a fief of ten households and rank of 崇聖大夫 Grandee who venerates the sage was bestowed on 孔乘 Kong Sheng who was Confucius's scion in the 28th generation in 472 by Emperor Xiaowen of Northern Wei.

== Late personal reign ==
Late in 494, under the stated reason that Southern Qi's Emperor Ming had usurped the throne (from his grandnephew Xiao Zhaowen), Emperor Xiaowen prepared a major campaign against Southern Qi, departing Luoyang about new year 495. He initially put the important cities Shouyang (壽陽, in modern Lu'an, Anhui) and Yiyang (義陽, in modern Xinyang, Henan) under siege, but could not capture them easily, and battles that his armies conducted against Southern Qi armies were largely indecisive. By late spring 495, he abandoned the campaign.

In summer 495, Emperor Xiaowen issued a number of edicts that made what was stated policy official law—that Xianbei clothing and language be prohibited, and that the Han clothing and language be used instead. (An exemption was given to those over 30.) In spring 496, he also ordered that the Xianbei family names be changed to Han ones, changing his own clan's name from Tuoba to Yuan. He also strengthened the social stratification that had already been underway for some time, making eight Xianbei clans and five Han clans particularly honored, and ordering that all political offices be given by clan status, not by abilities, despite heavy opposition by his official Li Chong. The particularly honored clans were:

- Xianbei
  - Mu (穆, originally Qiumuling)
  - Lu (陸, originally Buliugu)
  - He (賀, originally Helai)
  - Liu (劉, originally Dugu)
  - Lou (樓, originally Helou)
  - Yu (于, originally Wuniuyu)
  - Xi (奚, originally Daxi)
  - Yu (尉, originally Yuchi)
- Han
  - Lu (盧)
  - Cui (崔)
  - Zheng (鄭)
  - Wang (王)
  - Li (李)

Emperor Xiaowen went as far as ordering his six younger brothers to demote their current wives to concubine status, and taking the daughters of officials from the five Han clans to be their new wives, an action heavily criticized by historians.

Sometime prior to fall 496, Emperor Xiaowen had, perhaps due to recommendation from Empress Feng, welcomed her older sister Feng Run back to the palace to again be his concubine, and Feng Run, believing herself to be the older sister, refused to yield to Empress Feng and began to find ways to undermine her position. In summer 496, Emperor Xiaowen deposed Empress Feng, who then went to Yaoguang Temple (瑤光寺) and became a Buddhist nun.

Also in fall 496, the crown prince Yuan Xun, who did not adjust well to Han customs or the much hotter weather in Luoyang, plotted with his followers to flee back to Pingcheng, perhaps to hold that city against his father. His plot, however, was discovered, and Emperor Xiaowen, after asking his brother Yuan Xi (元禧) the Prince of Xianyang to cane Yuan Xun with him, deposed Yuan Xun. However, a second plot quickly arose, organized by the officials Mu Tai (穆泰) and Lu Rui (陸叡), who intended to again hold the northern regions against the Emperor. However, their plot was revealed by Emperor Xiaowen's distant uncle Yu Yi (元頤) the Prince of Yangping, whom they had intended to make their leader but who had only pretended to go along with their plot. Emperor Xiaowen sent a force commanded by his cousin Yuan Cheng (元澄) the Prince of Rencheng to Pingcheng, putting down the plot before it started in earnest, and putting Mu and Lu to death.

In spring 497, Emperor Xiaowen created another son, Yuan Ke, crown prince. Believing in reports by the official Li Biao (李彪), who then had the former Crown Prince Xun under house arrest, that Yuan Xun was still plotting rebellion, he forced Yuan Xun to commit suicide. In fall 497, Emperor Xiaowen created Feng Run to be empress, and when Yuan Ke's mother Consort Gao subsequently died, common belief was that Empress Feng had her secretly poisoned so that she could raise Yuan Ke herself.

Also in fall 497, Emperor Xiaowen launched another major attack against Southern Qi, this time first concentrating on the city Wancheng (宛城, in modern Nanyang, Henan). While he was able to capture Wancheng and Xinye (新野, also in modern Nanyang), the battles were still largely indecisive. During his absence, a major conflict erupted between Li Chong and Li Biao in the capital Luoyang, and Li Chong, after putting Li Biao under arrest, died in anger. Partly because of this and partly because, once Southern Qi's Emperor Ming died in fall 498, that he should not continue to attack a country that was mourning for its emperor, he ended the campaign in fall 498. At that same time, he himself was falling ill, and he entrusted the important matters to his brother Yuan Xie the Prince of Pengcheng, although he subsequently recovered and was able to return to Luoyang.

Meanwhile, however, in Emperor Xiaowen's absence, Empress Feng had been carrying on an affair with the attendant Gao Pusa (高菩薩). When she, also in Emperor Xiaowen's absence, tried to force Emperor Xiaowen's sister Princess Pengcheng, whose husband Liu Chengxu (劉承緒, Liu Chang's son) had died earlier, to marry her brother Feng Su (馮夙) the Duke of Beiping, Princess Pengcheng fled out of Luoyang and arrived at Emperor Xiaowen's camp, accusing Empress Feng of adultery. Once Emperor Xiaowen arrived back in Luoyang, he arrested Gao and Empress Feng's assistant Shuang Meng (雙蒙) and interrogated them. He then interrogated Empress Feng personally as well, concluding that she had in fact committed adultery. However, claiming that he did not want to shame the Feng clan, he did not depose her, but refused to see her again and also ordered Crown Prince Ke not to see her again either.

Emperor Xiaowen, despite his own weakened physical state, then decided to again advance south to react against a retaliation campaign by the Southern Qi general Chen Xianda (陳顯達). He was able to repel and defeat Chen, but while on the campaign, he died. Yuan Xie and Yuan Cheng kept his death secret until his body could be returned to Luoyang, and then announced his death. Yuan Ke succeeded to the throne as Emperor Xuanwu. By Emperor Xiaowen's will, Empress Feng was forced to commit suicide.

== Family ==
=== Consorts and issue ===
- Empress, of the Feng clan of Changle (皇后 長樂馮氏), personal name Qing (清)
- Empress You, of the Feng clan of Changle (幽皇后 長樂馮氏; 469–499), personal name Run (潤)
- Empress Wenzhao, of the Gao clan of Goguryeo (文昭皇后 高句麗高氏; 469–497), personal name Zhaorong (照容)
  - Yuan Ke, Emperor Xuanwu (宣武皇帝 元恪; 483–515), second son
  - Yuan Huai, Emperor Wumu (武穆皇帝 元懷; 488–517), fifth son
  - Princess Changle (長樂公主; 489–525), personal name Ying (瑛)
    - Married Gao Meng of Goguryeo, Duke Bohai (高句麗 高猛; 483–523)
- Empress Zhen, of the Lin clan (貞皇后 林氏; d. 483)
  - Yuan Xun, Crown Prince (皇太子 元恂; 483–497), first son
- Guiren, of the Yuan clan (貴人 袁氏)
  - Yuan Yu, Emperor Wenjing (文景皇帝 元愉; 488–508), third son
- Furen, of the Luo clan (夫人 羅氏; d. 514)
  - Yuan Yi, Prince Wenxian of Qinghe (清河文獻王 元懌; 488–520), fourth son
  - Yuan Yue, Prince Wenxuan of Runan (汝南文宣王 元悅; 494–532), sixth son
- Chonghua, of the Zheng clan ，personal name Muji (穆姬)
  - Yuan Tiao, (元恌; 494–500), seventh son
- Chonghua, of the Zhao clan (充華 趙氏; 467–514)
  - Princess Yiyang (義陽公主)
    - Married Lu Yuanyu of Fanyang (范陽 盧元聿), and had issue (one son)
- Unknown
  - Princess Lanling (蘭陵公主), second daughter
    - Married Liu Hui, Duke Qi (劉輝; d. 521)
  - Princess Huaiyang (淮陽公主), fourth daughter
    - Married Yi Yuan of Henan (河南 乙瑗; 489–534), and had issue (one son, Lady Yifu)
  - Princess Huayang (華陽公主; d. 524)
    - Married Sima Fei of Henei, Viscount Yuyang (河內 司馬朏; d. 524), and had issue (one son)
  - Princess Shunyang (順陽公主)
    - Married Feng Mu of Changle, Duke Fufeng (長樂 馮穆; d. 528)
  - Princess Jinan (濟南公主)
    - Married Lu Daoqian of Fanyang, Count Linzi (范陽 盧道虔), and had issue (two sons)
  - Princess Nanyang (南陽公主)
    - Married Xiao Baoyin of Lanling (蘭陵; 487–530) in 502, and had issue (three sons)

== In popular culture ==
- Portrayed by Zhang Bowen in the 2018 Chinese TV series Untouchable Lovers.

== See also ==
- Change of Xianbei names to Han names

Regnal titles
Preceded by Emperor Xianwen of Northern Wei	Emperor of Northern Wei; 471–499	Succeeded by Emperor Xuanwu of Northern Wei
