= Emperor Wencheng of Northern Wei =

Emperor Wencheng of Northern Wei 北魏文成帝
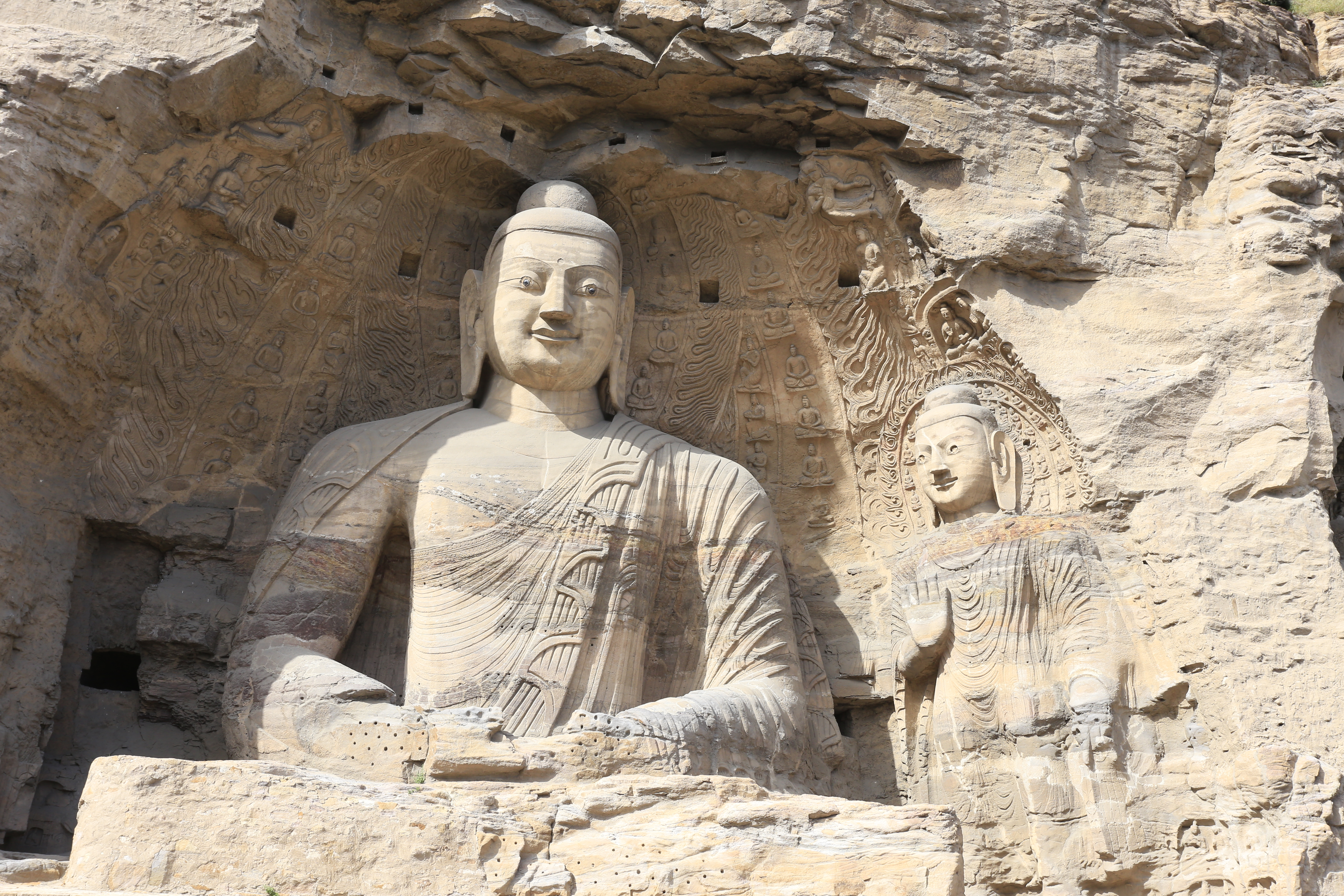
- Grotto No. 20 of Yungang Grottoes is believed to be a depiction of Emperor Wencheng of Northern Wei

Emperor of Northern Wei
- Reign: October 31, 452 – June 20, 465
- Predecessor: Tuoba Yu
- Successor: Emperor Xianwen
- Born: August 4, 440
- Died: June 20, 465 (aged 24)
- Burial: Jin Mausoleum of Yunzhong (雲中金陵)
- Consorts: Empress Wenming; Empress Yuan
- Issue: Emperor Xianwen; Tuoba Changle; Tuoba Lüe; Tuoba Jian; Tuoba Ruo; Tuoba Meng; Princess Xihe
Full name
- Family name: Tuòbá (拓跋); Given name: Jùn (俊)
Era dates
- Xīng'ān (興安) (452-454); Xīngguāng (興光) (454-455); Tài'ān (太安) (455-459); Hépíng (和平) (460-465)
Posthumous name
- Emperor Wénchéng (文成皇帝, "civil and successful")
Temple name
- Gāozōng (高宗)
- House: Tuoba
- Dynasty: Northern Wei
- Father: Tuoba Huang
- Mother: Empress Gong

Emperor Wencheng of Northern Wei ((北)魏文成帝) (4 August 440 – 20 June 465), Han name Tuoba Jun (拓跋濬), Xianbei name Wulei (烏雷), was an emperor of the Xianbei-led Northern Wei dynasty of China. He became emperor aged 12 in the aftermath of the eunuch Zong Ai's assassinations of his grandfather Emperor Taiwu and uncle Tuoba Yu, and he was generally described by historians as a ruler who sought foremost to allow his people to rest after his grandfather's expansionist policies and extensive campaigns, and who also reformed the laws to become more lenient.

== Background ==
Tuoba Jun was born in 440, when his father Tuoba Huang was the crown prince of his grandfather, Emperor Taiwu. (Some historical sources give his birthdate as 448, a date that appears rather unlikely because that would make him only six years older than his son, Emperor Xianwen.) His mother, Consort Yujiulü, was the sister of the general Yujiulü Pi (郁久閭毗), who had been a member of the Rouran royal house but who had surrendered to Northern Wei. When he was little, he was much favored by his grandfather Emperor Taiwu, and often accompanied Emperor Taiwu, even on military campaigns. While he carried no official titles, he was known as the Prime Imperial Grandson (嫡皇孫). Around the new year 452, after his father Tuoba Huang had died in 451 after falling ill over his fear of false accusations by the eunuch Zong Ai, Emperor Taiwu created him the Prince of Gaoyang, but then reconsidered, believing that a princely title was inappropriate for his oldest grandson, and therefore cancelled the title—signifying strongly that he intended for Tuoba Jun to succeed him.

However, Zong Ai, in fear that Emperor Taiwu would punish him over his false accusations against Crown Prince Huang, assassinated Emperor Taiwu in spring 452, and, skipping over Tuoba Jun, made Tuoba Huang's younger brother Tuoba Yu the Prince of Nan'an emperor. Zong controlled all important matters of state, and when Tuoba Yu, displeased about Zong's arrogance, tried to strip him of power in fall 452, Zong assassinated him as well. The officials Dugu Ni (獨孤尼), Yuan He, Baba Kehou (拔拔渴侯), and Buliugu Li, however, then overthrew Zong and executed him, making Tuoba Jun emperor at the age of 12, as Emperor Wencheng.

== Early reign ==
Immediately following Emperor Wencheng's taking the throne, it appeared that the high-level officials began internecine struggles against each other, as for several years officials would be put into honored positions, only to be executed days or months later. These included senior officials held over from Emperor Taiwu's administration as well as those who had accomplished much in putting Emperor Wencheng on the throne, and included:

- Tuoba Shoule (拓跋壽樂), chief commander (winter 452)
- Baba Kehou, a major participant in the coup bringing Emperor Wencheng to the throne (winter 452)
- Tuxi Bi (吐奚弼), prime minister under Tuoba Yu (winter 452)
- Zhang Li (張黎), chief commander under Tuoba Yu (winter 452)
- Tuoba Zhouniu (拓跋周忸) the Prince of Leling, chief commander (winter 452)
- Duguhun Yuanbao (獨孤渾元寶) the Prince of Jingzhao (spring 453)
- Tuoba Chong (拓跋崇) the Prince of Jianning, Emperor Wencheng's granduncle, and his son Tuoba Li (拓跋麗) the Prince of Ji'nan (spring 453)
- Yujiulü Ruowen (郁久閭若文) the Prince of Puyang (fall 453)
- Tuoba Ren (拓跋仁) the Prince of Yongchang, Emperor Wencheng's cousin (fall 453)
- Tuoba Ba (拓跋拔) the Prince of Leping, Emperor Wencheng's cousin (spring 455)

It appeared that Yuan He and Buliugu Li were the key victors out of these struggles, for not only did they not suffer during the infighting, but became exceedingly honored late in Emperor Wencheng's reign. Both they and Dugu Ni were created princes. Whether Emperor Wencheng himself was involved in these internecine struggles is unclear, although the edicts were issued in his name. Yuchi Juan (尉遲眷), already a decorated general during Emperor Taiwu's reign, also became powerful.

Another characteristic of Emperor Wencheng's reign was that he often toured the provinces throughout his empire. He also frequently issued partial amnesties to the people of the capital Pingcheng.

In winter 452, Emperor Wencheng's mother Consort Yujiulü died, and he subsequently posthumously honored his parents as emperor and empress.

Around the new year 453, Emperor Wencheng, a Buddhist, officially ended the prohibitions against Buddhism that Emperor Taiwu had instituted in 445 (which became known as the first of Three Disasters of Wu), and he personally performed tonsure on five monks. However, as per the traditions instituted by Emperor Taiwu, he also publicly received Taoist amulets in spring 454.

In spring 453, Emperor Wencheng honored his wet nurse Lady Chang as empress dowager, and treated her brothers as if they were his biological uncles.

In fall 454, Emperor Wencheng's concubine Consort Li gave birth to his oldest son Tuoba Hong. In 456, he created another imperial consort, Consort Feng, empress and created Tuoba Hong crown prince—and then, pursuant to Northern Wei tradition, ordered Tuoba Hong's mother Consort Li to commit suicide.

In early 458, Emperor Wencheng, frustrated by how drunk and rowdy people would criticise the imperial government, enacted a prohibition on alcohol. He banned the brewing, drinking, buying and selling of alcohol, with violators punished by death. However, on special occasions, alcohol would be allowed for a fixed amount of time. At this time, he introduced incognito supervision for officials to monitor their actions. However, officials became afraid and increased investigations, yet the officials also made many false accusations, and would be tried for disrespect. Emperor Wencheng also added clauses to the legal code of Emperor Taiwu that had been formulated in 451. Of these clauses, 13 crimes were punished by execution of the offender's clan, 35 punished by execution of just the offender, and 62 mandated lesser punishments.

In winter 458, Emperor Wencheng launched a major attack against Rouran, but considered abandoning it when his troops encountered a snow storm. At Yuchi Juan's urging (arguing that a withdrawal would unduly signal weakness to Rouran), however, Emperor Wencheng continued, and while he was not able to deal a major defeat to Rouran's Chuluo Khan Yujiulü Tuhezhen, a number of Rouran tribesmen surrendered. Meanwhile, in his absence, his generals Feng Chiwen (封敕文) and Pi Baozi (皮豹子) engaged Liu Song forces near the Ji River (濟水, the route of which had been overtaken by the Yellow River in modern times), with inconclusive results.

In 453, during the political struggles of Emperor Wencheng's early reign, the political figures at the time had imposed 15 additional levies as well as regular taxes, which were considered troubling and burdensome. During the middle years of his reign, despite opposition from officials who worried that the treasury would not be sufficient without them, Emperor Wencheng removed all of these additional levies, though he restored them soon after, and they would not be permanently abolished until the reign of his successor Emperor Xianwen.

== Late reign ==
In summer 460, Emperor Wencheng's wet nurse Empress Dowager Chang died.

Also in summer 460, based on advice given by Cao An (曹安) the Marquess of Dingyang, Emperor Wencheng launched a major attack on Tuyuhun's khan Murong Shiyin (慕容拾寅), who had drawn Northern Wei officials' ire by accepting commissions by both Northern Wei and Liu Song and by showing off his wealth. The commanding generals were Emperor Wencheng's brother Tuoba Xincheng (拓跋新成) the Prince of Yangping and Li Hui (李惠) the Duke of Nan Commandery. However, while the armies were able to capture a large number of livestock, Murong Shiyin received advance warning and was able to flee into the mountains, and the armies also suffered from illnesses.

In 461, Emperor Wencheng had grown frustrated by how many local officials would force the people to loan them money and then trade it with merchants to make profits at tax collection. He issued an edict to strictly abolish this and harshly punish the practice. Also that year, he decreed that those over the age of eighty would have one son exempt from government service.

In 464, while on one of his tours to various parts of the empire, Emperor Wencheng personally attended a Gaoche tribal ceremony to sacrifice to the heavens, and the Gaoche people were very pleased. Also that year, he decreed that people in the capital aged 70 or over would be provided food by the major official bureaus until their deaths.

In summer 465, Emperor Wencheng died and was succeeded by his son Tuoba Hong (as Emperor Xianwen). Power soon fell into the hands of the official Yifu Hun, who tried to monopolize power and executed a number of other officials, including Buliugu Li, but in 466 was in turn ambushed by Emperor Wencheng's wife Empress Dowager Feng.

== Family ==
=== Consorts and issue ===
- Empress Wenming, of the Changle Feng clan (文明皇后 長樂馮氏; 441–490)
- Empress Yuan, of the Dunqiu Li clan (元皇后 頓丘李氏; d. 456)
  - Tuoba Hong, Emperor Xianwen (獻文皇帝 拓跋弘; 454–476), first son
- Furen, of the Li clan (夫人 李氏)
  - Tuoba Changle, Prince Li of Anle (安樂厲王 拓跋長樂; d. 479), second son
- Furen, of the Cao clan (夫人 曹氏)
  - Tuoba Lüe, Prince Zhuang Guangchuan (廣川莊王 拓跋略; d. 480), third son
- Furen, of the Juqu clan (夫人 沮渠氏)
  - Tuoba Jian, Prince Qishun (齊順王 拓跋簡; 460–499), fourth son
- Furen, of the Yi clan (夫人 乙氏)
  - Tuoba Ruo, Prince Xiao Hejian (河間孝王 拓跋若), fifth son
- Furen, of the Yue clan (夫人 悅氏)
  - Tuoba Meng, Prince Kuang of Anfeng (安豐匡王 拓跋猛; d. 489), sixth son
- Furen, of the Xuan clan (夫人 玄氏)
  - Tuoba Anping, Prince Ai of Han (韓哀王 拓跋安平), seventh son
- Unknown
  - Princess Xihe (西河公主)
    - Married Xue Chuguba of Hedong, Duke Hedong (河東 薛初古拔; 427–484) in 469, and had issue (one son)

== In popular culture ==
- Portrayed by Li Guangjie in the 2006 Chinese TV series Empress Feng of the Northern Wei Dynasty.
- Portrayed by Luo Jin in the 2016 Chinese TV series The Princess Weiyoung.

Regnal titles
Preceded by Tuoba Yu	Emperor of Northern Wei; 452–465	Succeeded by Emperor Xianwen of Northern Wei
