= Mongolian literature =

19th century Mongolian sutra manuscript

Mongolian literature is literature written in Mongolia and/or in the Mongolian language. It was greatly influenced by and evolved from its nomadic oral storytelling traditions, and it originated in the 13th century. The "three peaks" of Mongol literature, The Secret History of the Mongols, Epic of King Gesar and Epic of Jangar, all reflect the age-long tradition of heroic epics on the Eurasian Steppe. Mongol literature has also been a reflection of the society of the given time, its level of political, economic and social development as well as leading intellectual trends.

== Ancient States Era (530 BCE – 1204 CE) ==
The ancestors of the Mongolic peoples are the Bronze-Iron Age Donghu (630 BC-209 BC) mentioned in the Records of the Grand Historian of Sima Qian as bordering north of Yan. Their culture was basically nomadic and thus could have included the regular singing of heroic epics to the accompaniment of early forms of xiqin and dombra. This could have been part of a larger oral tradition that included myths, wisdom sayings and üliger not much different from present Mongol examples. The Xianbei (209 BCE-4th century CE), descendants of the Donghu, were said to have had a runic-like script for writing on strips of wood. A 3rd century CE Xianbei song called the Song of the Xianbei Brother has been preserved in Chinese translation. Many Mongolic words from the Tuoba era (386-534) have come down to us in Chinese transcription, such as huolan (many), wulian (cloud), ezhen (owner), akan (brother), shilou (mountain), china (wolf), kuopuochen (to hedge), tuopuochen (sole of foot) and tawusun (dust). However, these are all fragmentary and no substantial written materials from the Tuobo have been discovered yet that would deserve the name "literature".

The Khitan of the Liao (907-1125) had two scripts, the large and small scripts, invented in the 920s. Compared to the other Xianbei Mongolic peoples they have left a relatively more substantial amount of written material, including lengthy inscriptions found on rocks and in tombs, that are currently being deciphered and researched. It is thought that the Old Uyghur alphabet, derived from the Syriac alphabet, was still used by Nestorians and Buddhists within the major tribes of Mongolia until the time of Genghis Khan although no work has survived.

Among the earliest preserved texts in Mongolic are the Inscription of Hüis Tolgoi and possibly the Bugut inscription. The latter was discovered in the Ikh-Tamir sum of Arkhangai Province, Mongolia. Dated to 584 CE, it is a multi-lingual inscription, with inscriptions in Sogdian (a lingua franca at the time) written in the Sogdian alphabet on the front, right, and left sides, and an inscription likely written in Rouran in the Brahimi script on the back side. The Inscription of Hüis Tolgoi is a monolingual inscription in a Mongolic language. Dated to between the 5th and 7th centuries, the Mongolic language used is much closer to "mainstream Mongolic languages," like Middle Mongolian and the extant Mongolic languages, than to the more southern Khitan language. It might have Buddhist overtones, and the author, patron and subject are unknown.

== Imperial Era (1204–1368) ==
This period starts with the adoption in 1204 of the Uyghur-based Mongolian script as the official script of Genghis Khan's emerging Mongol Empire. The Mongol works that survive from this period reflect the prosperity and diversity of the global empire linked together by an efficient communications system. Yet they represent only a fraction of what would have existed then, since the majority of the works from this period has either not been found or has been destroyed amid the convulsions following the fall of the empire. Examples of lost works include the "Altan Debter", "Ikh Tovchoo" and "Great Yassa".

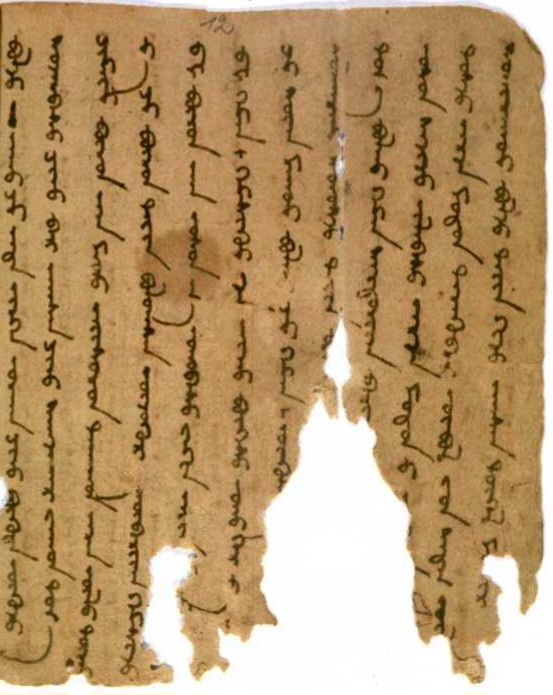
A fragment of a 14th-century Mongolian manuscript of the Alexander Romance, produced in the Chagatai Khanate.

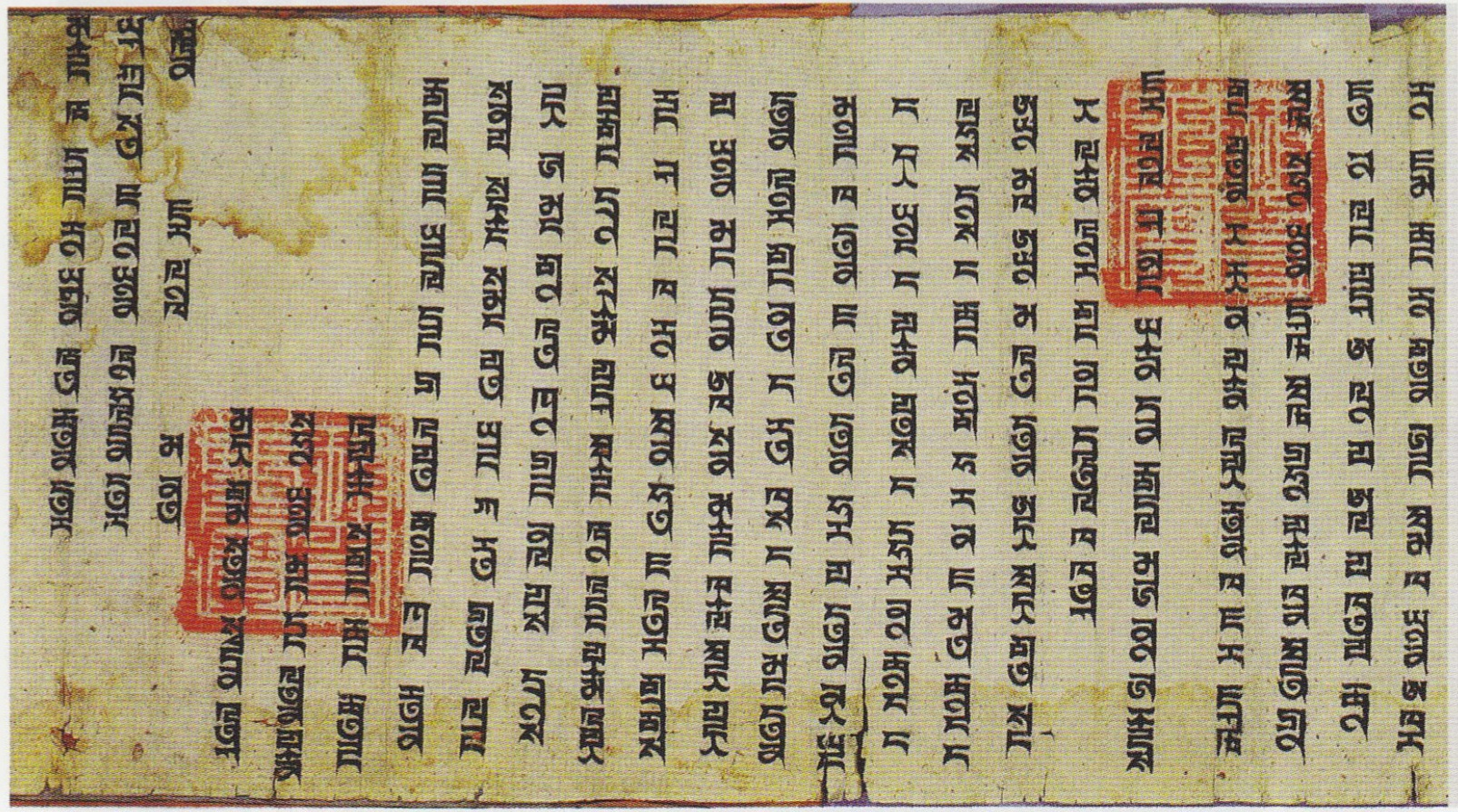
A 1362 Mongolian jarlig of Toghon Temür, the last emperor of the Yuan dynasty, written in the ʼPhags-pa script.

Significant works and writings in Mongol language from this period include:

- The Stele of Yisüngge (~1225–70).
- The Secret History of the Mongols (1228).
- A decree of Ögedei Khan (1240).
- Parchment writings of the Golden Horde (1240s).
- Text of Güyük Khan's Seal marked on a letter to the Pope (1246).
- The stele of Möngke Khan (1257).
- Franco-Mongol letters from Arghun to Philip IV of France (1289) and Pope Nicholas IV (1290) and from Oljaitu to Philip IV (1305)
- The Praise of Mahakala (1305).
- A commentary on the Bodhicaryavatara by Choiji-Odser (1312).
- The Banzragch sutra (early 14th century), Subashid sutra (1290s).
- Poem of Muhammad al-Samarqandi (1290s).
- Alexander Romance (13th to early 14th century).
- Achlalt Nom or Classic of Filial Piety (1307).
- New Testament and Psalms translated by Giovanni da Montecorvino (1310s, now lost).
- The Golden Light Sutra in Mongolian (1330s).
- A book on sacrifice to the Big Dipper (1330s).
- Buddhist dedicatory inscription at Tsavchaal Boomt (1345).
- The edicts of the Yuan Emperors from Kublai Khan to Toghontemur (1279–1368).
- Stone inscriptions at Karakorum (early 14th century).
- Writings unearthed at Turfan (early 14th century).
- Square script inscriptions (1279–1368).

The legal writings of Mongolia in the form of edicts, decrees, and laws are generally written in a special type of formulaic language. They might be termed legal literature.

The Secret History of the Mongols, originally written in the Mongol script, is considered the foundational classic of Mongol literature. In addition to its prose sections, the Secret History contains many sections of poetry. "The Wisdom of Genghis", "The Defeat of the 300 Taijuud by Genghis Khan" and "The Wise Debate of the Orphan Boy with the Nine Generals of Genghis" are considered works of the 14th century that were later copied into historical chronicles of the 17th century.

The Parchment writings of the Golden Horde contain poems expressing the longings of a mother and her far-away son (a soldier) for each other. It is a unique remnant of literature of the common people.

In the early 14th century, a Mongol prince of Yunnan completed an intimate confession and a document regarding his donation to the Buddhists. Around this time, the Confucian Xiaojing ("Classic of Filial Piety") was translated from Chinese into Mongolian and printed.

Translation work was most productive during the Yuan dynasty. Sonom Gara translated Sa-skya Pandita's Legs-bshad, changing the sentence pattern and modifying the text to his own views. Choiji Odser produced many excellent translations and commentaries in Mongol of various major Buddhist sutras including the Bodhicaryavatar, the Banzragch sutra and the Twelve Deeds of the Buddha. He also composed poetry like the Praise of Mahakala as well as the work on Mongol grammar called Zurkhen tolit. Odser's work was continued by his disciple Shirab Sengge, who also carried out other fundamental translations. Among the works translated by Sharavsenge are the Subashid and the Altangerel sutra. As mentioned, the Classic of Filial Piety (Xiao Jing) was translated as well as the New Testament and Psalms.

The short four-line Poem of Muhammad al-Samarqandi about wisdom ("Bilig nigen dalai buyu, Gokhar tendeche gharayu, Bilig-un yoson-i, Bilig-tu kumun medeyu") and the Mongol fragments of the Alexander Romance are reflective of Mongol contact with the Muslim West. In the mid-13th century a Persian scholar called Iftikhar-eddin Muhammed translated the stories of Kalila and Dimna (of the Panchatantra) from Persian into Mongol.

== Dark Ages (1368–1576) ==
After the fall of the Yuan dynasty the punitive expeditions of the Ming put a definitive end to the imperial era in Mongolia, which entered into a Dark Age lasting two centuries until the "Third Introduction of Buddhism" in 1576. No significant Mongol work survives from this period, as of present. It is however known that the Mongol script was still taught to children in gers and that some of the Mongol manuscripts found at Olon-sume date back to this period. During this period the relatively advanced political, economic and social structures of the Mongol Empire had collapsed. Karakorum was razed to the ground in 1380 and Mongolia was reduced to a state not much different, if not worse, than that of the 12th century when it was a nomadic version of the European Dark Ages. Within Ming territory, however, works in Mongol were printed, including the Huáyí yìyǔ dictionary (1389), the Chinese transcription of The Secret History of the Mongols (1386) and a tantric manual in Chinese, Tibetan, Mongol and Sanskrit (1502).

== Renaissance (1576 – late 18th century) ==
After Dayan Khan (1464-1517?/1543?) restored political unity and reestablished the Genghisid line as supreme in Mongolia, the Third (and more thorough) Introduction of Buddhism beginning in 1576 led to further consolidation of unity among the formerly shamanic Mongol tribes. This, and the weakening of the Ming in the late 16th century, allowed the Mongols to enter a period of cultural Renaissance wherein numerous works of literature of many genres were created, including numerous fictional, historical, linguistic, legal and medical works. Among the surviving chronicles are Lubsangdandzin's Altan Tobchi and the works of Saghang Sechen, a writer and Mongolian prince, best known for his Erdeniin Tobchi. Other important works from the period include the anonymous allegory Ere koyar jagal ("The Two Dappled Steeds"), treating freedom and morality, and Shar Tuuj (Sir-a tuguji, "Yellow Story"), written in praise of Dayan Khan in the 17th century.

In the 17th century the Oirat man of letters Zaya Pandita (1599–1662) created the Clear Script. A long afterward to a 1644 translation of Maṇi bka'-'bum by Zaya shows his poetic talent. His disciple Ratnabhadra wrote an important biography of him.

The Mongolian Renaissance continued under the Qing dynasty (1691-1911) and the rule of Bogd Khan (1911-1921). Despite the vast Communist persecutions of the 1930s with the destruction of most monasteries, a great many of these works have survived. The literary Mongolian language that developed during this period is today called Classical Mongol language, while that of the Imperial era and Dark Ages is called pre-Classical Mongol language.

The Kanjur and Tanjur, the translation of which started in the Imperial era, were completed in the Renaissance era. A complete Mongol collection called the Golden Kanjur (1628-1629) was published during the reign of Ligdan Khan in 113 volumes. Later, this version was edited and reprinted in 1718-1720. The Tanjur was finally completed in 1741–1749 and printed in 225 volumes. The oldest written version of the immense epic Geser, the Mongol version decreed by the Kangxi Emperor, was printed in Beijing in 1716. This work inspired the twenty-thousand-verse epic Abai Geser Khübüün of the Buryat people and the Jangar, the epic of the Kalmyks, dating to the 16th century. The Story of Endurel Khan was published in 1666 and is a prominent work of fiction. Tsogt Taiji composed his popular poem in 1621 which was later written on a rock surface in 1624. This poem, which still exists, contains reflections about the basic unity in nature and human love. During the Qing dynasty, Rashipungsug wrote the history Bolor erike ("Crystal Rosary"), completed in 1774.

== Post-Renaissance (late 18th century – 1921) ==
In the 19th century, there was a trend of critical thinking with Injanashi and Danzanravjaa satirizing the worldly pursuits of the Buddhist clergy as well as the excesses of the nobility. Injanashi was the son of Wangchingbala (1795 – 1847), a Mongolian official, writer and historian. He was the author of Köke sudur ("The Blue Chronicle", or "Blue Book of the Yuan Empire"), which was completed by Injanashi after his father's death.

Important novels in Chinese literature were translated into Mongolian, widely read, and influenced the work of Chinese-Mongol authors like Injanashi. The originals included Dream of the Red Chamber, Jin Ping Mei, Journey to the West, and Romance of the Three Kingdoms. Prince Tokhtokhtor produced a book on practical advice concerning management of the traditional economy. Jimbadorji produced the Bolor Toli, an encyclopaedia concerning detailed geographical information and observations about different countries, in 1833.

== Revolutionary literature and socialist realism (1921–1989) ==
In 1921 the establishment of the Provisional Government of Sükhbaatar led to a radical change in Mongol society as the country abruptly entered the modern, industrial world. The close alignment with the Soviet Union meant that socialist realism would be the dominant literary style for the following decades. Important pioneers of modern Mongol literature were D. Natsagdorj (1906-1937), S. Buyannemekh, and Ts. Damdinsüren. Successful writers from the post-war period include S. Erdene, Ch. Lodoidamba, and S. Udval. Literary topics were often taken from countryside life, from the times of Mongolia's struggle for independence and the communist revolution, or from the Second World War. Many of B. Rinchen's works deal with Mongolia's older history. One of the most popular poets of the time was dissident poet R.Choinom who served a sentence for his works.

== Liberal literature (since 1989) ==
The perestroika period and democratic processes of the late 1980s stimulated Mongol writers to seek new forms of expression breaking the constraints of socialist realism. Distinctive representatives of the post-Soviet epoch were B. Lhagvasuren, G. Badamsambu, B. Galsansukh, Ochirbatyn Dashbalbar, D. Urianhai, Sh. Gurbazar, Galsan Tschinag, Ts. Khulan and others.

== Sample ==
This is an excerpt from Kh.Chilaajav's poem Aavdaa bi hairtai (I love my father) written in Sep 1990. It was adapted to a 1999 song of the same name by the rock band Hurd. The form and meter of this poem is typically Mongolian.

Mongolian: Намрын бороо зөөлөн шиврэхэд аав минь дуртай Насыг нь зөөж буцсаар л байгаа шувуудад хайртай Өөрөө өтлөвч, орчлонд үлдэнэ гэж надад хайртай Өдрөөс өдөрт холдсоор л байгаа аавдаа би хайртай Шар наран улам алслаад л Саяхан ногоон байсан өвс навч гандаад л Алсын зам аавын харц шиг сүүмийгээд л Аяа намар цаг надаас нэгийг нэхээ юү? Нэг л намар миний адил залуу явсан аав минь Эгэл хоногуудын эргэлтэд элэгдэж өтөлжээ Эргэж тойрсон хорвоогийн шаргал намрууд Эцгийн минь магнайг зуран зуран оджээ	English translation: My father likes the soft drizzle of autumn rain He loves the going birds carrying away his years He ages but loves me since I'll stay in this world I love my father who distances every day The yellow sun above keeps moving far away The grass that now was green has suddenly dried up The distant road is dim just like my father's gaze Alas, do you seek something from me, autumn time? My father who one autumn was as young as me Through turn of days mundane has been worn down and aged The yellow autumns that revolve around the world With each departure left lines on my father's head
