= Bayandelger =

Bayandelger is the name of two sums (districts) in Mongolia:

- Bayandelger, Sükhbaatar
- Bayandelger, Töv
