= Rouran language =

Unclassified extinct language of the Rouran

Rouran
- Ruanruan, Ruan-ruan, Juan-juan
- Native to: Rouran Khaganate
- Region: Mongolia and northern China
- Era: 4th century AD – 6th century AD
- Language family: Unclassified (Para-) Mongolic?

Language codes
- ISO 639-3: None (mis)
- Glottolog: None

Rouran (Chinese: 柔然), also called Ruanruan, Ruan-ruan or Juan-juan (Chinese: 蠕蠕), is an unclassified extinct language of Mongolia and Inner Mongolia, spoken in the Rouran Khaganate from the 4th to the 6th centuries AD. The Rouran state was undoubtedly multi-ethnic, but there is no definite evidence as to their language. The received view is that the relationships of the language remain a puzzle.

== Classification ==
Peter A. Boodberg claimed in 1935 that the Rouran language was Mongolic by analysing Chinese transcriptions of Rouran names. Atwood (2013) notes that Rourans calqued the Sogdian word pūr "son" into their language as *kʻobun (Chinese transliteration: 去汾 MC *kʰɨʌ^{H}-bɨun > Mandarin qùfén); which, according to Atwood, is cognate with Middle Mongol kö'ün "son". In 2004, linguist Alexander Vovin noted that Old Turkic had borrowed some words from an unknown language not part of the Altaic sprachbund that might have been Rouran, arguing that if so, the language would be possibly a language isolate, though evidence was scant. In 2019, with the emergence of new evidence through the analysis of the Brāhmī Bugut and Khüis Tolgoi stone inscriptions, Vovin changed his view, suggesting Rouran was, in fact, a Mongolic language, close but not identical to Middle Mongolian.

According to Alexander Savelyev and Choongwon Jeong, the identification of these inscriptions with the Rouran language remains problematic because of the dating. According to Vovin, the Brāhmī Bugut inscription is dated to ca. 584–587 AD, and the Khüis Tolgoi inscription must have been erected between 604 and 620 AD. As both were created several decades after the Rouran Khaganate had been destroyed, Savelyev and Jeong conclude that it is unsafe to make conclusions on the composition of the Rouran population, or its elite, on the basis of these inscriptions.

== Phonology ==
Features of Rouran included:

- no mid vowels
- presence of initial l-
- final consonantal cluster -nd unusual for any "Altaic" languages

== Morphology ==
Rouran had the feminine gender suffix -tu-.

== Lexicon ==
Rouran vocabulary included:

- and – 'oath' < Old Turkic: 𐰦, romanized: ant 'oath'
- aq – 'dung', 'white'
- beg – 'elder' < Old Turkic: 𐰋𐰀𐰘
- bitig – 'inscription' < Old Turkic: 𐰋𐰃𐱅𐰏, romanized: bitig 'inscription, book'
- bod – 'people' < Old Turkic: 𐰉𐰆𐰑, romanized: bod 'clan, tribe, kin'
- drö – 'law'
- küǰü – 'strength' < Old Turkic: 𐰚𐰇𐰲, romanized: küč 'strength, power'
- küskü – 'rat'
- laɣzïn – 'pig' < Old Turkic: 𐰞𐰍𐰔𐰃𐰤
- luu – 'dragon' < Middle Chinese luŋ – 'dragon'
- ordu – 'camp'
- qaɣan – 'emperor'
- qaɣatun – 'empress'
- qan – 'khan'
- qatun – 'khan's wife'
- tal- – 'to plunder'
- törö – 'to be born'
- türǖg – 'Turk'
- ud – 'ox'
- yund – 'horse' < Old Turkic: 𐰖𐰆𐰣𐱃, romanized: yunt - 'horse'
