= Middle Mongol =

Language spoken in Eurasia during the Mongol Empire and the Post-Mongol Empires

Middle Mongol ᠮᠣᠩᠭᠤᠯ ᠬᠡᠯᠡ Mongɣol khele
- Middle Mongolian
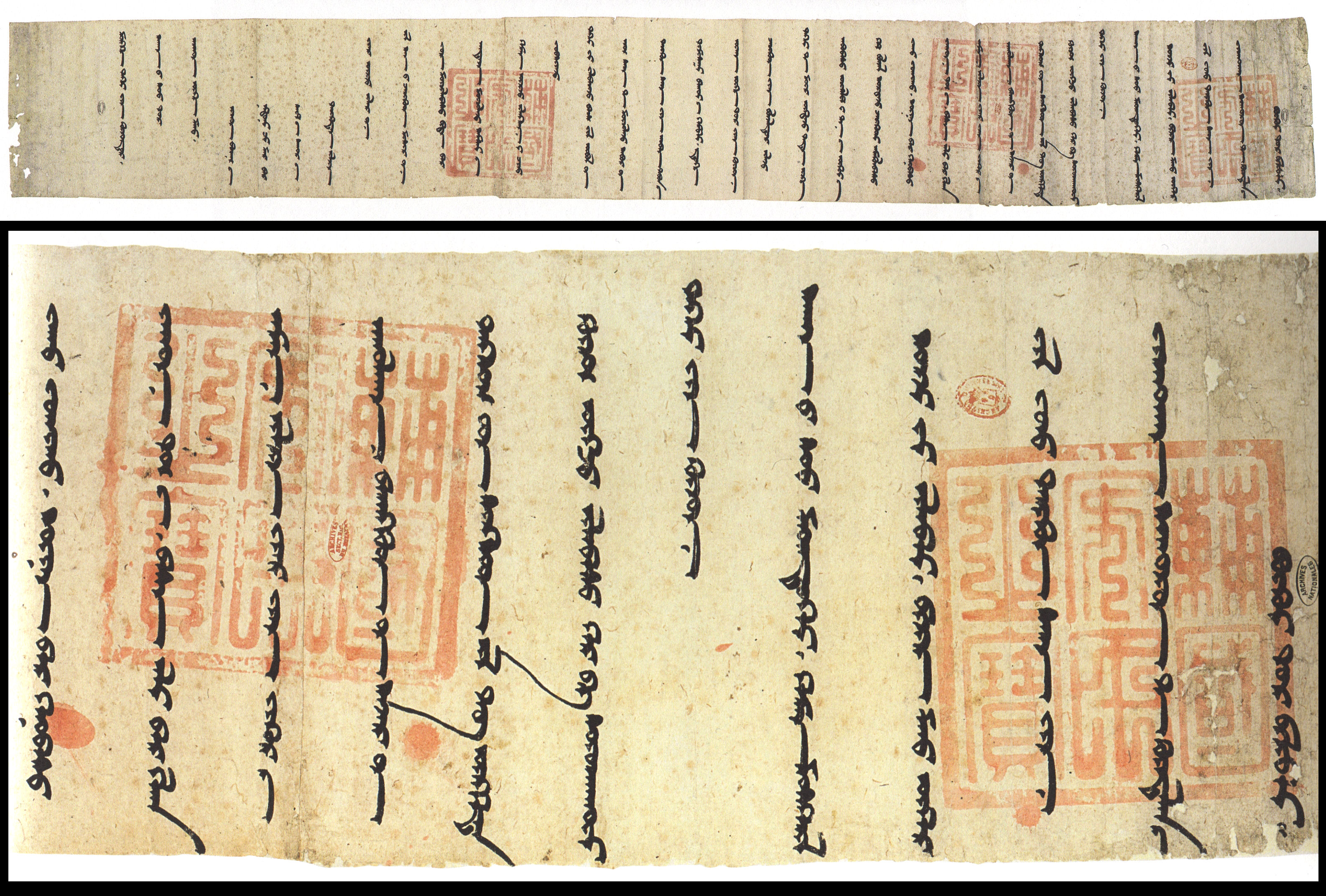
- Letter of Arghun Khan to Philip the Fair, in Middle Mongol language in the Mongolian script, 13th-century
- Native to: Mongolia, China, Russia
- Era: Developed into Classical Mongolian by the 17th century
- Language family: Mongolic: Middle Mongol ᠮᠣᠩᠭᠤᠯ ᠬᠡᠯᠡ Mongɣol khele
- Early form: Proto-Mongolic language
- Writing system: Mongolian script ʼPhags-pa; Chinese characters Arabic alphabet

Language codes
- ISO 639-3: xng
- Glottolog: midd1351

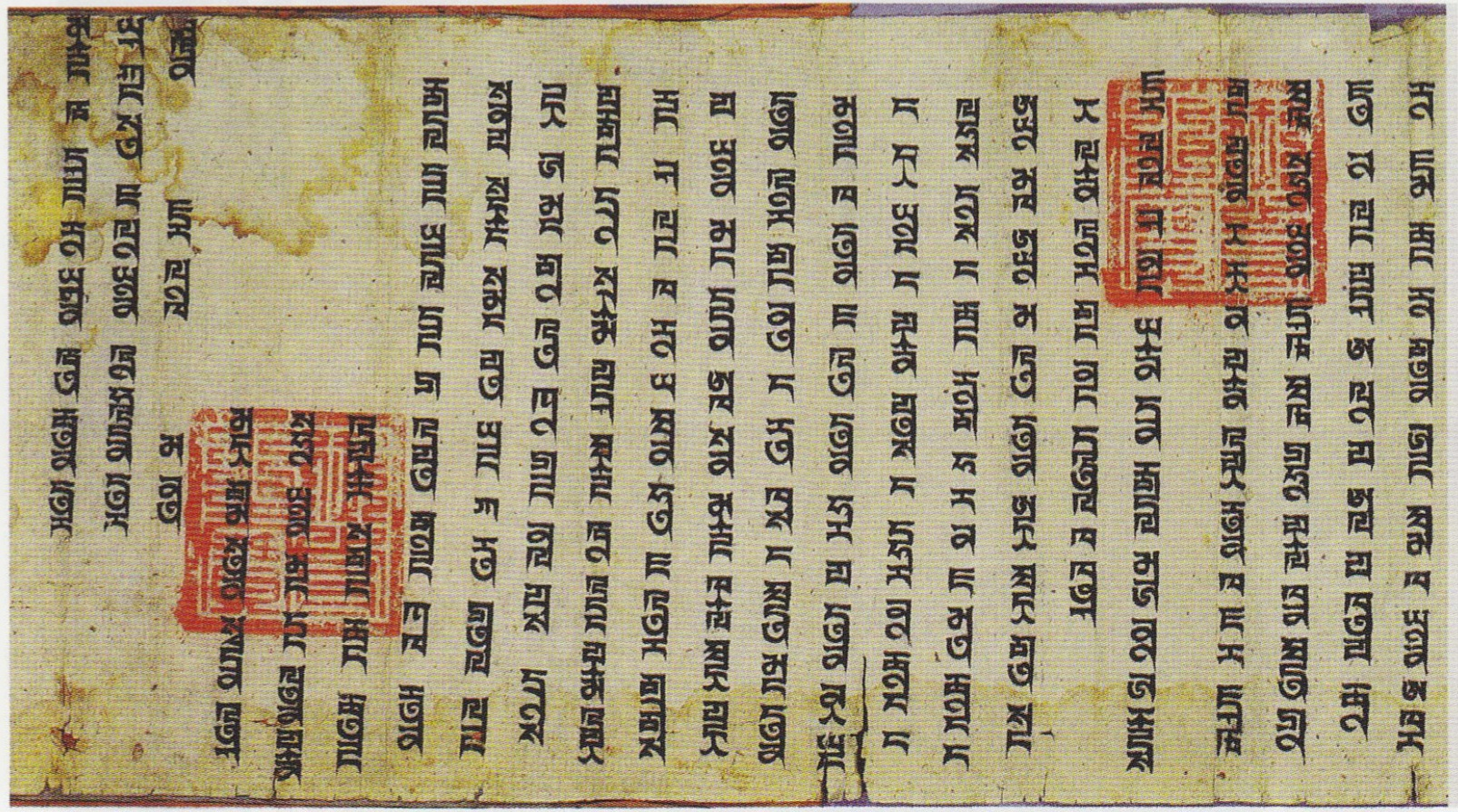
Imperial edict of Toghon Temür Khan, written in Middle Mongol language and the Phagspa script, 14th-century, Mongol Yuan Dynasty

Middle Mongol or Middle Mongolian was a Mongolic koiné language spoken in the Mongol Empire. Originating from Genghis Khan's home region of Northeastern Mongolia, it diversified into several Mongolic languages after the collapse of the empire. In comparison to Modern Mongolian, it is known to have had no long vowels, different vowel harmony and verbal systems and a slightly different case system.

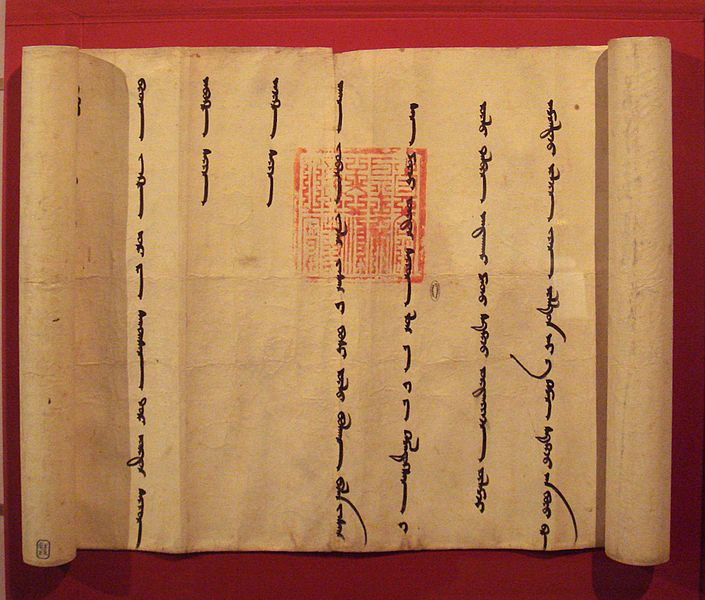
Letter of Öljaitü Khan of the Ilkhanate to Philip IV of France, written in Middle Mongol language

== Definition and historical predecessors ==
Middle Mongol closely resembles Proto-Mongolic, the reconstructed last common ancestor of the modern Mongolic languages, which dates it to shortly after the time when Genghis Khan united a number of tribes under his command and formed the Khamag Mongol.

The term "Middle Mongol" is somewhat misleading, since it is the earliest directly-attested (as opposed to reconstructed) ancestor of Modern Mongolian, and would therefore be termed "Old Mongolian" under the usual conventions for naming historical forms of languages (compare the distinction between Old Chinese and Middle Chinese). Although the existence of an earlier ("old") Mongol clan federation in Mongolia during the 12th century is historically attested, there is no surviving linguistic material from that period.

According to Vovin (2019), the Rouran language of the Rouran Khaganate was a Mongolic language and close, but not identical, to Middle Mongol.

Juha Janhunen (2006) classified the Khitan language into the "Para-Mongolic" family, meaning it is related to the Mongolic languages as a sister group, rather than as a direct descendant of Proto-Mongolic. Alexander Vovin has also identified several possible loanwords from Koreanic languages into Khitan. He also identified the extinct Tuyuhun language as another Para-Mongolic language.

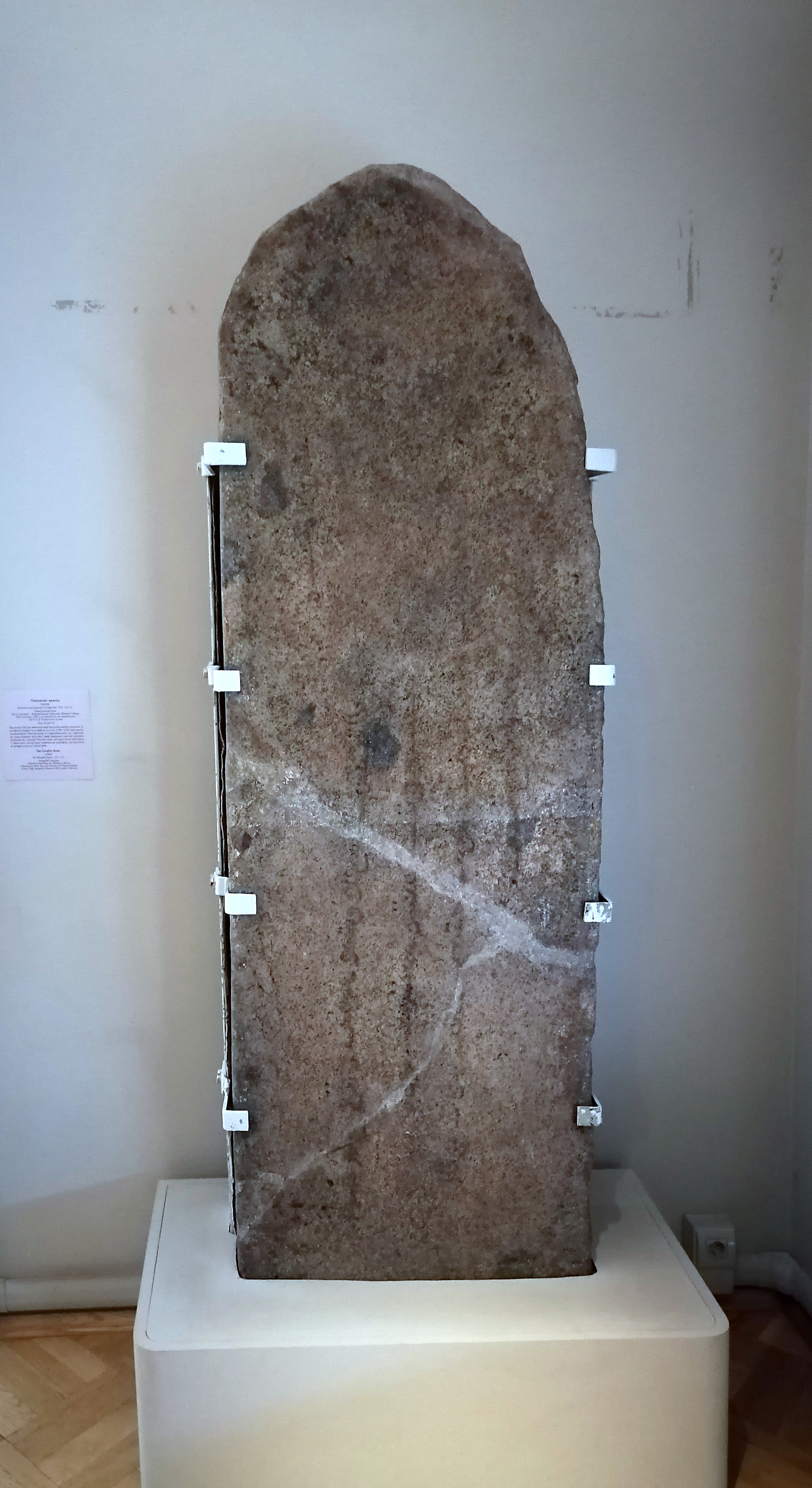
Stele of Genghis Khan, written in Middle Mongol in the Mongolian script, 1224.

== Corpus ==
The temporal delimitation of Middle Mongol causes some problems as shown in definitions ranging from the 13th until the early 15th or until the late 16th century. This discrepancy arises from the lack of documents written in the Mongolian language from between the early 15th and late 16th centuries. It is not clear whether these two delimitations constitute conscious decisions about the classification of e.g. a small text from 1453 with less than 120 words or whether the wider definition is just intended to fill up the time gap for which little proper evidence is available.

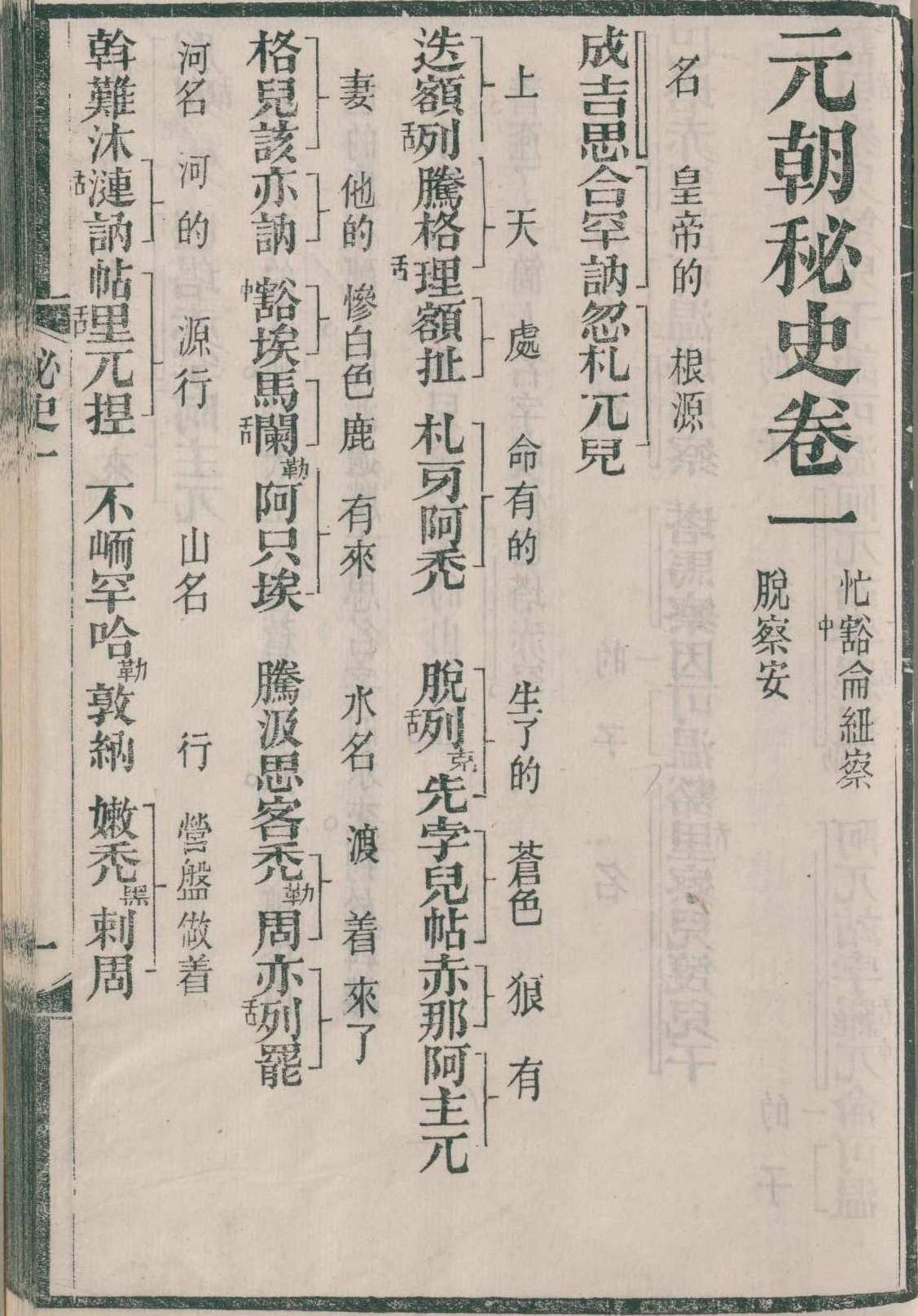
Initial pages of the Secret History of the Mongols published in 1908 by Ye Dehui. The rows with large characters represent Mongolian phonetic transcription in Chinese characters, with the right-hand smaller characters representing the glosses

Yuan era paiza with Middle Mongol inscriptions in Phags-pa script

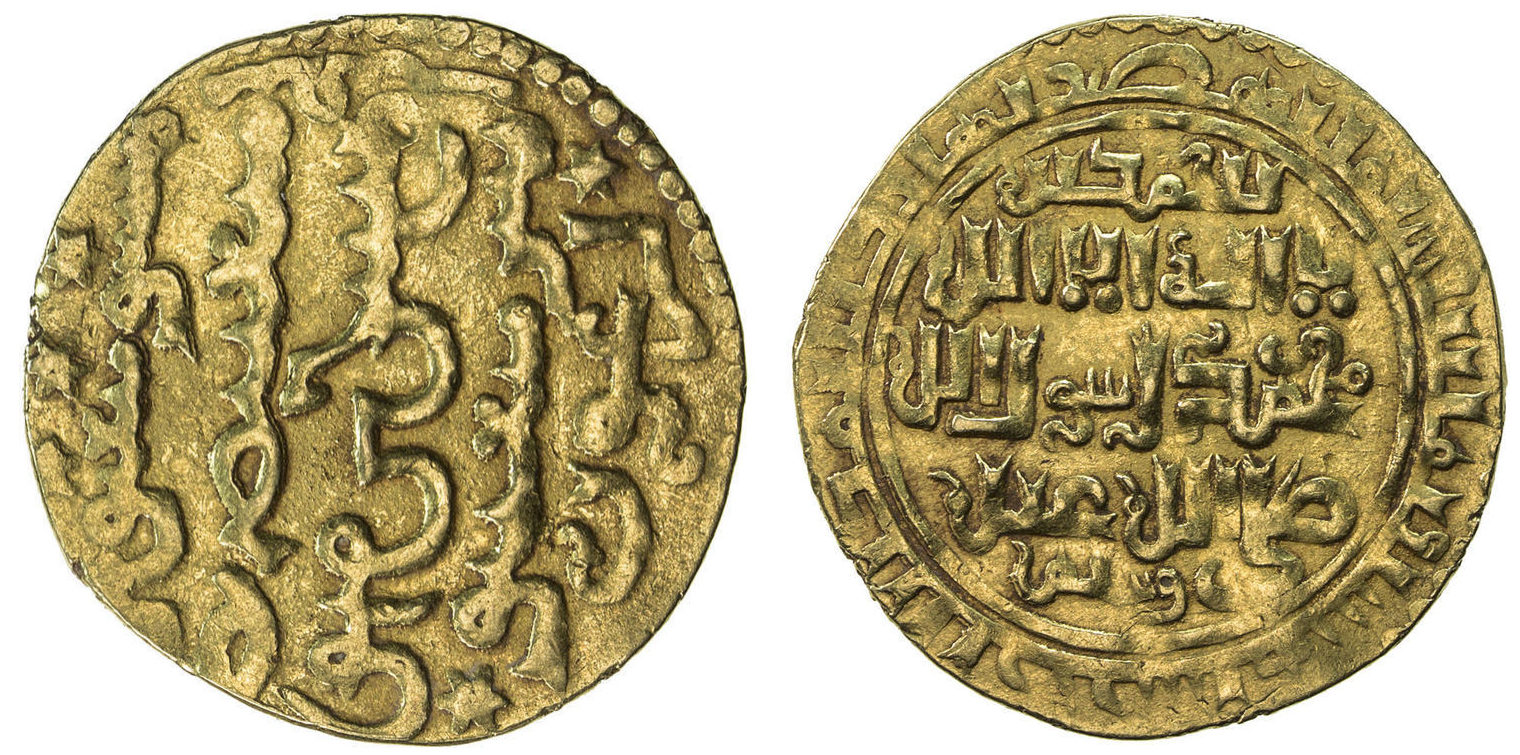
Gold dinar of the Arghun Il Khan of Mongol Ilkhanate in Persia, with Middle Mongol legends in Mongolian script

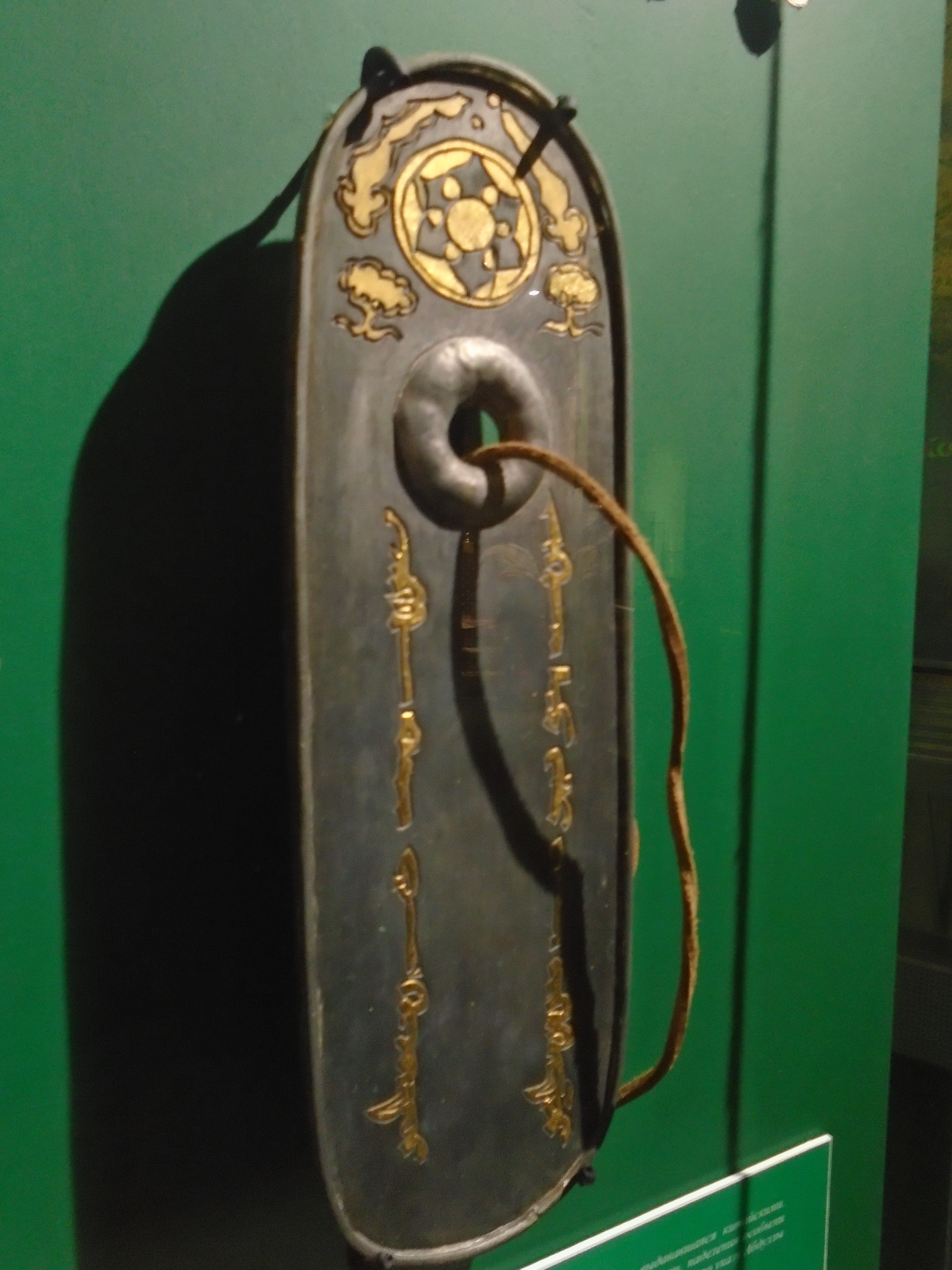
Paiza of Abdullah Khan (Golden Horde), written in Middle Mongolian language in the Mongolian script, 14th-century

Middle Mongol survived in a number of scripts, namely notably ʼPhags-pa (decrees during the Yuan dynasty), Arabic (dictionaries), Chinese, Mongolian script and a few western scripts. Usually, the Stele of Yisüngge is considered to be its first surviving monument. It is a sports report written in Mongolian writing that was already fairly conventionalized then and most often dated between 1224 and 1225. However, Igor de Rachewiltz argues that it is unlikely that the stele was erected at the place where it was found in the year of the event it describes, suggesting that it is more likely to have been erected about a quarter of a century later, when Yisüngge had gained more substantial political power. If so, the earliest surviving Mongolian monument would be an edict of Töregene Khatun of 1240 and the oldest surviving text arguably The Secret History of the Mongols, a document that must originally have been written in Mongolian script in 1252, but which survives only in an edited version as a textbook for learning Mongolian from the Ming dynasty, thus reflecting the pronunciation of Middle Mongol from the second half of the 14th century.

The term "Middle Mongol" is problematic insofar as there is no body of texts that is commonly called "Old Mongol". While a revision of this terminology for the early period of Mongolian has been attempted, the lack of a thorough and linguistically-based periodization of Mongolian up to now has constituted a problem for any such attempts. The related term "Preclassical Mongolian" is applied to Middle Mongol documents in Mongolian script, since these show some distinct linguistic peculiarities.

== Phonology ==
Middle Mongol had the consonant phonemes /p, m, tʰ, t, s, n, l, r, t͡ʃʰ, t͡ʃ, j, kʰ, k, h/ and the vowel phonemes /i, e, y, ø, a, u, o/. The main difference to older approaches is that ⟨γ⟩ is identified with /h/ and /ɡ/ (sometimes as [p] before /u/ and /y/), so that *pʰ for Proto-Mongolic cannot be reconstructed from internal evidence that used to be based solely on word-initial /h/ and the then rather incomplete data from Monguor.

Vowels
	Front	Neutral	Back
High	y	i	u
Mid	ø		o
Low	e		a

Consonants
	Labial	Alveolar	Palatal	Velar	Uvular
Nasal	m	n		ŋ	
Fortis	p	t	t͡ʃ	k	
Lenis	b	d	d͡ʒ	ɡ	(ɢ)?
Fricative		s	ʃ		h
Lateral		l			
Liquid		r			
Semivowel	w		j		

There appears to have been a positionally determined allophonic variation [k]~[q], [ɡ]~[ɢ], with the postvelar allophones occurring in back-vowel contexts. Both have been claimed to occur before /i/ (depending on its origin from Proto-Mongolic */i/ or */ɯ/), which would make them phonemic.

In transliteration, /ø/ and /y/ are commonly indicated as ⟨ö⟩ and ⟨ü⟩, respectively; /t͡ʃ/, /d͡ʒ/ and /ʃ/ are written ⟨c⟩ (or ⟨č⟩), ⟨j⟩ and ⟨sh⟩ (or ⟨š⟩); /j/ is denoted by ⟨y⟩; /ŋ/ is spelt ⟨ng⟩; and /ɢ/ may be expressed by ⟨gh⟩ (or ⟨γ⟩).

== Morphophonology ==
The vowels participate in front-back vowel harmony, where /a/, /o/ and /u/ alternate with /e/, /ø/ and /y/; in the rest of this article, morphemes are represented only by their back-vocalic allomorph. The vowel /i/ is neutral with respect to vowel harmony. Certain stems end in an 'unstable /n/' (here marked n), which is obligatorily or optionally dropped in front of various suffixes. The consonants /g/ and /k/ are in alternation with a hiatus in front of certain vowel-initial suffixes.

== Grammar ==
Middle Mongol is an agglutinating language that makes nearly exclusive use of suffixes. The word order is subject–object–predicate if the subject is a noun and also object–predicate–subject if it is a pronoun. Middle Mongol rather freely allows for predicate–object, which is due to language contact. There are nine cases, the nominative being unmarked. The verbal suffixes can be divided into finite suffixes, participles and converbal suffixes. Some of the finite suffixes inflect for subject number and gender. Adjectives precede their modificatum and agree with it in number. The pronouns have a clusivity distinction.

=== Nominal morphology ===
==== Number ====
The plural suffixes are distributed as follows:

Suffix	Used with	Note
-nar	vowel stems denoting non-lineal kinship terms and deities	only in texts of eastern provenance
-nu'ud	unclear	only in texts of eastern provenance
-s	vowel stems	
-d	stems in -n, -l, -r	The stem-final consonant is elided; likewise the entire stem-final sequence -sun in earlier texts.
-ud	other consonant stems (and occasionally stems in -n, -l, -r as well)	
-n	stems in a vowel + -y	The stem-final -y is elided.

==== Case endings and the reflexive suffix ====
The case endings have different allomorphs depending on whether the stem ends in a vowel, the consonant /n/ or another consonant. There is also some chronological variation between earlier and later texts, as marked with the sign > in the table.

	vowel stems	consonant stems	n-stems
genitive	-yin, -n	-un, -in, -ai	-(n)u('ai)
accusative	-yi	-i	-(n)i
dative-locative	-Du(r), -Da	-a	-(n)a
ablative	-('a)ca > -('a)sa	-('a)ca > -('a)sa	-(n)(a)ca > -asa
instrumental	-'ar (-bar)	-i'ar > -aar	-(n)i'ar
comitative	-lu'a > -laa		

The dative-locative may denote not only an indirect object, but also local and temporal expressions, both static and dynamic. The accusative ending may be replaced by the unmarked nominative, especially if the noun is not definite and specific; in such cases, stems ending in unstable /n/ lose it. The comitative may also be used as an instrumental. The ablative expresses the object of a comparison in a construction expressing the comparative degree: qola-ca qola 'farther than far', lit. 'far from far'. The genitive does the same in the superlative degree construction: irgen-ü sayin haran 'the best of the people', lit. 'people good of people'.

A reflexive possessive suffix (meaning 'his own', 'my own' and so on) can be placed after a noun declined for any case. Its shape varies depending on phonological factors and the genitive ending of vowel stems is also changed in front of it:

	after vowels	after consonants
basic form	-'an (-ban)	-i'an
genitive	-yu-'an > -yaan	-u-'an > -aan

==== Pronouns ====
The personal pronouns exhibit an inclusive-exclusive distinction. They mostly take the same case suffixes as the nouns, but display some suppletion and stem allomorphy, as summarised below:

Personal pronouns
			NOM	GEN	ACC & COM	DAT	ABL & INSTR
1st person	singular		bi	min-	nama-	na(ma)-	nada-
1st person	plural	exclusive	ba	man-			
1st person	plural	inclusive	bida	bidan-			
2nd person	singular		ci	cin-	cima-		
2nd person	plural		ta	tan-			
3rd person	singular		(ene, tere, mün)	in-	ima-		
3rd person	plural		(ede, tede, müt)	an-			

Other pronouns and related forms are:

	nom.sg.	oblique	plural	plural oblique	place	manner	kind	quantity	time
proximal demonstrative	ene	e'ün-	ede(-er/ci)	eden-	ende	eyin	eyimü (pl.-n)	edüi	
distal demonstrative	tere	teün-	tede	teden-	tende	teyin	teyimü (pl.-n)	tedüi	
'same'	mün	mün	müt						
interrogative who?	ken	ken-	ked			ker		kedüi	keji'e, keli
interrogative what?	ya'un > yaan	ya'un > yaan	ya'ud		qa'a	yekin	yambar		
reflexive	ö'er (öber)	ö'er-	ö'ed						

Indefinite pronouns are formed by combining the interrogatives and the particle -ba(r).

=== Verbal morphology ===
==== Finite indicative verb forms ====
The finite indicative verbal suffixes express different shades of temporal, aspectual and modal meaning, and the ones with a past meaning also agree with the subject in semantic/biological gender. There are two present and two past forms, with a modal distinction between a marked and unmarked form within each pair, and a pluperfect. The usual suffixes are displayed in the table below. As above, more innovative variants are introduced with the sign >.

Temporal meaning:	Name of the form:		Suffix	Meaning and use
present	narrative		‑m(u(i))	The usual present-future tense.
present	deductive		-yu (-yi)	Described either as a present inferential mood form (used to state something that can be deduced from available evidence) or as expressing certainty ('of course', 'obviously').
past	terminative	masculine	-ba	The usual perfective past tense. According to some, however, a near past perfective tense, expressing the notion of 'having just done' something).
past	terminative	feminine	-bi	The usual perfective past tense. According to some, however, a near past perfective tense, expressing the notion of 'having just done' something).
past	terminative	ambivalent	-bai	The usual perfective past tense. According to some, however, a near past perfective tense, expressing the notion of 'having just done' something).
past	confirmative	masculine	-lu'a > ‑la'a	Stresses the fact that a past action or state has been witnessed or is otherwise known beyond any doubt.
past	confirmative	feminine	-li'i	Stresses the fact that a past action or state has been witnessed or is otherwise known beyond any doubt.
past	confirmative	ambivalent	-lu'ai > ‑la'ai	Stresses the fact that a past action or state has been witnessed or is otherwise known beyond any doubt.
pluperfect	resultative	masculine	-Ju'u	The pluperfect (past perfect) tense.
pluperfect	resultative	feminine	-Ji'i, -Ji'ai	The pluperfect (past perfect) tense.
pluperfect	resultative	ambivalent	-Ju'ui > ‑Ja'ai	The pluperfect (past perfect) tense.

In addition, a durative suffix -nam is attested only in late Arabic sources (originally the converbal suffix -n, on which see below, combined with the copula a- in the narrative form). There are also some attestations of the finite use of a form in -d with plural subjects, whose singular may have been, again, a form in -n.

==== Deontic forms ====
There are a number of forms expressing wishes and commands, as shown in the following table.

Name of the form	suffix	meaning and use
optative	-su('ai)	1st person singular, sometimes plural ('I or we want to do X')
desiderative	-'asa	Same as above, but more innovative and found only in Arabic sources.
imperative	-∅	2nd person singular ('Do X!')
concessive	-Dukai	3rd person, rarely 2nd person ('He shall do X.', 'Let him do X!')
voluntative	-ya	1st person plural ('Let us do X!')
benedictive	-Dkun (-gtun)	2nd person plural, polite ('Please do X!')
dubitative	-'uja('a)i	A negative wish or concern referring to a possible action by the first or second person ('Let him not do X!', 'You/he should not do X', 'But suppose he does X!').

A polite request can also be expressed by a future passive participle form -qda-qu (see below).

==== Participles ====
There are a number of participles. They may be used attributively or as standalone heads of nominal phrases, and several may also be combined with a copula to form complex verbal forms, or simply be used predicatively without a copula. They are listed in the following table.

		Suffix	Notes
future	singular	-ku(i)	May also be used predicatively as a future tense. Also used as a general action noun (infinitive).
future	plural	-kun	May also be used predicatively as a future tense. Also used as a general action noun (infinitive).
imperfective		-'a(i)	Rarely used predicatively with a meaning 'has done X'.
perfective	singular	-gsan	May also be used predicatively as a past tense.
perfective	plural	-gsad	May also be used predicatively as a past tense.
habitual		-dag	
agentive	singular	-gci	
agentive	plural	-gcin, ‑gcid	

==== Converbs ====
Converbs are used as modifiers of the finite verb and their subject is normally the same as that of the finite verb. The following types occur:

	suffix	meaning and use
modal	-n	'by doing X'
imperfective	-ju (-ji)	'(while) doing X'
perfective	-'ad	'(after) having done X'
conditional	-'asu (-basu)	'if he does X', 'when he did X' (the subject may be different from that of the finite verb). When combined with the particle -ber, it has concessive function 'even if / although he does X'.
terminative	-tala	'until he does X'. It also sometimes expresses simultaneous action.
final	-ra	'in order to do X'
preparative	-run	'in consequence of doing X'
abtemporal	-gsa-'ar(-gsa-bar)	'as soon as he had done X'

==== Voice ====
The voice morphology can be viewed as part of word formation. The following suffixes may be mentioned:

	after vowels	after consonants	Notes
passive	-gda	-da	
causative	-'a, -'ul	-ka, -ga	
reciprocative	-ldu	-uldu	
cooperative	-lca	-ulca	Meaning 'to do X together'.
middle	-ra	-ura	Expressing an action affecting the subject.

Middle Mongol exhibits a passive construction that is peculiar to it and maybe Buryat as well, but is not present in the other dialects or in the other Mongolic languages. While it might also have fulfilled the function to foreground the patient, it usually seems to mark actions which either affect the subject directly or indirectly affect it in a harmful way.

belgütei teyin čabčiqdaju bö’et
Belgütei so chop-PASS-CVB-IMPERF be-CVB-PRF
‘Belgütei, having been chopped in that manner’

ke’üt minu qat bolju’u ke’ekdemüi bi
son-PL my khan-PL become-PAST say-PASS-PRS I
‘I am told that my sons have become khans’

ma’ui setki’esü ene metü čisuban qarqaqdasu
bad think-CVB-COND this like {blood-one's own} {come out-PASS-voluntative}
‘If I think evil I shall be subject to letting out my blood like this’ or ‘Now if I think evil ..., let my blood be shed like this!’

naimana irge orqoban eme kö’üben da’uliqdaba bi
{Naiman (tribal name)-DAT} people {homestead-one's own} woman {son-one's own} pillage-PAST I
‘I have been spoiled by the Naiman in respect of my people and folk and wives and sons’

In §131, Belgütei is negatively affected by an unknown actor. In §112, the addressee is the passive subject. While it is possible for the speech content to be passive subject, it is far less frequent. In §178, the referent of the subject is directly affected, but syntactically, the affected noun phrase is marked with the reflexive-possessive suffix (that on its own can resemble the accusative case in other contexts). In §163, it is not the referent of the subject noun phrase, but people related to it that are directly affected to the distress of the subject.

The agent may be marked by the dative (-a and -da, but in contrast to Classical Mongolian never -dur) or the nominative:

Ögödei qahan ebetčin gürtejü
Ögödei Khan illness reach-PASS-CVB-IMPERF
‘Ögödei Khan being befallen by an illness’

qalqa kene boldaquyu bi
shield who-DAT become-PASS-PRES I
‘By whom shall the office of shield be done for me?’

In both of these examples, the verb stems to which the passive subject is suffixed are intransitive. Passive suffixes get suffixed to phrases, not verbal stems, e.g.:

Jamuqa nökötte'en bariju irekdejü
Jamuqa {companion-DAT-one's own} seize-CVB-IMPERF come-PASS-CVB-IMPERF
'Jamuqa, being seized by his companions and forced to come (unto Genghis Khan)'

In modern Mongolian, neither the passivization of ir- nor the suffixing of passive suffixes to phrases are possible, so the modern translation of §200 runs:

Jamuha nöhöddöö barigdaž ireed
Jamuha {friend-DAT-one's own} seize-PASS-CVB-IMPERF come-CVB-IMPERF

Next to the passive, there is also a causative that is, however, less notable. Subjects of intransitive verbs of clauses that are causativized get accusative marking (as in §79), while former subjects of transitive verbs get marked with dative or instrumental case (as in §188 and §31). In contrast to the passive suffix, the causative suffix does not attach to a phrase, but to single verbs (as long as they denote different actions):

Temüjin-i morila’ulju
Temüjin-ACC {mount a horse-CAUS-CVB-IMPERF}
'they had Temüjin mount a horse'

mori-yan Kököčü aqtači-da'an bari’ulju’ui
{horse-one's own} Kököčü {keeper of geldings-DAT-one's own} seize-CAUS-PAST
'He gave his horse to his equerry Kököčü to hold'

qarčiqai-bar bari’uluqsan noqut
hawk-INSTR seize-CAUS-PERF-PTCP duck-PL
'the ducks ... caught by his hawk'

berined-iyen berile’üljü ötökle’üljü qu’urda’ulju
{daughter-in-law-one's own} {to daughter-in-law-CVB-IMPERF} present_ötög-c i play_qu'ur-c i
'She had her daughter-in-law perform the rites pertaining to a daughter in law, ordered that the ceremonial wine be drunk and the horse fiddle be played, and ...'
'making the daughters in law perform the rites of a daughter in law, making one to present the ötög, making one to play the qu'ur'

Next to these morphemes, Middle Mongol also had suffixes to express reciprocal and cooperative meaning, namely -ldu- ~ -lda- and -lča-. While the plurative/distributive -čaγa- is common to modern Mongolic languages, it is not attested in Middle Mongol.

=== Particles ===
There are a number of enclitic particles:

Particle	Use
bar, bae, ci	marks a topic (as well as indefinite pronouns and concessive constructions, see above)
gü	emphatic
lu	contrastive
je	potential, 'possibly'
yuu after vowels, uu after consonants	interrogative

There are three preposed negative particles used with verb forms:

particle	negated forms
ese	default
ül(ü), üle	indicative present-tense forms, futuritive participle and modal converb, as well as dubitative
bu(u)	other deontic forms

Identity with nominal parts of speech is negated by means of the word busu (busi), pl. busud, 'other', thus literally 'X is other than Y'.

=== Syntax ===
The usual word order is SOV, but there are deviations. A pronoun of the 1st or 2nd person may be placed as an enclitic after the verb rather than before it. In noun phrases, modifiers are normally placed in front of heads (i.e. adjectives and possessors precede nouns), but possessive pronouns (minu 'my' etc.) are often placed as enclitics after the head instead. Number agreement between attributes and the nouns they modify is observed optionally. There is also gender agreement (for the suffix -tu and some verbal forms), but no case agreement; instead, only the head receives the case marker. There are no conjunctions. Long sequences of converbs preceding the finite verb are common.

== Word formation ==
Some of the common suffixes are the following:

Denominal nouns
-btur	moderative, '-ish'
-ci	person who deals with X
-du	located in X
-kan	diminutive
-ki	belonging to X
-kcin	female animal
-tu, fem. -tai, pl. -tan	having X
Deverbal nouns
-aci	agent noun
-ur	instrument
-dal, -(ku)lang, -l, -m, etc.	action noun
Denominal verbs
-cila	factitive
-ra, -si	inchoative

On the formation of verbs from other verbs, see the Voice section above.

== Numerals ==
The numeral system is decimal. Almost all numerals end in -n, although some are also attested without the final -n. The decimals from 20 to 50 end in -in, while those from 60 to 90 end in -an (as do many of the units); the decimals, apart from 'ten', share the same historical root with the corresponding units, but the exact derivational relation is not regular and transparent. The most common and archaic forms are as follows:

unit	decimal
1: niken	10: harban
2: qoyar (feminine jirin)	20: qorin
3: qurban	30: qucin
4: dörben	40: döcin
5: tabun	50: tabin
6: jirqo'an, jirwa'an	60: jiran
7: dolo'an	70: dalan
8: naiman	80: nayan
9: yisün	90: yeren

There are also simple numerals for one hundred (ja'un), one thousand (minqan/mingan) and ten thousand (tümen).

Both teens and sums of other tens and a unit are formed by juxtaposing the ten and the unit, e.g. 15 harban tabun, lit. 'ten five'; 26 qorin jirqo'an, lit. 'twenty six'. Multiples of hundred, thousand and ten thousand are also expressed by juxtaposition, e.g. 500 tabun ja'un, lit. 'five hundred'; in these cases, the second component may also optionally stand in the plural, e.g. 500 tabun ja'ut.

Ordinal numerals are formed by the suffix -Du'ar > -Da'ar, but the shape of the stem often deviates from that of the cardinal, as seen in the table below, and there are suppletive forms for 'first' and 'second', although the less common regular ones are attested in composite numerals. The suffix -tu/-ta and the Turkic loan -cin are attested with the same function.

	Cardinals	Ordinals
1	niken	teri'ün (niketü'er)
2	qoyar (feminine jirin)	nökö'e (qoyadu'ar)
3	qurban	qutu'ar
4	dörben	dötu'er
5	tabun	tab(u)tu'ar
6	jirqo'an, jirwa'an	*jirqotu'ar (> jirghudaar in Arabic sources)
7	dolo'an	dolodu'ar
8	naiman	*naimandu'ar (> naimandaar in Arabic sources)
9	yisün	*yisüdu'ar (> yisüde'er in Arabic sources)
20	qorin	qoridu'ar

There are also suffixes for collectives (-'ula, 'X number together'), distributives ('-aD 'X number each'), and multiplicatives '-ta 'X times'.

== Sample text ==
The following is an excerpt from the Secret History of the Mongols, §§ 4-6.

Text	Translation
1. ...Toroqoljinu köün Duwa Soqor, Dobun Mergen qoyar bülee.	1. ... The sons of Toroqoljin were two: Duwa Soqor (and) Dobun Mergen.
2. Duwa Soqor, maŋlay dumda qaqca nidütü, qurban neürid qajara qaraqu bülee.	2. Duwa Soqor, having a single eye in the middle of (his) forehead, was capable of peering at a place (at a distance) of three journeys.
3. Niken üdür Duwa Soqor Dobun Mergen deülüebeen Burqan Qaldun deere qarba.	3. One day, Duwa Soqor went up on (the mountain) Burhan Haldun with his younger brother Dobun Mergen.
4. Duwa Soqor, Burqan Qaldun deerece qaraju,	4. Duwa Soqor, peering from on top of Burhan Haldun,
5. Tüŋgelig qoroqan huruu niken bölög irgen newüjü, oroju ayisuquyi qaraju üjejü,	5. seeing a band of people journeying, coming (and) about to approach down the Tüŋgelig stream,
6. ügülerün: ”Tede newüjü ayisuqun irgenü dotora	6. saying: “In (the midst of) those people who are about to approach, journeying,
7. niken qarautay tergenü öljigede niken ökin sayin buyu.	7. at the front part of one black cart, it turns out that (there is) one maiden (who) is good.
8. Güüne ese ögtegsen böesü, Dobun Mergen deüdeen cimada quyuya!” keejü,	8. If she is not (yet) given to a man, let us request (her) for you, my younger brother Dobun Mergen!”,
9. Dobun Mergen deüyüen üjere ileba.	9. sent his younger brother Dobun Mergen to see (her).

== See also ==
- Praise of Mahakala
- Inscription of Hüis Tolgoi
