= Wangchingbala =

- Born: Wangchingbala c. 1795
- Died: 1847
- Occupations: Historian, novelist

Wangchingbala (Vanchinbal, vangčinbala, Ванчинбал, ᠸᠠᠩᠴᠢᠨᠪᠠᠯ) (c. 1795 – 1847) was a Mongolian writer, historian, nobleman and official.

== Biography ==
He was a Tumed Chinggisid soldier, nobleman and high official. Wangchingbala started writing Köke sudur ("The Blue Chronicle", or "Blue Book of the Yuan Empire") in the 19th century, probably in 1830. This historical novel tells about the rise and fall of the Yuan dynasty in the 13th and 14th centuries. Wangchingbala was concerned about the fate of his nation in the "decaying Qing Empire."

He did not finish his novel, but it was completed by his son, Injannashi. He had a total of eight sons, four of whom wrote thoughtful lyrics. These were Gungnechuke (1832–66), Gularansa (1820s–51), Sungweidanjung (1834–after 1898) and Injannashi.

Beside finishing his father's novel, Injannashi also wrote two other novels, numerous poems, and essays.
