= Bugut inscription =

6th century multilingual text in Mongolia

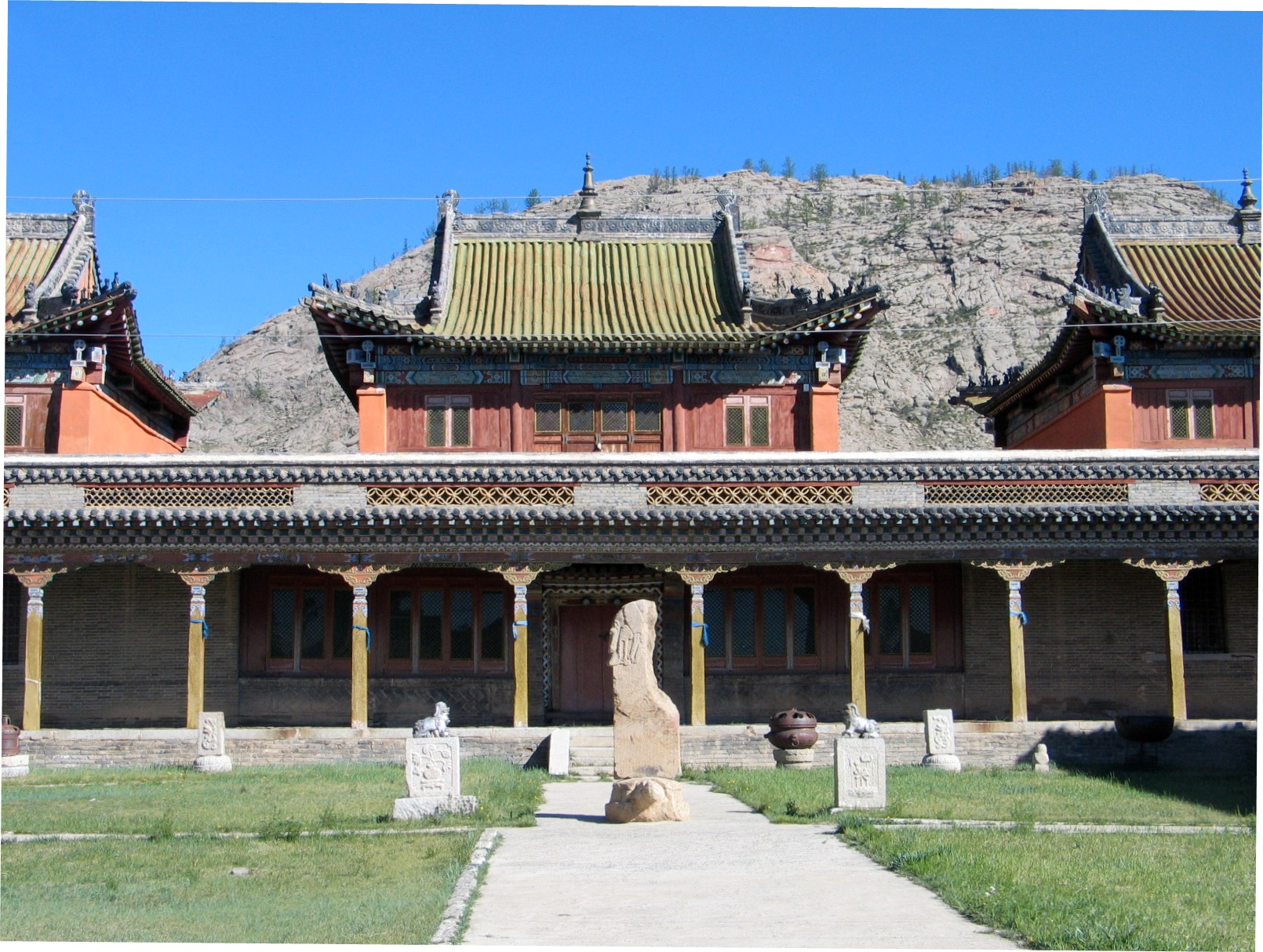
The Bugut inscription, dated 584 CE, placed in front of the Zayiin Gegeen Monastery (built in 1631) in Tsetserleg, Mongolia

The Bugut inscription (Mongolian: Бугут, romanized: Bugut) is a multi-lingual inscription first discovered in Ikh-Tamir sum of Arkhangai Province, Mongolia. The inscription is dated to 584 CE and was dedicated to Taspar Khagan (reigned 572–581) the fourth Khagan of the Turkic Khaganate.

The inscription is in the form of a monumental stele 198 cm high that sits on a turtle base 47 cm high. The front, right and left side of the stele has a Sogdian inscription written with Sogdian alphabet. The back side has a possibly Rouran inscription written with Brahmi script.

The original location of the inscription, shows evidence of a walled complex. The wall embankment is 59mx30m with an inner moat 4.5m wide and 2m deep. In the center of the walled complex was a temple whose wooden pillars and roof tiles were still visible on the ground. Only a few brick fragments were found. The inscription itself was found within the walls on a square platform 7.5mx7.5m made of layered stones.

== History of discovery and research ==
In 1956, Mongolian archeologist Ts. Dorzhsuren discovered a robbed burial complex of the First Turkic Khaganate era on the west bank of the Bayantsagaan river, a tributary of the Northern Tamir river. He decided the site to be not worth excavating, but a stele and a stone tortoise were moved to the Arkhangai regional museum, where they reside to this day. Initial suggestion by B. Rinchen was that the inscription was in Uyghur; but in 1969-1970 Soviet scholars, who participated in a major expedition, identified the language and script of the larger and better conserved inscription as Sogdian. They initially suggested that the other one was in Aramaic script, but by 1972 later corrected themselves to Sanskrit written in vertical Brahmi.

In the 1970s Turkish researchers joined the Soviets and Mongolians in studying the Sogdian inscription, and in the 1990s Turkish and Japanese archeologists organized several expeditions to the original site. In the 2000s, a German epigraphist specializing on Brahmi scripts, Dieter Maue, grew interested in the topic and attempted a new reading. Together with A. Vovin, they were able to identify the language as an early stage of Mongolian in 2014, and in the same year they joined a large international team to carry out a field expedition, results of which were reported in 2017.

== Historical context ==
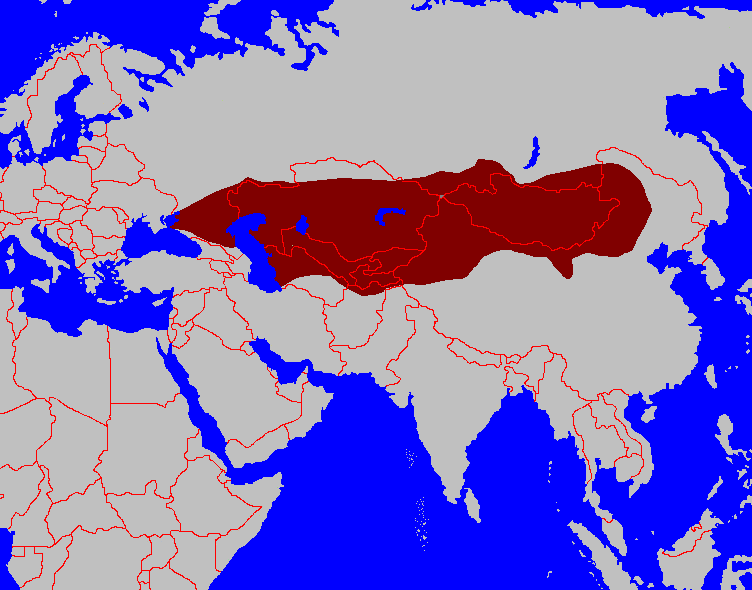
Turkic Khaganate at its greatest extent in 576 CE

The stele was erected in 584 CE with a latest date of 587 CE. It is dedicated to Taspar Khagan who is also called Tatpar Khagan. By this time the Turkic Khaganate stretched from Manchuria to the Black Sea. It controlled the Silk Road while its imperial seat of power was in central Mongolia. The Turkic Khaganate replaced their previous overlords the Rouran Khaganate (also called Ruanruan) in 552 with the help of the Western Wei. The Gokturks proceeded to defeat the Hepthalites with the help of the Sasanian Empire of Persia in 560 CE. The defeat of the Rouran and Hephthalites and their pursuit by the Turks precipitated the migration of the Avars into Eastern Europe. Charlemagne would ultimately accept their surrender in 798 at Aachen and send one native chief, baptised Abraham, back to Avaria with the ancient title of khagan. The Turks allied with the Byzantine Empire against the Sasanians. Byzantine envoy Zemarchus visited Istemi Khagan in the Altai Mountains (Golden Mountains) in 569. The Sogdian language of the inscriptions reflects the prominence of Sogdians on the Silk Road. Sogdians were East Iranians from Sogdia, one of the satrapies of the Achaemenid Empire. The Mongolic Rouran inscription reflects the influence of the previous Rouran Khaganate. The title Khagan was first used by the Rourans who were an offshoot of the Xianbei similar to the Tuoba, Khitan, Tuyuhun and Shiwei (Mongols). Some Rouran nobility were Buddhists. The wolf at the top of the stele reflects the Turks' belief in their origin from a wolf like the Mongols. The vertical orientation of the inscriptions and the turtle base reflects cultural influence from China. The Inscription of Hüis Tolgoi is another inscription found in Mongolia, dated to 604 to 620 CE, with a Brahmi Mongolic text.

== Sogdian inscription ==
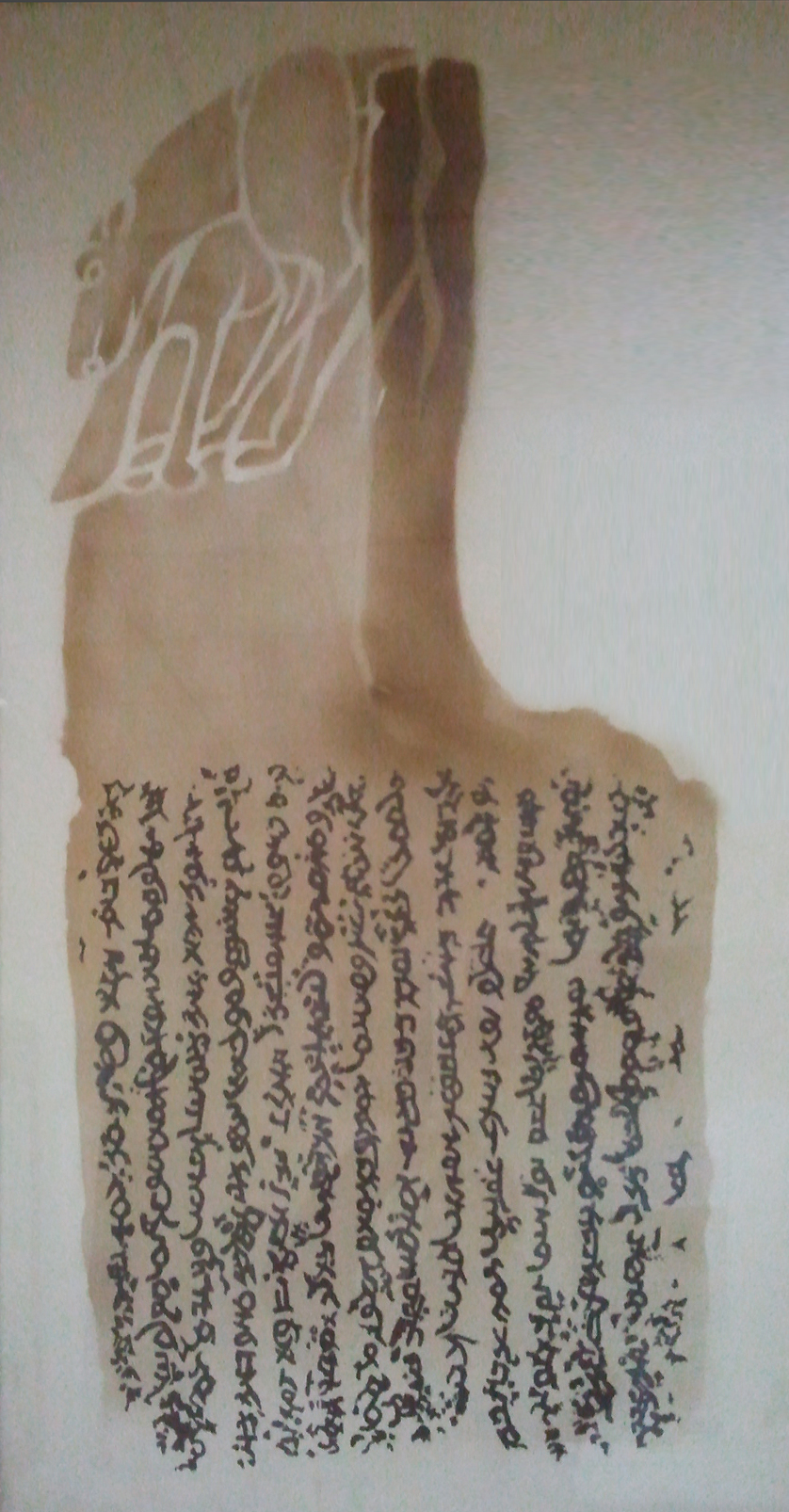
Rubbing of the Sogdian text of the Bugut inscription

The Sogdian inscription has the following text:

(Left Side)(‘mwh?) […] (pt)s’kh ‘ws’t δ’r’nt tr’wkt c(yn)st’n kwt(s)’tt ‘γšywn’k (‘YK) [lacuna of some 15 letters] (ZK?)trwkc βγy nw’’r γ’γ’n ‘wskwp’r ckn’cw mγ’n (tykyn pr)[w] (γ’γ’n wy’k) w’(š)t ‘(X)RZY nwkr ZK βγy mwγ’n γ’γ’n ‘PZY βγy mγ’n tyky(n) [lacuna of 5–6 letters, perhaps cyw’nt?] pyštrw?) k’w ‘wrts’r prm prw ‘nγt’k ‘βc’npδ ‘swšwyn’tt wm’[t’nt] [lacuna of some 25 letters] (t ‘XRYZ n)wkr cyw’nt pyštrw βγy m[wγ’n γ’γ’n](Front Side) [lacuna of 35–40 letters] (w) k’w βγy s’r pwrsty rty nw(k)r (k..) […] [lacuna of 30–35 letters] (‘YK?) š’δpyt trγw’nt γwrγ’p(‘)ynt twδwnt s(nk) [wnt][lacuna of 10–12 letters] (t rty pyšt)rw (….t?) [8–10 letters] y tw’ γwyštr ‘XY mwγ’n γ’γ’n pr’yt rty (…) [lacuna of some 15 letters] K(S)Pw (‘n) [β] (γ)t δ’r[t rty n’β] (cy)h šyr’k p’rtw δ’rt rty ms ‘kδry tγw βγy mγ’[n](tyk)[yn] γ[šywny…] (…)δ(…..) rty [about 8 letters] (δ’rt rty) ‘pw ‘nγwncyδ γšywny n’β(c)yh p’r rty nw(k)(βγy mγ’n ty)[kyn lacuna of some 25 letters s](γ)wn ptγwštw δ’rt rty γrγwšk srδy (.)[…](.w’št?)(wγwšw ?) srδ (γš)y(wny.) [lacuna of some 15 letters, βγy t’sp’r] (γ’γ’n) k’w βγyšt s’r pwrst rty pyštrw š’δpyt trγw[‘nt]γwrγ’p’ynt (snk)[wnt] (twδ)[w]nt (’PZY) […](.n) [read [γ’γ](‘n)?] wk[wrtpt](s)dtw δ’rnt rty nwkr βγβwmyn[/i] [so instead of βγy βwmyn] γ’γ’n p’δy (s’r) [….](δ’rt kt?) [….]t rty βγ[y βwmyn] (yn γ’ γ’n) pr(m)’t δ’rt (k)t’yβ βγ’ t’sp’r γ’ γ’n wsn RBk(‘)[lacuna, some 20 letters] (.t) […] (..)rt(y) [w’n’w?] pr(m)’tw δ’rt RBkw nw(h) snk’ ‘wast rty ‘YK nw(k) [r][lacuna, some 20 letters] (.npš ?) [lacuna, about 8 letters] rty βγ’ [instead of βγy] t’(sp’r) γ’γ’n tr(‘γ)t ‘cw npyšnt cw krnw(‘ncy’k?)[h][lacuna, some 40 letters] (…)cw γwrγ(‘)p’ynt cwty wkwrt cw n’βcy’kh ‘(st’t?)[lacuna, some 40 letters] (y) β’r’k ‘sp’δy’n (wr’yt) ‘yt myδ ‘nβγt δ’r’nt [lacuna, some 40 letters] (sγwn) ptγwštw δ’r’nt rty cyw’nt pyštrw […] [lacuna, some 40 letters] (…tw) δ’rt (….t) rty c’n’w δw’ γšywnk [lacuna, some 40 letters] (…tw) δ’r’nt rty (…) šyr’k βrtpδ m’tnt rty [lacuna, some 40 letters] (…n’βcy’kh ?....) p(tsγt’k ?) ‘sp’δ m(…) [lacuna, some 40 letters] (…wyškrtw ?) δ’r’nt (…)[lacuna, some 40 letters] (…)δw’ šyrγw(štt)w m’(t)[‘nt] (Right Side) [lacuna, some 40 letters] (.k?) šyr’k krt(k) [‘krtw?] δ’rt rt[y…] [lacuna, some 40 letters] (s)δtw (δ’r’nt) šyr’k (šy)r’k krtk ‘’βry(t) [δ’r’nt ?] [lacuna, some 40 letters] (….’cw ?) [n’β](c)yh mrt(γm)’k ‘st’t ‘XRYZ (βγym)[γ’n tykyn?] [lacuna, some 40 letters] (‘XRZY βγy ?) […](š)t (nws) [’ws, nwš or nyš ?] (.)wk’ [(p)wk’ or (‘)wk/’ ?] trγw’n ‘YK (m)γ(‘) [n tykn] [illegible traces of letters].

This was translated into English by Sergej G. Kljaštornyj and Vladimir A. Livšic:

(Left Side) This stele was erected by the Turks (under) Kwts’tt the ruler of China when … … the Turkish lord Nivar-qaghan. Since Mahan- –tegin ascended the place of qaghan, the lord Muhan-qaghan and the lord Mahan-tegin after [that they] were saviours for the whole world during a long period [lit. after that and in the future] … … … And now thereupon, after this, the lord M[uhan-qaghan] (Front Side) [… died. And …] asks the God, and then … … … When (?)šadapït(s), tarkhwans, qurqapïns, tuduns, säng[üns] [approved (?)] and after that [thus addressed him]: ‘Your elder brother Muhan-qaghan died. And … … [he well (?)] distributed the money [and] well fed [the peo]ple. And thus now you, lord Maha[n]- –tegin, ………, and feed the people without such a ruler!’ And now the lord Mahan-te[gin ….], he listened to this words and in the Hare year … ascended (?) six(?) years he ruled […. The lord Taspar (?)]-qaghan asked the gods. And then šadapïts, tarkhw[ans] qurqapïns, sängüns, tuduns, the kinsmen (of the qaghan) approved. And then he addressed the adobe of the lord Bumïn-qaghan thus: ‘[show!]’. And the lord Bumïn-qaghan ordered: ‘Oh lord, Taspar-qaghan! You must … for the sake of the great […..] and he ordered: ‘Establish a great new samgha!’ And then when […..] and the lord Taspar-qaghan was distressed, [whether there was] anybody of the grandsons who [had] the ability (?) […..] … is there anybody of the qurqapïns, of the kinsmen, of the people … and equestarian warrior(s) thus distributed the prey(?) [….] they heard [these] words and after this […] [….] he ….. And as the two rulers […..] they … and … they were full of knowledge and […] the people(?) … an equipped (?) army ….. […..] they conquered (?) ….. […..] they were friends (Right Side) […..] he accomplished many good deeds. And …..[…..] they approved, ‘very (or: many) good deeds’ – they praised […..] is there any such man among the people [who would be able …?]. And the lord M[ahan-tegin ?] .[…..] And the lord (?) … (.)uka-tarkhwan, when Maha[n-tegin] [illegible traces of letters].

== Brahmi Mongolic inscription ==
Rouran original:...Tadpar Mugan qagan sa-nam cig-du...++bi++tu Tadpar qa cog-nar oro-ga-ju++...dig-n qa-n herte ku++ quri-r ndu-ti-ju qapa bar-ju gele-lupe-r ku...+cu-d-par dar-p-ta taga ayu-?-?C-cu...+++gacar haru tar-ju jar-n++...purupu tal-u-ja-r/ju Asvar-un ordu-da...-tu++ -un jar-va-r janti-ju...qa-d habv-ca xa+ mede-ju++++...-nar puneken puker-ner Tadpar tala-...-quy nabu-d botugna-s qoniy ire-y...qagan-u +-gtir jalva-y Tadpar +?...-ciliA-at ken hirge-c ......para-n qora-pi kebir qajar-a (?)...ol-ga-ba ku ceker-de a-qsa +...+ -tu + kuju-tu ken-u gar-par...++-la kobe'u-d gele-run da+hig...+-d-un teme ingi-ner aci-sar-ju...+++bule-ku-per qa-d qagan	English translation (tentative):...when Tadpar and Mugan qagans resided [together]...Tadpar qagan made the nobles enter, and...the qagan, who passed away, earlier...creating gathering with all [their] strength shut [themselves] in and talked...when the enemies were defeated by members, [they] were afraid and...hurried to scatter in the back of the land......the fact that they heavily plundered together and at Isbara's camp...with [he?] hit the messengers of X-GEN...taking princes...knowing......Tadpar will capture X-PLUR, foxes and oxen...nabu, camel calves and sheep, which...came and...connecting to qagan's X, Tadpar......after making N into V, who from the people......people...poison at the steppe lands...were made to receive...and were empty......by...by whose strong hands...do X! As sons said......loading male and female camels of X-PLUR and...by the churning, princes [and] qagan

This is Alexander Vovin's tentative translation.
