= Chosgi Odsir =

Lamaist scholar, writer, translator and monk

- Born: Chosgi Odsir; 1260; Borderlands of Tibet-Qinghai-Xinjiang
- Died: 1320 (aged 59–60)
- Occupations: Translator, writer
- Writing career
- Notable work: Praise of Mahakala

Chosgi Odsir (Choiji Odser, Chogsi Odser, Chos kyi 'Od) (1260–1320) was a Lamaist scholar, writer, translator into Mongolian and Buddhist monk. He was the teacher of Shirab Sengge.

He was born in the Tibet-Qinghai-Xinjiang border, and was probably of Oirat or Uighur ethnicity. He started studying at the Sakyapa ("red hat") order in Tibet early on in his life. There, he learned to read and write in Mongol, Tibetan and Uighur. At 35 he had mastered the five sciences of Buddhism. In 1295 he started to translate the Praise of Mahakala into Mongolian. He also compiled his Dictionary of Poetics and the Zürken Tolt, a book on the Mongolian language.

The long Buddhist poem translated by Chogsi in the early 14th century was published with his benediction in 1312. In addition to the prose translation of the poem, he added a commentary in alliterative quatrains. In 1312 he translated and published the Bodhisattvacaryāvatāra, a Mahāyāna Buddhist text written in the eight century in Sanskrit verse by Shantideva (Śāntideva), a Buddhist monk at Nālandā Monastic University in India, where it was also composed. Further, he compiled a Tibetan version of the Lalitavistara, the "Twelve deeds [of Buddha]," which was left unfinished.

His disciple Shirab Sengge continued his work of translation into Mongolian, translating the last of the Lalitavistara's twelve deeds. His disciple also translated the Suvarṇaprabhāsa Sūtra, known in Mongolian as the Altan gerel ("Golden Beam"), as well as a life of Buddha.
