= Shirab Sengge =

14th-century Mongolian monk

Shirab Sengge (Shereb Sengge) (fl. early 14th century) was a Mongol monk, writer and translator into Mongolian. Though the ethnic background of the Tibetan monks translating into Mongolian at the time is uncertain, it is likely that Shirab Sengge was a Mongol. Among his works are the translation of the last deed of the Twelve deeds of Buddha of the Lalitavistara; the Suvarṇaprabhāsa Sūtra, and the Pañcarakṣā. These translations are especially important, because they are written in the tantric idiom.

== Biography ==
He was the disciple of Chosgi Odsir, a Buddhist monk who translated a long Buddhist poem into Mongolian in the early 14th century, which was published with his own commentary and benediction in 1312.

His teacher also translated and published the Bodhisattvacaryāvatāra, a Mahāyāna Buddhist text written in the eight century in Sanskrit verse by Shantideva (Śāntideva), a Buddhist monk at Nālandā Monastic University in India, where it was also composed. His master later compiled a Tibetan version of the Lalitavistara, the "Twelve deeds [of Buddha]."

Shirab Sengge continued the work of his master, translating the last of the Lalitavistara's Twelve deeds of the Buddha. He also translated a life of Buddha. Further, he translated the Pañcarakṣā ("Fivefold Protection"), an early work in the dhāraṇī genre of Buddhist literature, with a text that includes spells, a list of benefits by its recitation, and the ritual instructions on how and when to use it, and the Suvarṇaprabhāsa Sūtra ("Golden Light Sutra"), known in Mongolian as Altan gerel ("Golden Beam"), teaching that the Four Heavenly Kings (Chinese: 四大天王; pinyin: Sì Dàtiānwáng) protect the ruler who governs his country in the proper manner. The sutra also expounds the vows of the goddesses Sarasvatī, Lakṣmī and Dṛḍhā to protect any bhikṣu who will uphold and teach the sutra.

The translation of the Lalitavistara, the Altan gerel (Suvarṇaprabhāsa Sūtra) and the Pañcarakṣā are especially important, because they are written in the tantric idiom, that is, "an exposition given in terms of magical transformations, spells, and overcoming demons."
