= Praise of Mahakala =

14th-century Mongolian Buddhist poem

The Praise of Mahākāla is a Mongolian Buddhist poem written in the Mongolian script by an Oirat or Uyghur scholar of the Sakya school, Choiji Odser (chos kyi 'od gser).

The poem is one of the many manuscripts found at Turfan. It dates from around 1305 and shows evidence of woodblock printing during that time. The poem is written in traditional Mongolian poetical style and rhyme such as that found in The Secret History of the Mongols and provides a valuable insight into Middle Mongol.

== Choiji Odser ==
Choiji Odser (Mongolian: Чойжи-Одсэр, [ˈtʃʰɞe̯.tʃ˭ɪ ˈɔt.sər]; 1260–1320), whose name may be translated as "Light of the Dharma", was a famous scholar during the early Yuan dynasty who played a major role in standardizing the Mongolian language and script. He produced the first work on Mongolian grammar in 1305 and translated many works from Sanskrit and Tibetan. There is a great deal of information about him in Mongolian, Chinese and Tibetan sources. He was the guru and spiritual advisor to Külüg Khan, who was the Yuan emperor. In the 24th book of the History of Yuan, his erudition is praised and it is written that he was awarded ten thousand paper money notes. Only the 12 last pages remain from his ten chapter Commentary on the Bodhisattvacaryāvatāra (also found at Turpan) and it is written at the end of this same work that he had one thousand copies printed at the Miaoying Temple in Khanbaliq (now Beijing) in 1312.

== The original text in Mongolian (modernized pronunciation) ==
| Mongolian: Hamgaa gaihuulsan erdmiig chin (original: Qamuγ-a γaiqaγuluγsan erdem-i činü) Hagarhaiya holbon magtsugai (Qaγaraqay-a qolban maγtasuγai) Dorvon gartai, negen niguurtai (Dörben γar-tai nigen niγur-tai) Dugreg ulaan gurvan nudtei (Dügerig ulaγan γurban nidütei) Torolh urgasan shar ustei (Törölki urγuγsan šira üsütei) Tugel humuuniig zuusan araatai (Tügel kümün-i jaγuγsan araγ-a-tai) Urin gemuudiig ogtolruun (Urin gem-üd-i oγtolor-un) Urd baruun gartaa ildtei (Uridu baraγun γar-taγan üldütei) Olon sejgiig tarhaaruun (Olan sešig-i tarγaγar-un) Ulam nogoo gart gavaltai (Ulam nögüge γar-tur kabala-tai) Deerhi asursiig darruun Deed zuun gartaa jadtai Delgesen orongot sereeg Ded doord gart barisan Zaluu turihan tsaraitai Zaanii arisan tsamtstai Zarimlan uhriin arisand Zalgasan ilt nuruuvchtai Baatar amit arslang Baruun chihendee suihtei Baraan ereen mogoig Bas zuun chihendee suihtei (…) (…) Holboj huzuundee erihtei Har nuguud mogoi bustei Hamgaa hii met huchtei Gaihamshig holog hurd Halzan iljig hologtei Hoh ogtorgui dahi nariig Holsnii tusaar urguulj Holoo tomor chodroor Husuulen chimsen Mahagali Chinii duug sonsvoos Chin Sumber tag beer hodlood Tsustan daisdiin zurhiig Chanaraas shilguutgegch Mahagali Amurlisan setgelt bogootol Ad totgodiig ayugturuun Aguulsan chanariig uzuulj Alaraa hurgegch Mahagali Eldev huvilgaan gargaj Erhten tengers asursiig Esreg oortoo sogtgoson Erdemtei bogd Mahagali Saivaar odsonii ilt Shashin nomiig evdegchin Samuu muu setgeltniig Shamshaasugai gegeen Mahagali Edugee tuun (…) Erdemten nomchniig sahiad Ed el yavahuun amitniig Enh amruul Mahagali Chanar muu setgej buruun Chihend saihan oguulegchin Tsustan daisan adsiig Chinii hucheer butaltugai Nomiin ezen, haan, hatun Nomchin said, hovguud ohid Noyod hurged bugdiig Nohtson sahitugai Mahagali Hutagtai chinii erdmiig Holboj magtsan buyanaar Hotol amitan tonilj Hooson boltugai ene orchihui Ahui erdmiig chini huraaj Ayalguu holbon magtagch Ayagha takhimlig Choiji-Odser Al (…) ba (…) gartugai (…) Egshig duugaaraan duulbaas Ovchin adas hen amirlaad Etsest burhan boltugai. | English translation (literal): Let me eloquently praise in rhymes Your mighty wisdom renowned to all With four arms and unique face With three red circular eyes With naturally growing yellow hair With teeth grinding an entire human You uproot sins of passion With a sword in your front right hand You disperse countless doubts With a skull in your other hand You crush the asuras on high With a spear in your upper left hand Holding an open trident In your next lower hand With a lean young face With an elephant-skin robe With an open back-vestment connected to A half-cut of cowskin With a heroic-hearted lion as An earring on your right ear With a dark and speckled snake as An earring on your left ear too (Line missing) (Line missing) With prayer beads linked around your neck With a black snake as your belt With might that is capable of everything With a bald donkey mount As your amazing wheel-vehicle Making the sun in the blue sky Rise by your sweat Mahakala, who adorns admirably His legs with metal chains If your voice is heard Firm Mount Sumeru quakes Mahakala, who makes quiver from the depths The hearts of bloody enemies Though you are of a peaceful spirit You frighten demons and hindrances Mahakala, who leads towards “alaraa” By showing an “aguulsan” quality The wise divine Mahakala Who by working various wonders Did subject before himself The powerful gods and asuras Punish, luminous Mahakala The evil rebellious spirits Who destroy religion and dharma Though outwardly of the Well-Departed (Buddha). Give rest in peace, Mahakala To all friendly sentient beings While protecting scholars and the devout Now … (line incomplete) May we shatter by your strength Bloody enemy demons Who speak sweetly in the ear Yet wish evil in their hearts Attach yourself to and protect, Mahakala The lord of dharma, king and queen Teachers, ministers, sons and daughters Nobles and sons-in-law, each and everyone. By the merit of praising in these rhymes Your holiness’ mighty wisdom May all beings reach nirvana And may this cycle become empty May the monk Choiji-Odser Who summarizing all your mighty wisdom Melodically offers these rhymed praises Escape … (line incomplete) (line missing) If they sing with their melodious song May all illnesses and demons be pacified And each become Buddhas at the end. |
