= Bayandelger, Töv =

District in Töv, Mongolia

Coordinates: 47°43′37″N 108°06′42″E

Bayandelger District Баяндэлгэр сум ᠪᠶ᠋ᠠᠨᠳᠡᠯᠭᠡᠷᠰᠤᠮᠤ
- District
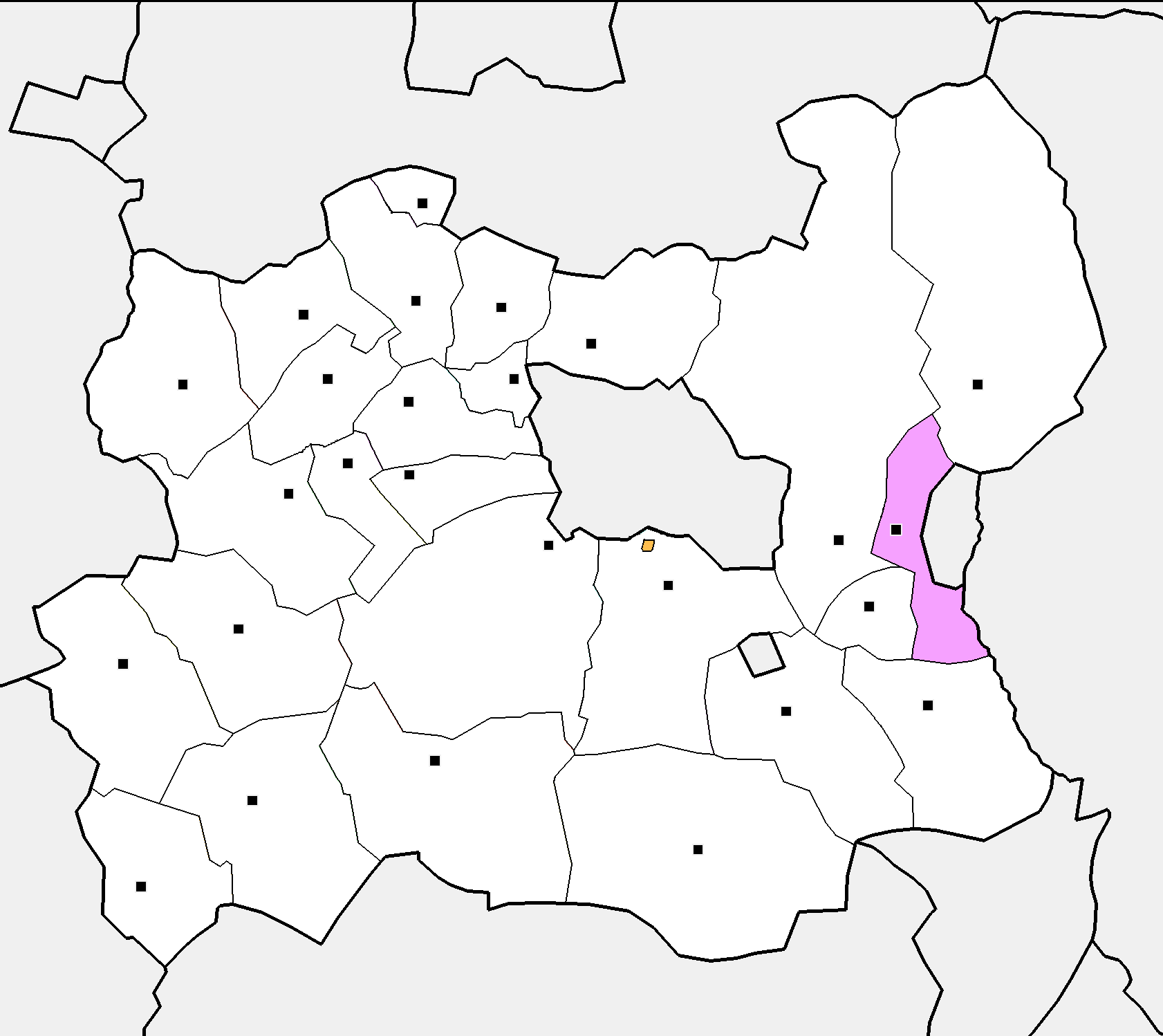
- Country: Mongolia
- Province: Töv Province
- Time zone: UTC+8 (UTC + 8)

Bayandelger (Mongolian: Баяндэлгэр [páiˑntɘɬkɘr̥]) is a district in the west of Mongolia's Töv Province. As of the 2005 census, it had a population of 1,226 inhabitants in 429 households.

== History ==
The district (or sum) was founded in 1923 under the name Gün (Гүн [kuɴ]) and as part of the khoshuu of Darkhan Khoshoi Chin Wang Puntsogtsereng in the Tüsheet Khan aimag. 1924 it was renamed to Batdelger uulyn sum, and in 1931 it was renamed again. In 1956 it was split between the Bayan and Erdene sums, with most of the territory going to the latter. In 1959, the Bayandelger sum was re-established.

== Administrative divisions ==
The district is divided into two bags, which are:

- Baidlag
- Galuut

== Livestock ==
In 2004, there were 64,000 heads of livestock, including 19,000 goats, 35,000 sheep, 3,500 heads of cattle, 6900 horses and 71 camels.

== Notable natives ==
Dashdorjiin Natsagdorj was born in what is now Bayandelger sum.
