= Vanchinbalyn Injinash =

Mongolian poet, novelist and historian

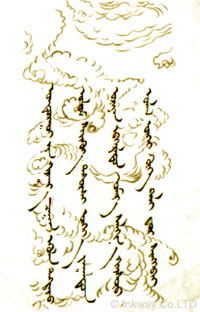
Poem "White cloud" composed and brush-written by Injinash during childhood

Vanchinbalyn Injinash (Mongolian: Ванчинбалын Инжаннаш, Classical Mongolian: ᠸᠠᠩᠴᠢᠨᠪᠠᠯ ᠤᠨ
ᠢᠨᠵᠢᠨᠤᠰᠢ, inǰannasi) (c. 1837–1892) was a Mongolian poet, novelist and historian from a Mongol area in modern-day Liaoning, China.

His verses, stories and novels are distinguished by their markedly civic sentiments and strong social criticism. The Blue Chronicle, a historical novel, is perhaps one of his best known works, it is about the events of the 13th century, and upholds humanistic and profoundly patriotic ideals.

In another of his important works, One-Storey Pavilion, a two-part social novel, he describes life in southern Inner Mongolia, and the tragic fate of its young people under the Manchu yoke, and their struggle for human dignity.

One-Storey Pavilion and another novel The Chamber of Red Tears bear a striking resemblance to Chinese literature such as Dream of the Red Chamber. In addition, they contain a considerable number of Chinese loan words and direct translations from Chinese, which are difficult for readers unfamiliar with Chinese to understand. However, he continued to write Mongolian and never adopted a pro-Chinese stance.

Injinash's works were translated into Chinese, English, Russian and German languages after the 1930s.

== Life ==
He was born in Tümed Right Wing Banner of Josutu League, Inner Mongolia (modern-day, Beipiao, Chaoyang, Liaoning Province). He had a childhood name Khaschuluu (qasčilaɣu, Хасчулуу, ᠬᠠᠰᠤᠴᠢᠯᠠᠭᠤ), Chinese name Baoying (寶瑛) and courtesy name Runting (潤亭). His father Vanchinbal (vangčinbala, Ванчинбал, ᠸᠠᠩᠴᠢᠨᠪᠠᠯ) was a taiji (Mongol title), and hence, a descendant of Genghis Khan. Injinash's mother was Vanchinbal taiji's lady Mayukha. Vanchinbal was a bookcollector of Mongolian, Classical Chinese, Manchu and Tibetan literature. According to Injinash's preface, the first eight chapters of The Blue Chronicle were written by Vanchinbal. His family was highly literate in Mongolian, Manchu, and Chinese languages.

His father, Vanchinbal, was a banner administrator of Tümed Right Banner (modern Beipiao county, Liaoning province) and his position was inherited by two of his sons, Gularansa (1820–51) and Süngwaidanjung (1834–98). These two also translated the Chinese novel: Shuihu zhuan (Water Margin) into Mongolian, and like their middle brother, Gungnechuke (1832–66), were poets. Injinash claimed he worked on The Blue Chronicle with his two brothers. Injinash married twice and his first wife was the daughter of a Kharchin prince and had two sons.

As Tümed Right Wing Banner was close to China, it was subjected to an enormous population pressure from China. By the time Injinash was born, the banner has been transformed into agricultural land by the Chinese, who outnumbered the indigenous Mongols. Apparently, this situation led Injinash to depicts in The Blue Chronicle (Mongolian: Köke Sudar) the glorious past of the Mongols of Genghis Khan's time.

A rebellion by his family's Chinese tenants in 1870 and the failure of the Injinash family's investment in a coal mine caused financial distress. The ethnic tensions between the Mongols and Chinese resulted in the Jindandao Incident of 1891. The Chinese rebels massacred tens of thousands of Mongols and devastated the Mongol society of the Josutu and Ju'udu Leagues. These factors forced Injinash to flee to Jinzhou, and he died in Liaoning on 25 February 1892.

== Works ==
- The Blue Chronicle (köke sudur, Хөх судар (Khökh Sudar))
- The Chamber of Red Tears (ulaɣan-a ukilaqu tingkim, Улаанаа Ухилах танхим (Ulaanaa Ukhilakh Tankhim))
- One-Storey Pavilion (nigen dabqur asar, Нэгэн Давхар Асар (Negen Davkhar Asar))
