= Stele of Genghis Khan =

Stele containing the first known inscription written in Mongolian Script

- Чингисийн чулууны бичиг ᠴᠢᠩᠭᠢᠰ ᠤᠨ ᠴᠢᠯᠠᠭᠤᠨ ᠤ ᠪᠢᠴᠢᠭ
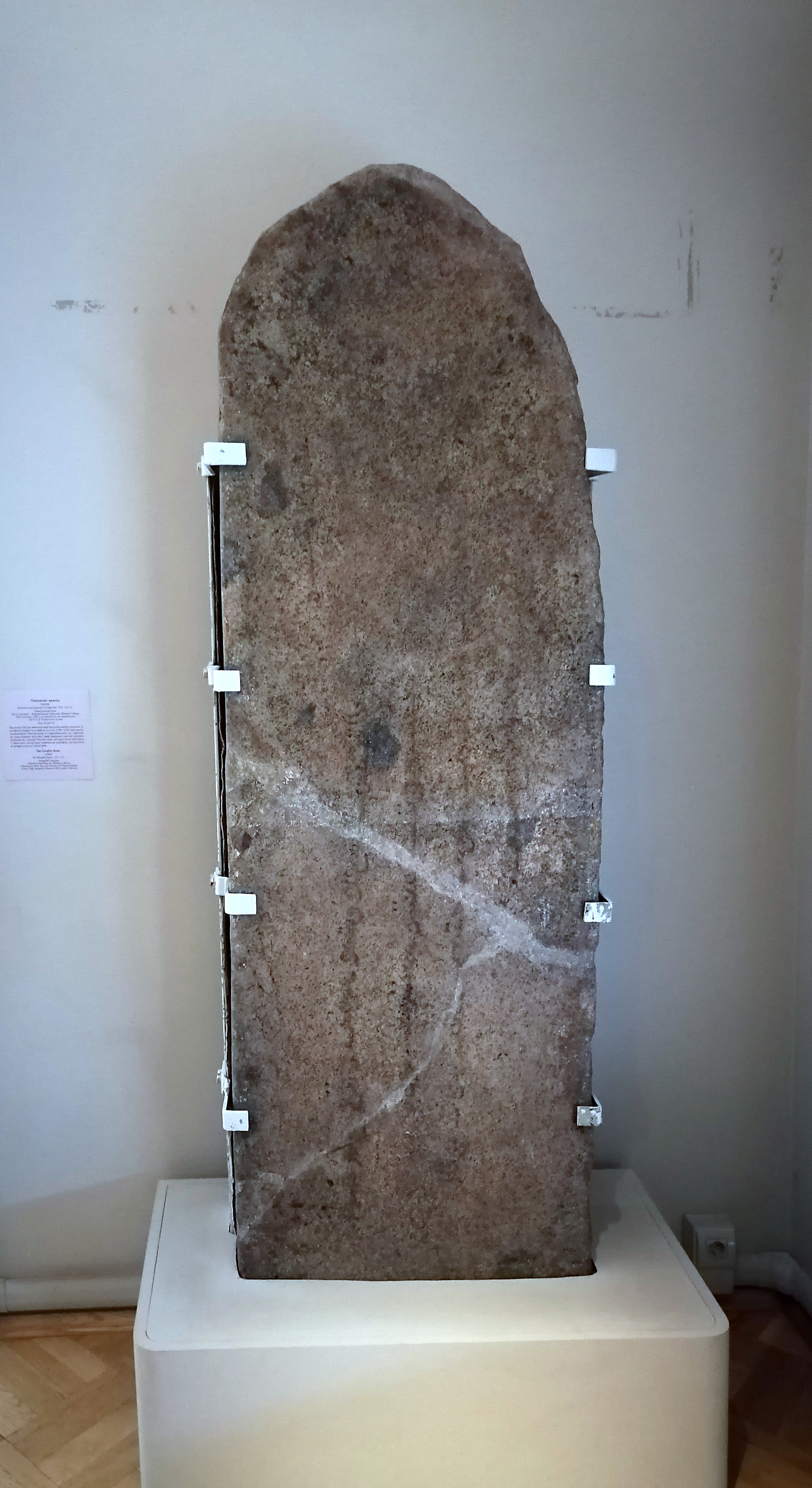
- Material: Granite
- Height: 202 cm
- Width: 74 cm
- Depth: 22 cm
- Writing: Mongolian script
- Created: c. 1224-1225
- Discovered by: Grigory Spassky
- Present location: Hermitage Museum
- Culture: Mongol Empire

The Stele of Genghis Khan (Mongolian: Чингисийн чулууны бичиг, Russian: Чингисов камень), also known as the Stele of Yisüngge, is a granite stele inscribed with a dedication to Yisüngge, nephew of Genghis Khan, for performing a feat of archery during a gathering of noyans after the Mongol conquest of the Khwarazmian Empire, dated to c. 1224–1225. It was discovered in 1802, close to the remains of Khirkhira, a 13th-century settlement in Transbaikal that served as the center of the territories of Qasar and his descendants. Since 1936 it has been kept at the Hermitage Museum in Saint Petersburg, Russia.

It is important for containing the first known inscription in Mongolian Script.

== History ==
According to the inscription, the stele commemorates an event that occurred in the settlement of Buqa Sočiɣai, whose location is unknown. It was found, however, near Khirkhira in the Transbaikal region, which according to the Jami' al-tawarikh, was part of the Ulus of Qasar.

=== Rediscovery ===
The first message about a stone with an inscription carved with "oriental inscriptions" was left by Russian historian and explorer Grigory Spassky in the journal Sibirskii Vestnik (Siberian Bulletin) in 1818. Later it turned out that the stone was discovered in 1802, not far from the remains of a settlement known as Khirkhira. Khirkhira was located on a low terrace above the flood-plain, close to the mouth of the Khirkhira River, which, through the Urulyunguy River, was a tributary of the Argun River.

Local interpreters were able to read the initial two words of the inscription, "Genghis Khan", which led to it being named the "Stele of Genghis Khan". The stele was for a time kept in the "Natural History" room at the mining school of Nerchinsky Zavod. Between 1829 and 1832, along with a load of gold, it was transported to Saint Petersburg, during which period it was accidentally broken in the middle.

Once in Saint Petersburg, it was first transferred to the Ministry of Finance and then to the Academy of Sciences and embedded in the wall in the entrance hall of the Asiatic Museum. In 1936, it was transferred to the Hermitage, to this day occupying a central place in the permanent exhibition of the Mongolian Art Hall in the third floor of the museum.

== Copies ==
Copies of the stele exist in various museums, including the National Museum of Mongolia in Mongolia and the Inner Mongolia Museum in Inner Mongolia.

A volumetric model of the stele was created in 2017 by the Hermitage's Laboratory for Science Restoration of Precious Metals, so that an exact polymer replica could be grown layer-by-layer. The replica was presented to Mongolia in 2019 to be placed in the under-construction Genghis Khan Museum in Ulaanbaatar.

== Inscription ==
The text of the stele consists of 5 lines - the first line, containing the name Genghis Khan is elevated as a sign of respect, as is the fourth line that contains the name of his nephew Yisüngge (but lower than the first). The scribe's writing style is also uncommon, as they write a few distinct letters with the same forms, such as ᠭ (ɣ) and ᠬ (q), making the stele somewhat difficult to read.

According to Igor de Rachewiltz (2010), the inscription reads (with letters in parentheses being unclear):

Traditional Mongolian script	Transcription	English translation
ᠴᠢᠩᠭᠢᠰ ᠬᠠᠭᠠᠨ ‍ᠢ ᠰᠠᠷᠲᠠᠭᠣᠯ ᠢᠷᠭᠡ ᠳᠠᠣᠯᠢᠵᠦ ᠪᠠᠭᠣᠵᠣ ᠬᠠᠮᠦᠬ ᠮᠣᠩᠭᠣᠯ ᠣᠯᠣᠰ ‍ᠣᠨ ᠨᠣᠶᠠᠳ ‍ᠢ ᠪᠣᠬᠠ ᠰᠣᠴᠢᠭᠠᠢ ᠬᠣᠷᠢᠭᠰᠠᠨ ᠳᠣᠷ ᠶᠢᠰᠦᠩᠭᠡ ᠣᠵᠣᠨᠣᠳᠦᠷ ‍ᠣᠨ ᠬᠣᠷᠪᠠᠨ ᠵᠠᠭᠣᠳ ᠭᠣᠴᠢᠨ ᠲᠠᠪᠣᠨ ᠠᠯᠳᠠᠰ ᠲᠣᠷ ᠣᠨᠳᠣᠣᠵᠯᠠᠭ ‍ᠠ	Činggis Qaɣan-i; Sartaɣul irge dauliju baɣuju qamuɣ Mongɣol ulus-un (n)oyad-i Buqa Sočiɣai quriɣsan-dur Yisüngge o(j)unudur-un ɣurban jaɣud ɣučin tabun aldas- tur o(n)duu(n)laɣ-a.	When Genghis Khan, having subjugated the Sartaɣul people set up camp and the noblemen of the entire Mongol nation had gathered at Buqa Sočiɣai, Yisüngge shot an arrow a distance of 335 alds.

As the ald is a unit of measure equal to the length between someone's outstretched arms, approximating 160 cm = one ald results in 335 ald being equal to ~536 m.

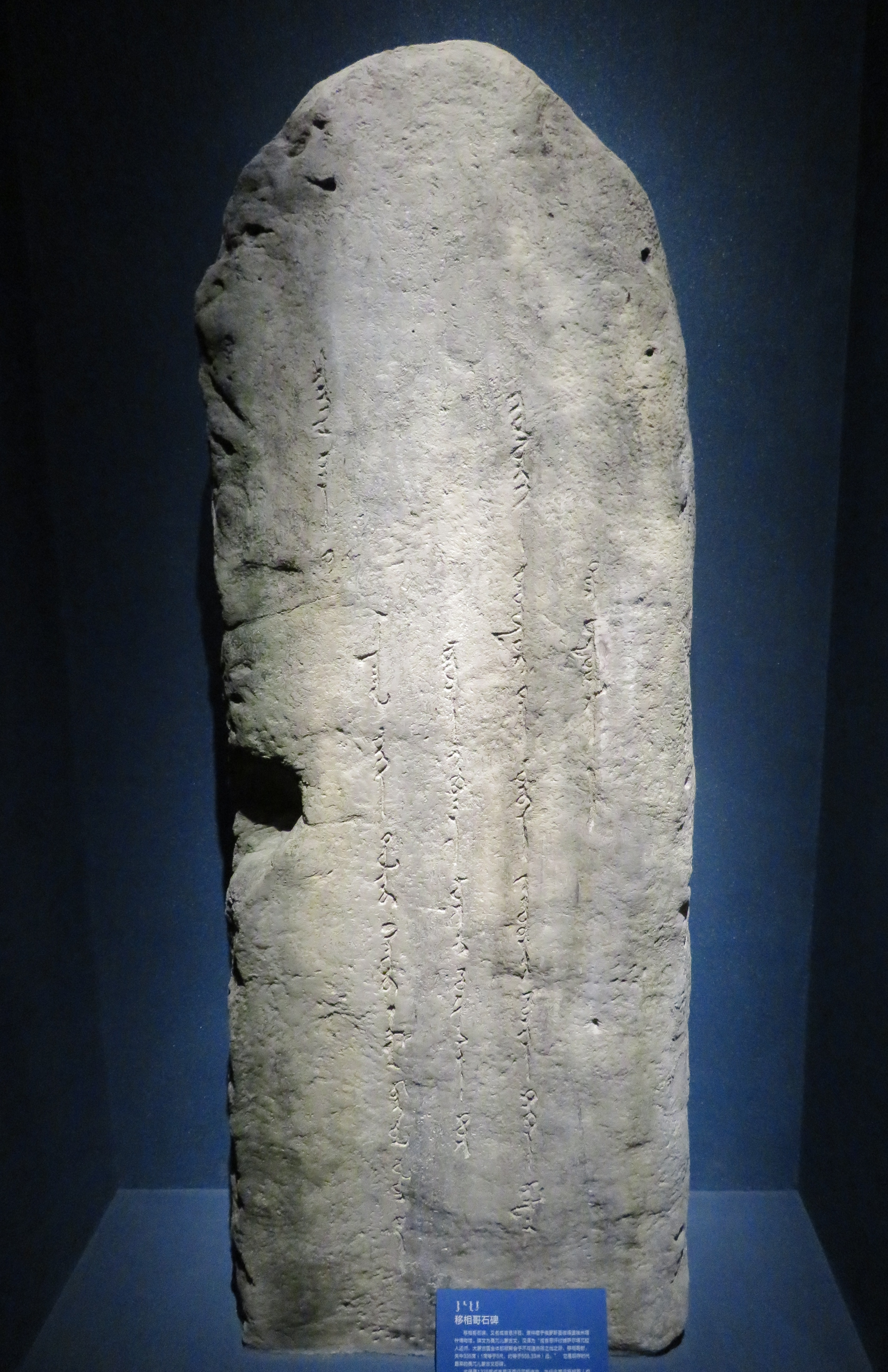
Replica in the Inner Mongolia Museum, Hohhot

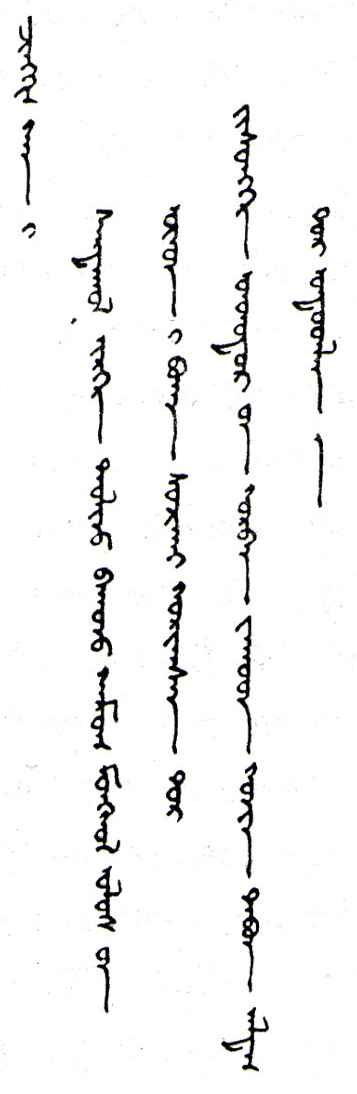
Text of the stele
