= Inscription of Hüis Tolgoi =

Historical inscription of Mongolic language

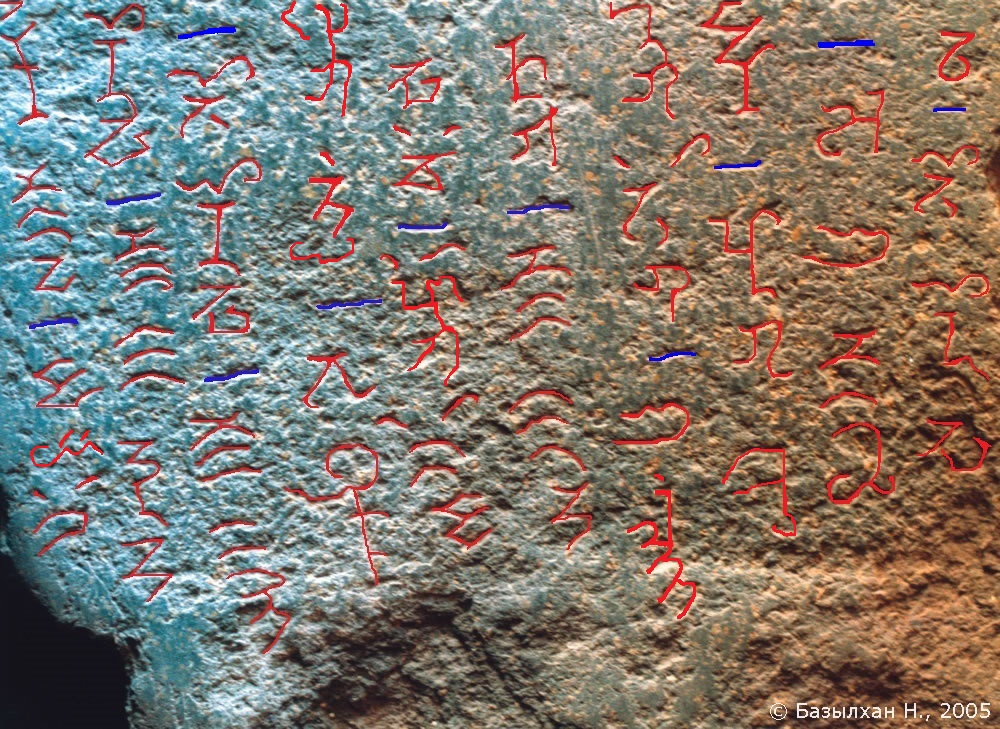
L. Hurtsbaatar restoration of the Inscription of Hüis Tolgoi

The Inscription of Hüis Tolgoi (HT) is a monolingual inscription in a Mongolian language found in Bulgan Province, Mongolia in 1975 by D. Navaan. The 11-line text is written in vertical Brahmi script running right to left with horizontal marks separating words. The language of the inscription was unknown until the joint expedition of Alexander Vovin, Étienne de la Vaissière, Dieter Maue and Mehmet Ölmez to Mongolia in 2014 for closer imaging of the stele. Due to certain morphological peculiarities the language of the inscription was hypothesized to be Mongolic rather than Turkic. The language, "which can be conditionally termed as a variety of Para-Mongolic", is "much closer to the mainstream Mongolic languages, such as Middle Mongolian and modern extant Mongolic languages than to Serbi-Khitan", and is beyond reasonable doubt some form of Mongolic, close to the mainstream Mongolic language.

Dieter Maue, a specialist in Sanskrit and Brahmi, deciphered the Brahmi script of the inscription. It was subsequently analyzed by linguist Alexander Vovin who remarked on the similarity of the HT language to mainstream Mongolic (Middle Mongolian) as opposed to the more southern Khitan language. Mehmet Ölmez elaborated on the details of the expedition while Étienne de la Vaissière provided a historian's perspective. The inscription can be safely dated to between the 5th and 7th centuries, that is in the Rouran and early Turkic period. The text mentions an Anagui (Ańakay, though it is unlikely that this is Yujiulü Anagui, a Rouran khagan), and a Niri qaghan, likely Qaghan Niri since this is the only Qaghan with that name that we know of—though it's unlikely that the inscription was made for him or ordered by him. If the Niri Qaghan mentioned in the inscription corresponds to the only khagan with that name that we know of, the inscription could be dated to the time of his reign (579–603/604). A Bodhi-Sattva is also mentioned, together with the title khagan. This was a Buddhist Bodhisattva, or possibly a Turkic qaɣan from the First Turkic Khaganate. There was an Uighur chief at the time reportedly entitled Bodhisattva (Chinese: 藥羅葛菩薩; pinyin: Yaoluoge Pusa) who, however, never has the title of khagan in Chinese sources, but of xielifa. Further, the lingua franca at the time was Sogdian, and "probably the only trait that distinguished the Uighurs", whose khaganate was established in 744 and like their neighbors were a seminomadic people, "from the Xiongnu, Xianbei and Mongols, was their language", a Turkic one, as opposed to the Mongolic language of the inscription. The text might be historical, but with Buddhist overtones, a religion that was quite important to the Rouran elites and other steppe people.

== Transliteration and tentative translation ==
Alexander Vovin's tentative translation:

Huis Tolgoi original: biti-nar kagan digin sinin bodi-satva torox kagan buda kaganu ukax ukaju xiri anakay -i tin jax bodi bigiy-nar bayi dolu jaju hugbu [] biti jilonar k(a)ranyagun tuwa puror cicire pugtig nelen [] kaganu [] kato-nar dugi-d niri kagan turug kagan uc d(o)ro tayaju xiri hergin bargol palxir []haci higbij tugju ukabar-nar kagan xani julaba tunu tugnya tuwa []xa[] tu[] to[go]gun pugtigci sinin bodisatva torox kagan []l[] [] []iyu uc bitihin [] [] gux tuwa kagan torox kaganun [] pada n(i)ri kagan turug kagan []ijin ubij jalobaj darkad jaya bi []run bitig sag pag [][] j[] [] darkan ba ... ti ba ka	English translation (tentative): of the inscriptions khagan and princes, new bodhisattva born khagan, buddha lord's knowledge knowing country anakay (title) promises the tribe officials stand seven times promises...inscription stones saw tuwa ... to strike...joined...khagan...queens and younger brothers niri khagan turk khagan reason dharma worshipped country erkin collect ... enough those who realized khagan regnal year shone that enough tuwa people...count... ... new bodhisattva born khagan of the inscription...tuwa persons being cut from the khagan who will be reborn as a khagan they followed niri khagan khagan of turks and ...directed ... free men were happy official ... wrote this inscription ...

Dieter Maue's transliteration:

bitig-ña ̤r kagan tigin šıñın bodı-satva töröx
kagan bṳda ̤ kaganu ukax ukaǰuxırı ̣ añakay
...ı ̣1 tı ̣n ǰa ̤x bo ̤dı ̣ bigiy-ñär ba ̤yı ̣do ̤lṳ ǰa ̤ ǰṳ hügbü
b[ı]̣ tı1̣ ǰı1̣o ̤na ̤r k(a)ranyaguñ tṳwa ̤ pṳro ̤rčıč ̣ıra ̤ pügtig ña ̤la ̤n
k[a]ga[nu?] + kato-ñar dügid nırı ̣ kagantürǖg kagan
uč d(o ̤ )ro ̤ ta ̤ya ̤ ǰṳ xırı ̣ härgin bargo[l] pa ̤xır [+]xa ̤ čı ̣ higbiǰ
tügǰü ukabar-ñar kagan xa ̤nı ̣ ǰṳla ̤ ba ̤ tṳnṳ tügnyä tṳwa ̤
xa ̤ [] tṳ[] to[go?]gun pügtigči śıñım bodısatva töröx kagan
ı ̣yṳ uč bitihiñ + + gux tṳwa ̤ -ña ̤r ka
pa ̤da ̤ n<ı1̣ >rı ̣ kagan türüg [ka]ga[n] []ı1̣ ǰıubı1ǰ ǰa ̤ lo ̤ ba ̤ ǰ darkad ǰa ̤yabı
[?]rṳn bitig + säg pag [ + + ] j[] [ ? ] darkan bitiba ̤ kagan töröx kaganun

== See also ==
- Bugut inscription
