= Yujiulü =

Yujiulü is a given surname, generally used by the Yujiulü clan, the ruling family of the Rouran Khaganate. Notable people with the name include:

- Consort Yujiulü (died 452), formally Empress Gong, a consort of Tuoba Huang, a crown prince of the Xianbei-led Northern Wei dynasty of China
- Empress Yujiulü (525-540), formally Empress Dao, an empress of the Xianbei-led Western Wei dynasty of China
- Yujiulü Anagui (died 552), khan of the Rouran (520-552) with the title of Chiliantoubingdoufa Khan
- Yujiulü Anluochen (died 554), khan of the Rouran (553-554)
- Yujiulü Chounu (died 520), khan of the Rouran (508-520) with the title of Douluofubadoufa Khan
- Yujiulü Datan (died 429 AD), khan of the Rouran (414-429) with the title of Mouhanheshenggai Khan
- Yujiulü Dengshuzi (died 555), the last khan of the Rouran
- Yujiulü Doulun (died 492), khan of the Rouran (485-492) with the title of Fumingdun Khan
- Yujiulü Futu (died 508), khan of the Rouran (506-508) with the title of Tuohan Khan
- Yujiulü Hulü (died 414), an early 5th century Aikugai Khan (ruler) of the Rouran
- Yujiulü Kangti (died 553) khan of the Rouran (553)
- Yujiulü Mugulü (born before 277), ancestor of the Rouran tribe and the Yujiulü clan
- Yujiulü Nagais (died 506) khan of the Rouran (492-506) with the title of Houqifudaikezhe Khan
- Yujiulü Shelun (391–410), Khagan of the Rouran (402-410)
- Yujiulü Tiefa (died 553), khan of the Rouran (552-553)
- Yujiulü Tuhezhen, khan of the Rouran (444-464) with the title of Chu Khan
- Yujiulü Wuti, khan of the Rouran (429–444) with the title of Chilian Khan
- Yujiulü Yucheng (died 485) khan of the Rouran (464-485) with the title of Shouluobuzhen Khan
