= Afuzhiluo =

Gaoche ruler

Afuzhiluo (Chinese: 阿伏至羅), also known as Kezhiluo (Chinese: 可至羅), was a Gaoche ruler.

In 487, the Rouran khagan Doulun attacked the Northern Wei dynasty, Afuzhiluo and his younger brother Qiongqi (窮奇) led more than one hundred thousand people in the west of Gaoche. He rebelled against Rouran and moved westward. He established the Kingdom of Gaoche in the northwest of Cheshi and claimed to be waiting. Lou Yule, taking Qiongqi as Houbei (候倍; "prince"). After that, he defeated Rouran many times to make Doulun migrate to the east; he also paid tribute to the Northern Wei and fought Rouran together. Afuzhiluo killed the pro-Rouran King of Gaochang Kan Shougui (闞首歸) and returned home, and made Zhang Mengming (張孟明) the King of Gaochang，and he conquered Shanshan. After that, the clamor of Central Asia attacked Gaoche, Qiongqi was killed and Gaoche declined. The Hephthalites killed Baliyan, the heir of Avozhiluo, and made Chungqi's son Miotu as king, and Gaoche became a vassal of the Hephthalites.

After the death of the Rouran ruler Yucheng in 485 CE, his belligerent son Dulun fought more wars against the Northern Wei.

In 487, there was a disagreement between Afuzhiluo and the person being referred to. As a result, Afuzhiluo, together with his younger cousin Qiongqi, betrayed the person and managed to lead their clans of over 100,000 yurts to escape from the pursuing armies. The armies were led by Dulun and the person's uncle Nagai. In the end, Afuzhiluo and Qiongqi defeated the pursuing armies.

After they settled, he founded a statelet (also known as the A-Fuzhiluo kingdom) under the title of Ulu Beglik (候娄匐勒, based on an interpretation of Shiratori Kurakichi and Pulleyblank). Like the later Qibi and Xueyantuo in 605, the Fufuluo divided their rule between north and south at Dzungaria.

The Fufuluo allied with the Northern Wei in 490 and fought against the Rouran until 541 when they were dispersed by them.

Shortly after the death of Dulun in 492, several important cities on the eastern route were taken by Fufuluo, separating the Rouran from the west. With the elimination of Rouran influence, the Hephthalites, kindred steppe nomads, for the first time extended their domain as far as Karashahr, where Qiongqi was killed and his son Mi'etu (彌俄突) was taken hostage.

After 507, the Hephthalites uninterruptedly sent eighteen embassies with gifts to the Chinese courts (twelve to Northern Wei dynasty, three to Liang dynasty, two to Western Wei dynasty, and one to Northern Zhou dynasty), as opposed to only one in 456. Like Peroz I and his son Kavadh I earlier in the west, the Hephthalites helped Mietu. He returned to his realm and Biliyan (跋利延), the successor of Afuzhiluo, was overthrown by his tribesmen, while shortly paying tribute to the Touba. In 508, Futu attacked the Fufuluo and gained a victory, but was killed by Mietu on his course back. Later in 516, Chounu, son of Futu, defeated Mietu, and in reprisal had him towed to death by a horse. The Fufuluo went for several years into exile under the refuge of the Hephthalites. In 520, Chounu was repulsed by his younger brother Yifu (伊匐) who restored the realm. After his defeat, Chounu returned to the east, where he was killed in a coup in which the ruling clan of Yujiulü was split into two factions. In 521, the Fufuluo penetrated into the Rouran territory, but were finally repulsed by 524. Thereafter, the Fufuluo suffered a series of defeats from Anagui before being annihilated in 541. During the final decade, they helped the Eastern Wei dynasty to fight the Western Wei dynasty in a civil war. After defeat, the nobility surrendered to them.

Afuzhiluo Fufuluo tribe
Regnal titles
Preceded by None, title created	Gaoche ruler 487 - 503	Succeeded by Baliyan (跋利延)

== Family Tree ==
□
□	□
Baliyan
Afuzhiluo	Qiongqi
Mietu	Yifu	Yieju
Bizao	Qubin

== Bibliography ==
=== Sources ===
- History of the Northern Dynasties
