= Consort Yujiulü (Northern Yan) =

Zhaoyi (昭仪)
- Died: after 414
- Spouse: Feng Ba
- Father: Yujiulü Hulü

Zhaoyi (昭仪), also Yujiulü Zhaoyi (郁久闾昭仪) (fl. 414) was the consort of Feng Ba, formally Emperor Wencheng of Yan. She was the daughter of Yujiulü Hulü.

In 411, the khan of Rouran Yujiulü Hulü offered a tribute of 3,000 horses to Feng Ba and requested to marry Feng Ba's daughter Princess Lelang. Feng Ba, believing that an alliance with Rouran would be beneficial to his state, gave Princess Lelang in marriage to Hulü, who was of the Yujiulü clan. Shortly thereafter, in 414, it was Yujiulü Hulü's turn to marry one of his daughters to Feng Ba. Later that year, Yujiulü Hulü was overthrown by his nephew Yujiulü Buluzhen (郁久閭步鹿真), and the coup leaders sent him and his daughter away to Northern Yan. Feng Ba treated Hulü as an honored guest and, as originally planned, took his daughter as a concubine. This was Zhaoyi.

== Sources ==
- Zizhi Tongjian, Volume 116, Jin Ji 38.
