= Princess Murong =

Early 5th century Chinese princess

- Empress of Northern Yan
- Reign: 431–?
- Predecessor: Princess Sun
- Successor: Empress Helian (Northern Wei)
- Spouse: Feng Hong
- Issue: Feng Wangren
- Dynasty: Northern Yan

Princess Murong (慕容王后, personal name unknown) was a princess and queen consort of the Chinese state Northern Yan. Her husband was the last emperor, Feng Hong (Emperor Zhaocheng), of that dynasty.

Presumably, she was from the Murong imperial clan of Northern Yan's predecessor state Later Yan, although her exact lineage is not known. She was not Feng Hong's first wife; when Feng Hong was the Duke of Zhongshan under his brother Feng Ba (Emperor Wencheng), his wife was Duchess Wang, but after he seized the throne in 430, he created Lady Murong princess in 431. He appointed her son Feng Wangren (馮王仁) as crown prince in 432, bypassing Duchess Wang's son Feng Chong (馮崇), the oldest among his sons. Nothing further is known about Princess Murong, including whether she survived Northern Yan's destruction in 436 or her husband's death in 438.

Chinese royalty
Preceded by Princess Sun	Empress of Northern Yan; 430–?	Dynasty ended
Preceded by Princess Sun	Empress of China (Liaoning); 430–?	Succeeded by Empress Helian of Northern Wei
