= 409 =

409 in various calendars
- Gregorian calendar: 409; CDIX
- Ab urbe condita: 1162
- Assyrian calendar: 5159
- Balinese saka calendar: 330–331
- Bengali calendar: −185 – −184
- Berber calendar: 1359
- Buddhist calendar: 953
- Burmese calendar: −229
- Byzantine calendar: 5917–5918
- Chinese calendar: 戊申年 (Earth Monkey); 3106 or 2899 — to — 己酉年 (Earth Rooster); 3107 or 2900
- Coptic calendar: 125–126
- Discordian calendar: 1575
- Ethiopian calendar: 401–402
- Hebrew calendar: 4169–4170
- Hindu calendars
- Vikram Samvat: 465–466
- Shaka Samvat: 330–331
- Kali Yuga: 3509–3510
- Holocene calendar: 10409
- Iranian calendar: 213 BP – 212 BP
- Islamic calendar: 220 BH – 219 BH
- Javanese calendar: 292–293
- Julian calendar: 409; CDIX
- Korean calendar: 2742
- Minguo calendar: 1503 before ROC 民前1503年
- Nanakshahi calendar: −1059
- Seleucid era: 720/721 AG
- Thai solar calendar: 951–952
- Tibetan calendar: ས་ཕོ་སྤྲེ་ལོ་ (male Earth-Monkey); 535 or 154 or −618 — to — ས་མོ་བྱ་ལོ་ (female Earth-Bird); 536 or 155 or −617

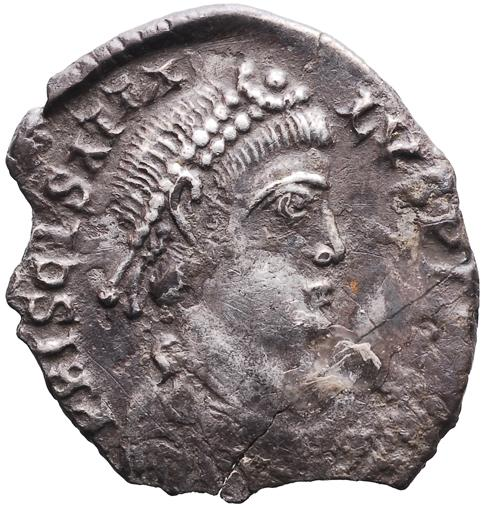
Coin of Priscus Attalus

Year 409 (CDIX) was a common year starting on Friday of the Julian calendar. In the Roman Empire, it was known as the Year of the Consulship of Honorius and Theodosius (or, less frequently, year 1162 Ab urbe condita). The denomination 409 for this year has been used since the early medieval period, when the Anno Domini calendar era became the prevalent method in Europe for naming years. It was the 409th year of the Common Era (CE) and Anno Domini (AD) designations, the 409th year of the 1st millennium, the 9th year of the 10th century, and the 10th and last year of the 400s decade.

== Events ==
=== By place ===
==== Roman Empire ====
- Roman Civil war of 407–415:
  - Spring – Gerontius, Roman general (magister militum), who had been a partisan of Constantine III, revolts in Hispania. He elevates Maximus, his domesticus, as emperor.
  - October 13 – The Vandals, led by King Gunderic, cross the Pyrenees into the Iberian Peninsula. They receive land from the Romans, as foederati, in Baetica (Southern Spain). The Alans occupy lands in Lusitania and the Suebi control parts of Gallaecia.
  - The Visigothic king Alaric I lays siege to Rome a second time, bringing the inhabitants close to starvation. Emperor Honorius, safe in inaccessible Ravenna, refuses to negotiate for peace, despite repeated offers from Alaric, who then comes to terms with the Senate and sets up a rival emperor, Priscus Attalus, prefect (praefectus urbi) of the city.
  - Honorius agrees that sons of prominent families at court in Ravenna be sent beyond the Danube as hostages; in return, later he calls up ten thousand Hun mercenaries.
  - Following the invasions by the Vandals, Alans, and Suebi in 409, chroniclers report severe disruption to food supplies in Hispania and nearby regions, leading to famine and hardship.
  - Bacaudic Rebellion: Peasants in Armorica, northwestern Gallia launch a revolt. The unrest continues until 417.

==== Asia ====
- Mingyuan, age 17, succeeds Daowu as emperor of the Chinese Northern Wei (one of the Northern dynasties).
- Battle of Linqu: Southern Yan is defeated by Eastern Jin.

== Births ==
- Daniel the Stylite, Christian saint (approximate date)
- Liu Yikang, prince of the Liu Song Dynasty (d. 451)

== Deaths ==
- Didymus and Verinianus, cousins of emperor Honorius.
- Daowu, emperor of the Northern Wei (b. 371)
- Gao Yun, emperor of the Northern Yan
- Li of Yan, empress, wife of Gao Yun (who died the same year)
- Mallius Theodorus, Roman consul (approximate date)
- Serena, noblewoman and wife of Stilicho
