= 409th =

409th may refer to:

== Soviet Union ==
- 409th Rifle Division, 1941–1945

== United Kingdom ==
- 409th Coast Regiment, Royal Artillery or 1st Cornwall (Duke of Cornwall's) Artillery Volunteers
- 409th (Suffolk) Heavy Anti-Aircraft Battery, Royal Artillery or 1st Suffolk Artillery Volunteer Corps

== United States ==
- 409th Air Expeditionary Operations Group, provisional United States Air Force unit assigned to Air Mobility Command
- 409th Bombardment Squadron or 909th Air Refueling Squadron (909 ARS), part of the 18th Wing at Kadena Air Base, Japan
- 409th Fighter Squadron or 194th Fighter Squadron, aviation unit of the California Air National Guard
- 409th Support Brigade (United States), support brigade of the United States Army
- 409th Bomb Squadron, 93rd Bomb Group, 8th Air Force, United States Army Air Force, B-24 Liberators, Flying Pandas, Hardwick, England, World War II European Theater

== See also ==
- 409 (number)
- 409, the year 409 (CDIX) of the Julian calendar
- 409 BC
