= Princess Xihai =

5th-century Rouran princess

Princess Xihai (西海公主)
- Born: Early 5th century
- Died: after 434
- Spouse: Qilian Khan
- Dynasty: Northern Wei
- Father: Member of the imperial house of Northern Wei

Princess Xihai (Chinese: 西海公主) (fl. 434) was a consort of the Qilian Khan of the Rouran Khaganate. She was born into the imperial clan of the Northern Wei, and was a cousin or sister of the Emperor Taiwu.

== Biography ==
She was married to the Rouran Khan Wuti, son of Khan Datan, of the royal Yujiulü clan. In the fourth year of Shenjia (神䴥) (431 CE), Wuti sent an envoy to the Northern Wei dynasty. In February of the third year of Yanhe (延和) (434), Emperor Taiwu gave Princess Xihai in marriage to Wuti, and took in turn Wuti's sister Lu Zuo Zhaoyi (闾左昭仪), who would bear him Tuoba Yu, as his wife.

== In popular culture ==
She was played by actress Wang Ou in the 2013 TV series The Story of Mulan.

== Sources ==
- "Biography No. 91". Book of Wei. 554.
