= List of Nirvana in Fire episodes =

Nirvana in Fire title card

This is a list of Nirvana in Fire episodes. The series originally aired in 2 episodes daily on Beijing TV and Dragon TV, Monday through Sunday from 19:30 to 21:00. It premiered on September 19, 2015, and aired its finale on October 15, 2015. Nirvana in Fire tells the story of Lin Shu, or his alias Mei Changsu, who stirs the political pot in Jin Ling, with an ultimate goal to bring justice to his family and 70,000 Chiyan soldiers who were labeled traitors twelve years before.

Note: For viewer ratings, the number on top is the audience share on Dragon TV, while the number in the bottom is of Beijing TV.

== Episodes ==
=== Ep 1-10 ===
No. in season	Title	Original release date	Ratings
1	"Episode 1"	September 19, 2015	1.38; 1.64
On returning to the Liang Empire from a mission to Northern Yan, Minister Xu meets Prince Yu, and tells him that a pouch containing the name of a gifted scholar from Langya Hall will be the key for Prince Yu to become king. He goes to Langya Hall for the pouch, with Prince Xian's people immediately following him, and they both receive a pouch containing the name: Mei Changsu, leader of the Jiang Zuo Alliance and first in Langya Hall's list of gifted scholars. Both princes vow to get Mei on their side. However, instead of accepting the princes' invitations to be a strategist, Mei Changsu decides to enter the capital through an invitation by two young masters, Xiao Jingrui, and his friend Yan Yujin. While the princes fervently search for him, he settles in Jingrui's father, Marquise Ning Xie Yu's manor. Meanwhile, the emperor arranges a martial arts competition and a written exam to help Princess Mu Nihuang find a husband. Her friend, Xia Dong, is ordered to investigate the Duke of Qing, who is suspected of killing and illegally taking land in Bingzhou.
2	"Episode 2"	September 19, 2015	1.38; 1.64
At the Ning mansion, Meng Zhi notices and fights Fei Liu, Mei Changsu's bodyguard. When Mei steps in to stop the conflict, the general states that Mei must be a very powerful individual to have a strong bodyguard. Xie Yu, a Crown Prince Xian supporter and his son Xie Bi, a Prince Yu supporter, both realize that their guest is Mei Changsu, and quickly notify their masters. Prince Jing returns to the capital after making a military report. As the competition commences, Jingrui, Yujin, Mei Changsu and Fei Liu arrive, catching the attention of Prince Xian and Prince Yu. They both take the opportunity to gain his support, but are interrupted when the Grand Empress Dowager summons the young masters. At the palace, Princess Nihuang notices Mei Changsu, and becomes suspicious of him when the Grand Empress Dowager calls him "Xiao Shu", as well as thinking Mei and the princess were engaged. She later stops him and invites him to take a walk with her.
3	"Episode 3"	September 20, 2015	1.65; 1.67
During their walk, Nihuang and Mei Changsu see Prince Jing trying to rescue a servant boy named Tingshen, who was about to be whipped to death. Mei offers to free the boy for Prince Jing. As he walks back to the Ning manor, he encounters Meng Zhi, who recognizes him and offers to help Mei in his plans. He later secretly visits Mei, and asks what happened at the battle in Meiling, but Mei promises to tell him later. Mu Qing, Nihuang's younger brother, asks Mei to help him form a plan to keep his sister from marrying Baili Qi, a strong but rather unattractive competitor for Northern Yan. Meanwhile, the princess recommends Mei to be the writer for the written exam, which allows him to attend the banquet where the top ten competitors are invited.
4	"Episode 4"	September 20, 2015	1.65; 1.67
At the banquet, Mei Changsu asks the Emperor to allow him to use three servant children, including Tingshen, to battle competitor, Baili Qi. The Emperor agrees, as he did not want Mu Nihuang to be married to the Northern Yan. Meanwhile, Concubine Jing, Prince Jing's mother, meets Consort Hui, and offers to go with her to the deceased Empress Dowager palace to pay their respects to her. On their way back, they overhear a servant talking about Qing Si Rao, a strong concoction that knocks people out of consciousness. Later, Concubine Jing notifies Grand Princess Liyang about the wine and asks her to help its potential victim: Princess Nihuang. While training the three children, Mei Changsu meets Prince Jing and tells him that he will help him become the heir to the throne; Prince Jing agrees to form an alliance with him. That night, Liyang seeks help from Mei, asking him to notify the princess about the wine for her.
5	"Episode 5"	September 21, 2015	1.48; 1.64
The three children compete with Baili Qi, and eventually win. After the match, Princess Nihuang conveys her suspicions to Mei Changsu, who informs her that the match was fixed; Baili Qi is actually a member of the Jiang Zuo Alliance, and the events leading up to the match were arranged in order to secure Tingshen's freedom. Mei then warns Nihuang to be careful of what she eats or drinks when she is summoned by the Empress. However, he soon realizes that the Empress is not the one behind the act, but Noble Consort Yue. He quickly arranges for Meng Zhi to notify Prince Jing to save Nihuang. Prince Jing arrives at Zhaoren Palace to save the unconscious princess. The Empress soon arrives to the palace as well, and reports to the Emperor of the incident. The Emperor finds Noble Consort Yue guilty, demotes her to concubine, and grounds her son.
6	"Episode 6"	September 21, 2015	1.48; 1.64
The emperor becomes suspicious of Prince Jing on how he knew that the princess was in danger. Before he can answer, Prince Yu comes and tells the emperor that it was he who told Prince Jing to save Nihuang, taking all the credit. Princess Nihuang realizes that it was Meng Zhi who told Prince Jing; Meng Zhi admits that he was carrying out Mei Changsu's plan. After that, Prince Jing visits Mei and tells him his rules: Mei cannot use certain people, especially the innocent, in his future plans. Meanwhile, Zhuo Qingyao tells Xie Yu about Xia Dong's progress in the Duke of Qing's case, including her discovery that Xie Yu protected the case's plaintiffs from Prince Yu's people. During a morning walk, Jingrui and Yujin meet the injured Xia Dong and helps her fight off assassins.
7	"Episode 7"	September 22, 2015	1.56; 1.52
Xia Dong, Jingrui, and Yujin travel back into the capital. Xie Bi tells Jingrui that their father told him to stop serving Prince Yu, causing Xingrui to realize that the Marquise was a Crown Prince Xian supporter. Xia Dong arrives at Xie Yu's manor to meet Mei Changsu. After her visit, she also tells an eavesdropping Xie Yu that she knows it was he who sent the assassins against her, but promises to keep it a secret, as Xie Yu brought back her husband's, Nie Feng's, body twelve years ago. Knowing full well that Prince Yu and Prince Xian would mess with Duke Qing's case to make it favor themselves, the emperor asks Prince Jing to supervise the case. Meanwhile, Mei Changsu and the two young masters stumble upon female corpses in a dilapidated manor, and reports it, while Xie Yu asks Zhuo Dingfeng to get rid of Mei Changsu.
8	"Episode 8"	September 22, 2015	1.56; 1.52
Mei Changsu is attacked by Zhuo Dingfeng and his son, but are quickly fought off by Fei Liu. The next morning, Crown Prince Xian receives news from the Minister of Revenue, Lou Zhijing, that he had may be implicated as he was responsible for some of the corpses. Prince Xian and Xie Yu then try to find a way to save the minister, who was a crown prince supporter. As for Mei Changsu, he buys a house that has a back wall that connects to Prince Jing's manor, making it possible for the two to secretly meet and plan. That night, Qin Banruo persuades the judge of the corpses case to give it to the Ministry of Justice, a department controlled by Prince Yu.
9	"Episode 9"	September 23, 2015	1.98; 1.73
After Mei Changsu moves into his new house, Prince Yu visits and asks him to help him save Duke Qing. However, Mei advises him to drop the Duke, and instead support Prince Jing. After much persuasion, Prince Yu agrees. The next day, Mei goes to see Prince Jing to help him prepare for the case as well as the future, such as keeping capable and neutral officials as acquaintances. Prince Yu and Prince Xian argue against each other about who would replace Lou Zhijing as Minister of Revenue. After they were dismissed, the Emperor hears about Shen Zhui, a third-rank official who is currently running the department in Lou's absence.
10	"Episode 10"	September 23, 2015	1.98; 1.73
The Emperor of Liang appoints Shen Zhui as the new Minister of Revenue, as he is not part of the fights for the throne. Prince Jing chooses neutral officials in three departments to oversee his case. After the fall of both Duke Qing and Lou Zhijing is set in stone, Mei Changsu decides to attack Prince Yu's Ministry of Personnel next. He notifies Gong Yu, and secretly arranges for He Wenxin to accidentally murder the son of a Crown Prince supporter, causing Wenxin's father, He Jingzhong, the Minister of Personnel, to beg Prince Yu to save him from being sentenced to death. Prince Jing turns in his finished report on Duke Qing's case, but Prince Yu rides on his achievement and is rewarded.

=== Ep 11-20 ===
No. in season	Title	Original release date	Ratings
11	"Episode 11"	September 24, 2015	2.11; 1.5
Although it is revealed that Prince Ji, the Emperor's little brother, is a witness of the murder case, Prince Yu is determined to save He Wenxin's life for He Jingzhong's sake. Xie Yu and Crown Prince Xian has Minister Chen Yuan Zhi, the minister of Rites, convince the emperor to reinstate Concubine Yue to her original position, as her demotion apparently causes problems with the New Year ceremony protocols. The emperor acquiesces, and prepares to reinstate her. However, Mei Changsu finds a flaw in the minister's argument, and arranges for Prince Yu to hold a court debate. Mei then sends Mu Qing out to retrieve Master Zhou, a past minister of Rites, who helps Yu win the debate. Prince Jing finally tells his mother that he would join the fight for the crown.
12	"Episode 12"	September 24, 2015	2.11; 1.5
Mei Changsu meets Master Zhou, and the two talk about Official Li, a past imperial tutor who taught Lin Shu. After Master Zhou leaves, Princess Nihuang confronts Mei, and correctly deduces that Mei is Lin Shu, her past fiance, which brings her great joy. Meanwhile, Shen Zhui meets Prince Jing in the streets of the capital, and together they investigate the canal ports. Shen Zhui explains to the prince that the ship's cargo should not weigh as much as it's supposed to, causing him to believe that the ship is smuggling gunpowder. Tong Lu investigates and discovers an illegal fireworks factory that is run by the Crown Prince; Mei has the information given to Shen Zhui. Coincidentally, the Empress becomes ill, but as it is not life threatening, Mei suspects someone is behind the illness.
13	"Episode 13"	September 25, 2015	2.0; 1.92
Since Minister He became sickly after hearing his son would be executed, Prince Yu decides to try to save his son. Meanwhile, Yujin and Jingrui come to visit Mei Changsu. Yujin brings in tangerines, but when Fei Liu turns them down, Mei suspects that the fruit was part of a shipment of smuggled gunpowder. When Prince Jing goes to visit his mother, Concubine Jing tells him about the herb that caused the Empress' illness; Prince Jing later relays the information to Mei. Mei realizes that it is Marquise Yan Que who smuggled the gunpowder, so that he can use it to kill the Emperor. It was also he who harmlessly poisoned his sister, the Empress, so that she would not be present when the gunpowder is set off. However, Mei successfully persuades him not to carry out the deed.
14	"Episode 14"	September 25, 2015	2.0; 1.92
Mei Changsu promises the Marquise that he would keep the incident a secret, because he wanted to save people with devotion and loyalty like Yan Que. To save Minister He's son, Prince Yu captures a tramp to be executed in He Wenxin's steed. However, Mei leaked the incident to Xie Yu, who used the opportunity take down both Minister He and the Minister of Justice, Qimin. On New Year's night, when the Emperor sends out twelve teams to present the royal dishes for the twelve vassal families, one of the teams were murdered overnight, causing Meng Zhi to be punished. The murder was instrumented by Xie Yu, so that he can slowly erode the Emperor's trust in Meng Zhi; he and Zhuo Dingfeng invite martial arts experts to the capital to continue their plans.
15	"Episode 15"	September 26, 2015	2.07; 1.82
The Emperor has Xuanjing Bureau investigate the murder of the team. Xiao Jingrui becomes suspicious of his brother-in-law Qingyao, thinking that he must be working for his father. Xie Yu tells Qingyao and Dingfeng to get rid of Shen Zhui, claiming that the minister is accusing the Crown Prince for being involved in an illegal gunpowder factory. Meanwhile, Jingrui invites Mei Changsu to his birthday party; after they leave, Mei orders Li Gang to have someone challenge the martial arts experts sent by Zhuo Dingfeng and injure them enough so that they will be useless to Xie Yu.
16	"Episode 16"	September 26, 2015	2.07; 1.82
Zhen Ping successfully injures all nine martial arts experts sent by Zhuo Dingfeng, putting Xie Yu's plan to weaken the Imperial guards and Meng Zhi on hold. After visiting General Nie Feng's grave with Xia Dong, Mei Changsu orders Zhen Ping to protect Shen Zhui. While following Qingyao, Jingrui finds his brother-in-law and Zhuo Dingfeng about to assassinate Shen Zhui, and intercepts just in time. During the Lantern Festival, Jingrui, Yujin, and Mei Changsu go to Miaoyin Court and invite Gong Yu to Jingrui's birthday party. At the same time, Zhuo Dingfeng and Qingyao set out to kill Shen Zhui once more, but failed again, causing Xie Yu to abandon his plan to kill Shen Zhui. Mei then advises Prince Yu to help Shen Zhui in the gunpowder factory case.
17	"Episode 17"	September 27, 2015	1.99; 1.43
Qin Banruo advises Prince Yu to make the gunpowder case a bigger issue to give a bigger blow at the Crown Prince. Before the factory is closed down, Prince Yu explodes the building, causing many civilian deaths and injuries. Prince Jing arrives with his troops to aid the people; Mei arranges the prince to not follow protocol so that people would see Prince Jing's good deeds. After hearing Shen Zhui's testimony, the Emperor permanently grounds the Crown Prince. Prince Xian also fails to get Prince Jing punished, as many officials in the court support him, instead of Xian's Ministry of Defense. Mei invites guests, to his newly renovated home, and devises a game, where the guests must find a musical score in the house. Qin Banruo finds his secret room.
18	"Episode 18"	September 27, 2015	1.99; 1.43
Qin Banruo explores the secret room, but accidentally breaks Fei Liu's toys, causing her whereabouts known. After the guests leave, Mei Changsu asks Princess Nihuang and Meng Zhi not to reveal his identity to Prince Jing, as it may ruin future plans. Prince Jing recommends Cai Quan to be the new minister of justice. Meanwhile, news spread that Southern Chu envoys are to arrive at the capital to seek a marriage alliance. Meng Zhi visits Prince Jing's manor, and finds the secret passage in the building. The Emperor goes to visit Concubine Jing.
19	"Episode 19"	September 28, 2015	1.82; 1.68
After finding the secret passage, Meng Zhi expresses his loyalty to Prince Jing and offers to help him in his fight for the throne. After his visit to Concubine Jing, the Emperor promotes her to Consort rank. The Emperor also sends Princess Nihuang back to protect the Da Liang border from the Southern Chu. That night Gong Yu attempts to assassinate Xie Yu, but was then injured and "saved" by Qin Banruo. Banruo later tells Prince Yu information Gong Yu gave to her; Prince Yu later asks Mei how he can use the information to his advantage. Jingrui invites Xia Dong to his birthday party and Gong Yu is picked up by Yujin to go to the party.
20	"Episode 20"	September 28, 2015	1.82; 1.68
Prince Yu prepares to enact his plan to take down Xie Yu. That night at Jingrui's birthday party, Southern Chu's prince, princess, and official Yue Xiuze come uninvited, with Yue wanting to duel with Zhuo Dingfeng. Wary that a showcase of his skills would be evidence for New Years murder case, Zhuo purposely injured himself. However, the Chu princess, Yuwen Nian, asks Jingrui to go to Southern Chu with her, as he is her brother. Xiao Jingrui's birth is exposed, causing Gong Yu to burst out laughing. She reveals to the guests that Xie Yu killed Zhuo's family's son, mistaking as the Liyang's child with the Chu envoy. Xie Yu attempts to kill the guests with his personal guards.

=== Ep 21-30 ===
No. in season	Title	Original release date	Ratings
21	"Episode 21"	September 29, 2015	1.97; 2.26
Xie Yu commands the city guard barracks to guard the mansion, so that Prince Yu's army cannot easily save the guests. The Zhuo family, Jingrui, Princess Yuwen Nian, Yujin, Mei Changsu, Fei Liu, Meng Zhi, Xia Dong, Yue Xiuze and Gong Yu escape through a trap door and flee to the manors back gardens. Right when Xie Yu commands the guard barracks to release arrows at the guests, Liyang arrives to stop Xie Yu and let Prince Yu's army into the manor. When the manor is seized, Liyang makes Prince Yu swear that he must never implicate the Zhuo family.
22	"Episode 22"	September 29, 2015	1.97; 2.26
Grand Princess Liyang apologizes to the Zhuo family and confronts Xie Yu. Although they profess their love for one another, Xie Yu is unwilling to commit suicide to save the Xie family's reputation. The next day, the daughter of the Xie Family, Xie Qi dies from childbirth. After Xie Yu's imprisonment, Xia Jiang, director of the Xuanjing Bureau, comes back to the capital and reprimands Xia Dong for being entangled in Xie Yu's conflict with the Zhuo's. Xia Jiang then asks the Emperor to let him interrogate Xie Yu, as he suspected that the way in which the crime was revealed was someone else's doing. At the prison cells, Xia makes a deal with Xie Yu: he would save Xie's life if he would keep Xia Jiang's secrets. Prince Yu visits Mei as he could not believe his father has let Xie Yu off without the death sentence, and believes that it is Xia Jiang's doing.
23	"Episode 23"	September 30, 2015	1.99; 2.21
To verify the deal between Xia Jiang and Xie Yu, Prince Yu arranges a meeting between Xie Yu and Mei Changsu. Meanwhile, Mei has Fei Liu send Xia Dong a letter, asking her and Prince Jing to meet at the prison where Xie Yu is held. While interrogating Xie Yu, Mei receives information about why Xie Yu killed a certain man, Lin Congxin: Lin Congxin made a counterfeit letter written apparently by general Nie Feng, and Xia Jiang used the letter as evidence that the Chiyan army are planning to rebel. Xie Yu ambushed the unwitting general, making it seem that it was General Lin Xie of the Chiyan army who killed him. The truth is overheard by Xia Dong and Prince Jing. Prince Jing later visits Mei; he states he wants to re-investigate the Chiyan case.
24	"Episode 24"	September 30, 2015	1.99; 2.21
Although Mei Changsu advises Prince Jing to not look into the Chiyan case any further, he finally acquiesces. Just then, they are notified of the Grand Empress Dowager's death, which causes great sadness in Mei. Princess Nihuang visits him, and the two reminisce about their past. Xie Yu is sent to exile, but before he goes, Princess Liyang and his family see him off. Liyang has him write a confession for Mei, so Xia Jiang cannot get rid of him so easily. The Emperor visits Consort Jing and her son for her birthday.
25	"Episode 25"	October 1, 2015	1.97; 2.41
The Emperor chooses Prince Jing to be the new leader the Capitol Patrols as well as allow him to see his mother whenever he wants to. Sir Shisan informs Mei that he has uprooted over half of informants in Qin Banruo's network, although Mei worries that there are still more that are not under her control. When Prince Yu suddenly arrives at the residence to talk to Mei about Prince Jing's sudden rise to power, the strategist advises him to hold back on his power and wait for the Emperor's suspicions subside. Banruo goes out to recruit Jun Niang. After a visit with Mei, Prince Jing borrows a travelogue book with Mei's annotations in it.
26	"Episode 26"	October 1, 2015	1.97; 2.41
Grand Princess Liyang allows Princess Nian to take Xiao Jingrui to Southern Chu, and Mei Changsu sees him off. Banruo plans to have Jun Niang seduce Tong Lu to get information on Mei Changsu's network. Mei arranges for Prince Jing to give the emperor a bow for his birthday. The Emperor later becomes sick. Prince Jing lets his mother borrow Mei's travelogue book. Jun Niang acts as a damsel in distress to grab Tong Lu's attention.
27	"Episode 27"	October 2, 2015	2.11; 2.5
After being bedridden for a few days, the Emperor decides to go on a walk and visit Crown Prince Xian. However, the emperor catches his son dancing and drinking, although it is not allowed during the mourning period. He is angered and asks Meng Zhi to seal the Eastern Palace, but as it was only verbal decree, Meng cannot fend off the people who doubt his actions. However, Mei tells him to stop trying to get the decree, or the emperor would be suspicious the Meng Zhi is a Prince Yu's supporter. Prince Yu decides to ride on the opportunity to try to bring Prince Xian to rock bottom. Consort Jing gives the travelogue back to her son.
28	"Episode 28"	October 2, 2015	2.11; 2.5
Consort Jing tells her son to trust Mei Changsu. After learning that Consort Jing has seen his book, Mei is worried that she may have found out about his secret identity. Meanwhile, Prince Jing is promoted to a noble prince with five pearls (ranking system), causing Prince Yu to be furious and as well as compete with Prince Jing like he did before with Prince Xian. Shen Zhui meets Prince Jing and pleads to him to help with the relief for drought victims in five states. However, Prince Yu is given the task instead.
29	"Episode 29"	October 3, 2015	2.08; 2.1
Mei Changsu uses the case of one of the five state's envoys sending gifts to Prince Yu to give Prince Jing his chance to be in charge of the disaster relief. Prince Yu is hit hard by his failure, but after much persuasion by Qin Banruo, he finally picks himself back up to try and fight back at Prince Jing. They plan to reopen the Chiyan case, with the help of Xia Jiang, to probe into Prince Jing's weakness. Mei Changsu realizes that Consort Jing has realized his identity. He later goes to the Yan household to meet Marquise Yan.
30	"Episode 30"	October 3, 2015	2.08; 2.1
Mei Changsu asks Marquise Yan to help Prince Jing in his fight for the crown; he later agrees. Zhen Ping finds Tong Lu acting suspiciously whenever he comes to visit Mei. Xia Jiang and Prince Yu secretly meet and devise a plan to catch Prince Jing off guard and make him lose favor. The Emperor reminisce about Consort Chen, who killed herself when her son committed suicide as a result of the Chiyan case. He also announces that he will have to leave the palace for three days to guard Grand Empress Dowager's tomb with Meng Zhi.

=== Ep 31-40 ===
No. in season	Title	Original release date	Ratings
31	"Episode 31"	October 4, 2015	2.47; 2.15
The Xuan Jing Bureau ambush and capture Wei Zheng. Prince Yu asks the Empress to inspect Consort Jing's medicine cabinet and say that one of her herbs can be poisonous to the Emperor. The plan is set in motion, causing Consort Jing to be interrogated as well as have her servants locked up. However, Prince Yu lets out a servant named Xiao Xin so she may try to send a message to the emperor for help. However, during the journey, a man claiming to have been sent by Mei Changsu appears, subdues the general who accompanied her, and sends her back into the palace. Later, Wei Zheng's companions race to the Su Residence to tell the chief that their friend had been captured. Meanwhile, Tong Lu is captured by Banruo, who finds out that it is Miao Yin Court and Sir Shisan who uprooted her informants.
32	"Episode 32"	October 4, 2015	2.47; 2.15
The Emperor returns from his trip and reprimands the Empress for her actions toward Consort Jing. He later secretly asks Consort Jing to do something for him. Jiang Zuo followers try to rescue Wei Zheng, but fail to do so; Xia Jiang resolves to keep Wei Zheng as bait. When Prince Jing arrives back to the capital, Xia Jiang and Prince Yu bring up Wei Zheng, causing Prince Jing to have a conflict with his father. After the Emperor lets him go, he visits his mother.
33	"Episode 33"	October 5, 2015	2.24; 2.45
When he visited his mother, Xiao Xin tells him about the details of Consort Jing's incident with the medicine. He is angered and thinks that Mei Changsu did not care about his mother's safety as well as Wei Zheng, causing him to sever his trust in the strategist. To stop him from doing anything rash, Mei goes to the Jing manor to explain the story more clearly to the prince. Prince Jing is adamant that he save Wei Zheng, which is what Mei is hesitant to do. Nevertheless, he acquiesces, enlisting Xia Dong and Yaoweng warriors for his plan.
34	"Episode 34"	October 5, 2015	2.24; 2.45
After the rescue of Wei Zheng is planned, the Crown Prince is formally demoted to Prince Xian, while Prince Jing is promoted to a seven pearl noble prince. On New Year's, an imperial ornament is stolen. The Emperor gives the task to investigate to Prince Jing, who tightens security in the city as well as station troops near Xuan Jing Bureau. Mei Changsu visits Marquise Yan, as he is part of the plan; Yan Que wholeheartedly agrees to help. Meanwhile, Xiao Xin discovers a funeral plaque for Consort Chen in Consort Jing's private chambers, and goes to Zhenyang Palace to notify the Empress.
35	"Episode 35"	October 6, 2015	2.55; 2.69
While the Yaoweng Valley warriors plan their rescue mission, Mei instructs Yujin to take Prince Ji to Gongyu's place. Prince Yu is notified of Consort Jing's secret memorial plaque. Xia Jiang receives a personal letter from Yan Que, who claims he has information on Xia Jiang's wife and son's whereabouts. He meets Yan Que, who uses the topic to distract Xia Jiang into leaving the capital. While Xia Jiang is away, the warriors carry out a rescue mission, but quickly retreat.
36	"Episode 36"	October 6, 2015	2.55; 2.69
Xia Jiang explains his plan to Marquise Yan. However, upon returning to Jinling, he finds no signs of any rescue mission. Xia quickly goes to check on the true place he hid Wei Zheng, but the rebels follow them, giving them the opportunity to rescue the prisoner. Meanwhile, Prince Ji, who is at Gongyu's place, spots Xia Dong with Wei Zheng. After Wei is rescued, Xia Jiang reports the matter to the Emperor, with him and Prince Yu accusing Prince Jing of the incident. The Emperor angrily summons Prince Jing. At that moment, Consort Jing's incident is announced, prompting him to go see what is wrong.
37	"Episode 37"	October 7, 2015	2.35; 2.73
Consort Jing's crime of erecting a memorial plaque for Consort Chen was actually a request by the Emperor. Nevertheless, to keep the fact hidden, he punishes Consort Jing lightly and quickly returns to his palace to listen to Xia Jiang, Prince Yu, and Prince Jing. After countless arguments, Xia Jiang requests to interrogate Mei Changsu for the case, much to Prince Jing's displeasure. After knowing Xiao Xin is a spy, Consort Jing offers to let her go, with a condition that she reveal the whole setup to Prince Jing.
38	"Episode 38"	October 7, 2015	2.35; 2.73
While interrogating Mei Changsu, Xia Jiang forces down a Wujin poison pill, so that he would do his bidding. Xia Dong also sees his master do the deed and questions Xia Jiang's actions. Prince Ji tells the Emperor about seeing Xia Dong with Wei Zheng on the day of his capture, causing him to suspect the Xuan Jing Bureau; the Emperor asks Meng Zhi to covertly bring Xia Dong in for questioning. Xia Dong confesses that she kidnapped Wei Zheng.
39	"Episode 39"	October 8, 2015	2.99; 1.91
After Xia Dong confesses, the Emperor believes that Xuan Jing Bureau and Xia Jiang used the prisoner kidnapping incident to deliberately frame Prince Jing. He orders Meng Zhi to seize the bureau and arrest Xia Jiang. Xia Jiang orders his disciple to kill Mei Changsu, but is fought off by Fei Liu, letting Mei escape the bureau. Shen Zhui and Cai Quan report to the Emperor that Prince Yu's brother-in-law was responsible of the explosion of the illegal firework factory. Although angered from Prince Yu's actions, the Emperor does not hold a trial to save the royal family's reputation.
40	"Episode 40"	October 8, 2015	2.99; 1.91
Prince Yu becomes depressed after his explosion plan backfired, while Shen Zhui and Cai Quan discuss the corruptness of the royal court. When Prince Jing visits his mother, Consort Jing has Xiao Xin tell him about the set up. The prince feels guilty for mistrusting Mei, as the maid's confession proved Mei's innocence. Xia Dong tells Meng Zhi about the Wujin pill, causing Meng and Prince Jing to frantically search for the antidote to save Mei. Qin Banruo, disguised as a food deliverer, gets into contact with Xia Jiang to hatch a plan to help Prince Yu.

=== Ep 41-50 ===
No. in season	Title	Original release date	Ratings
41	"Episode 41"	October 9, 2015	2.9; 2.79
Meng Zhi orders Xia Jiang to write a second confession to the Emperor, as his majesty did not believe in his last one. He also states that his two disciples have died, and the Wujin poison has been cured. Prince Yu is demoted to a two-pearl noble prince, while Noble Consort Yue's first rank status is given to Consort Jing. Mei Changsu helps Prince Jing pick neutral ministers and officials. Prince Jing meets Mu Qing and attempts to ask if Wei Zheng is in Mu Manor, but Mu Qing quickly changes the subject and leaves. Qin Banruo secretly meets Xia Jiang again; he asks her to open a silk pouch that Princess Xuanji left to Banruo.
42	"Episode 42"	October 9, 2015	2.9; 2.79
Banruo and Xia Jiang open the pouch and find a letter written to Prince Yu, by his mother, Hua Princess Linglong. Banruo tells the prince of her discovery, making him believe that the Emperor wrongfully killed his mother as well as purposely stopped him from being the Crown Prince. Mei Changsu tells Mu Qing to release Wei Zheng for him, so that the ex-Chiyan general may talk to Prince Jing about the battle in Meiling 13 years before. Prince Jing learns of the whole truth, and resolves to reopen the case. Banruo uses Jun Niang to get information about Mei Changsu and the Poison of the Bitter Flame from Tong Lu. For the Spring Hunt, Prince Jing takes Mei Changsu and the Emperor to the retreat, leaving Prince Yu in the capital to instigate his own plan. Consort Jing asks to see Mei Changsu.
43	"Episode 43"	October 10, 2015	2.84; 3.18
Consort Jing asks to check Mei Changsu's pulse. However, after checking, she loses her composure and sends Prince Jing out of the tent so she may privately speak to her guest. After their talk, Prince Jing is suspicious of his mother's behavior. Back at the palace, Prince Yu pleads to the Empress to help him capture the capital and commit treason. Alarmed by the plot, Jun Niang sacrifices herself to let Tong Lu escape to warn Jiang Zuo Alliance that Prince Yu is planning to rebel. The message is later passed to Mei at the hunt; Prince Jing and Mei devise a plan to stop the rebellion. Prince Jing journey out to get reinforcement troops.
44	"Episode 44"	October 10, 2015	2.84; 3.18
After Prince Jing leaves, Meng Zhi and Mei Changsu plan their defenses. On the first day of the attack, the fortress' army fends off Prince Yu's Qing Li army with a surprise attack, causing them to retreat. Later, Prince Yu orders for his army to surround the mountain in secret; this is discovered by Mei, who orders Meng's soldiers to retaliate with boulders and arrows. Consort Jing has the imperial family transferred to the inside of the fortress, and orders Yujin to recruit all able-bodied people to fight. That night, Qing Li army falls into a trap set by Mei and are forced to retreat with fewer soldiers. Meng Zhi and his soldiers fight to defend the fortress; Princess Nihuang comes with reinforcements as well as Prince Jing's soldiers, and stops the rebellion. Prince Jing captures Prince Yu for the Emperor, who finds out that his son knows his true birth mother.
45	"Episode 45"	October 11, 2015	3.11; 3.28
Meng Zhi is ordered to capture back Jin Ling. Prince Jing starts to suspect the hidden identity of Mei Changsu. Just then, Nie Feng, a general for the Chiyan army, is captured by Prince Jing's subordinates; Mei Changsu realizes that Nie Feng is affected by the Poison of the Bitter Flame. Although Consort Jing is unable to treat the patient, Mei Changsu sends for Lin Chen. After finishing his medicine, Mei Changsu's symptoms relapse, which worries Prince Jing and his mother.
46	"Episode 46"	October 11, 2015	3.11; 3.28
Prince Jing tries to figure out Mei Changsu's true identity, but becomes discouraged after failing to find out. In the recapture of Jin Ling, Xia Jiang escapes from prison, angering the Emperor. He later asks Prince Ji if he should promote Prince Jing as Crown Prince. It is also revealed that it was Prince Ji who saved Tingshen. Empress Yan loses her position as Empress and is exiled, while Prince Yu is imprisoned, waiting for his sentence. Prince Yu ultimately commits suicide. While visiting Prince Ji, Yujin learns that if he had been born a girl, he would have been betrothed as an infant to a boy, but the arrangement ultimately would not have amounted to anything as the boy is implied to now be deceased (although not specified in the show, it is most likely Han Zhuo, Xia Jiang’s son, as he was around Yujin’s age and is presumed dead).
47	"Episode 47"	October 12, 2015	3.03; 3.57
Mei Changsu is also notified of Xie Yu's death, and starts to plan out how he can reopen the Chiyan case. Fei Liu helps Lin Chen capture Qin Banruo, so that he may interrogate her about Xia Jiang's whereabouts. Lin Chen also comes to the Su Residence to check up on Nie Feng and his poison. Xia Jiang secretly arranges a letter to be sent to Consort Yue. Mei Changsu arranges the escape of Xia Dong from prison, so that she may see her husband, Nie Feng. Lin Chen then explains the treatments available to cure Nie Feng, which horrifies Princess Nihuang and Meng Zhi.
48	"Episode 48"	October 12, 2015	3.03; 3.57
Xia Dong realizes that Mei Changsu is Lin Shu, and Mei Changsu finally convinces Princess Nihuang and Meng Zhi to not worry about him and his disease. Xia Jiang hides his letter in a gift box and sends it to a spy. The spy gives it to Consort Yue, and convinces her to help Xia Jiang. When the Emperor visits the consort, Yue tells the Emperor that Mei Changsu is Lin Shu poisoned with the "Bitter Flame". The king later orders people to search for the poison in the palace's library, to make sure the claim was not falsified.
49	"Episode 49"	October 13, 2015	2.96; 3.3
After reading his confession and finding evidence of the poison in the palace books, the emperor allows Xia Jiang to see him. The emperor also summons Mei Changsu and forces Meng Zhi to take leave. However, Gao Zhan secretly tells Consort Jing's maid to not let Mei Changsu go to the palace. Consort Jing passes the message to Prince Jing, but he could not stop Mei Changsu in time. The Emperor then summons Prince Jing and Xia Jiang; Xia Jiang accuses that Mei Changsu is Lin Shu and it was he who helped Prince Jing rise in power. However, he fails and is imprisoned again. The emperor also attempts to kill Mei Changsu himself, to prevent anymore problems, but he is stopped by Prince Jing. Prince Jing finally realizes Mei Changsu's true identity.
50	"Episode 50"	October 13, 2015	2.96; 3.3
Gao Zhan convinces the Emperor that Mei Changsu is not Lin Shu, because Prince Jing would not have let Mei Changsu go into Xuanjing Bureau. Cai Quan is informed of Xia Dong's escape and catches Meng Zhi sending the prisoner back. However, using Lin Chen's advice, Meng Zhi persuades Cai Quan to not make her escape a big deal. Xia Jiang's wife and son visit Marquise Yan and give him a list of hidden spies that may still be utilized by Xia Jiang. Mei Changsu and Consort Jing use the list to uproot the last of Xia Jiang's spies.

=== Ep 51-54 ===
No. in season	Title	Original release date	Ratings
51	"Episode 51"	October 14, 2015	2.76; 3.03
One of Xia Jiang's last disciples attempts to kill Grand Princess Liyang, but is fought off by the returned Xiao Jingrui, and killed by the undercover Zhen Ping. Wei Zheng, Li Gang and Zhen Ping find a Bingxu grass that they believe would cure Mei Changsu, but Lin Chen persuades them otherwise. Liyang and her son read Xie Yu's confession, but instead of handing it over to the Crown Prince, Prince Jing asks Liyang to turn in Xie Yu's confession before all the ministers during the Emperor's birthday party.
52	"Episode 52"	October 14, 2015	2.76; 3.03
Grand Princess Liyang agrees to present the confession to the Emperor. Lin Chen makes a mystery concoction out of the Bingxu grass. At the Emperor's birthday party, Liyang comes into the celebration and hands over the confession in front of the ministers as planned. One by one, the guests, ministers and nobles kneel before the emperor and beg him to reopen the case. He refuses, saying it is Xie Yu and Xia Jiang's fault he killed Prince Qi and the Chiyan army. However, he is physically powerless to stop their pleas.
53	"Episode 53"	October 15, 2015	3.27; 2.96
The emperor believes all of his subjects are rebelling against him, and accuses Mei Changsu of being the cause. He attempts to kill Mei Changsu, but is stopped by Prince Jing. Deluded, he returns to his chambers, where Consort Jing explains his wrongdoings and how responsible he is for the Chiyan incident. Mei Changsu confronts the emperor, who finally agrees to re-judge and re-investigate the Chiyan case, with the condition that Lin Shu must not reside in the palace, as he is a living reminder of the Emperor's mistakes. Mei Changsu agrees, stating that Lin Shu no longer exists anyway.
54	"Episode 54 (Finale)"	October 15, 2015	3.27; 2.96
Prince Jing erects a memorial for the deceased Lin Manor and the Chiyan soldiers. After the case is closed, Southern Chu attacks Da Liang's border, prompting Mei Changsu to help Prince Jing devise a plan to fight back. Mei Changsu convinces Prince Jing and Lin Chen to let him lead the army. He ingests the Bingxu pill to give himself three months of stimulated physical health, but after the three months, he would die. Mei Changsu promises Prince Jing that he would come back, and leads the army North with Meng Zhi, Fei Liu, Gong Yu, Yujin, Jingrui and Lin Chen. Mei Changsu ultimately does not return to Jin Ling. When Prince Jing becomes emperor, Meng Zhi requests a new name for the newly merged Expedition army and Shanyang army. The new Emperor renames it the "Chang Lin" army, in honor of Lin Shu and Mei Changsu.
