= Yujiulü Buluzhen =

Khagan of Rouran
- Reign: 414
- Predecessor: Yujiulü Hulü
- Successor: Yujiulü Datan
- Died: 414
- House: Yujiulü clan
- Father: Brother of Yujiulü Hulü
- Religion: Tengriism

Yujiulü Buluzhen (Chinese: 郁久閭步鹿真; pinyin: Yùjiǔlǘ Bùlùzhēn) (died 414) was an early 5th century ruler of the Rouran, a confederation of nomadic tribes in Mongolia. His title is not known.

== Rebellion ==
Little is known about background of Buluzhen, except that he was a nephew to Yujiulü Hulü. He confronted Hulü who was about to oversee the marriage of one of his own daughters to Feng Ba in 414. Buluzhen told him that his daughter was still small and was about travel far away; as she may get sick with longing, it would be necessary to send the daughters of noblemen, such as Shuli (樹黎) and Wudeyan (勿地延) with her. Hulü did not agree. Despite this Buluzhen told Shuli and others that Hulü was thinking of giving their daughters as a dowry for his daughter to a distant, alien state. In wake of this Shuli and other noblemen, entered into a conspiracy with Buluzhen. Some warriors were set up behind the Hulü's yurts at night and arrested him with his daughter. As result, Yujiulü Buluzhen was set up as khagan, with Shuli (树黎) as chancellor.

== Reign ==
After ascending to throne, he sent Yujiulü Hulü and his daughter to the Northern Yan. Feng Ba treated Hulü as an honored guest and, as originally planned, took Yujiulü's daughter as a concubine. Yujiulü Hulü requested that Feng Ba send an army to escort him home and, in May 414, Feng Ba, with some reluctance, gave him an escort commanded by general Wan Ling (萬陵) who, according to the account, returned after having killed Yujiulü Hulü along the way.

Buluzhen became involved in a love affair with a younger wife of Tiele leader Chiluohou (叱洛侯). Chiluohou was an early supporter of Shelun who entrusted him with his son Sheba (社拔). The younger wife revealed to Buluzhen that Chiluohou would support Datan against him and as a sign of fidelity, sent him a golden rein. In response, Buluzhen sent 8,000 cavalry against Chiluohou and burned all of his properties while Chiluohou committed suicide. After this, Buluzhen attacked Datan hastily, however Datan came out victorious and strangled both Sheba and Buluzhen, eliminating both rivals and then declared himself khagan.

Preceded by Yujiulü Hulü	Khagan of the Rouran; 414	Succeeded by Yujiulü Datan
