= Yucheng =

Yucheng may refer to:

== Places in China ==
- Yucheng, Shandong (禹城市), county-level city of Dezhou
- Yucheng County (虞城县), Shangqiu, Henan
- Yucheng District (雨城区), Ya'an, Sichuan
- Yucheng, Yutai County (鱼城镇), town in Yutai County, Shandong
- Yucheng, Zibo (域城镇), town in Boshan District, Zibo, Shandong
- Yucheng, Haiyan County, Zhejiang (于城镇), town in Haiyan County, Zhejiang

== Other uses ==
- Yujiulü Yucheng (reigned 464–485), ruler of the Rouran
