= Zhengshi =

Zhengshi (正始) was a Chinese era name used by several emperors of China. It may refer to:

- Zhengshi (240–249), era name used by Cao Fang, emperor of Cao Wei
- Zhengshi (407–409), era name used by Gao Yun (emperor)
- Zhengshi (504–508), era name used by Emperor Xuanwu of Northern Wei

Zhengzhi (正史) may also refer to the Twenty-Four Histories, the Chinese official histories.
