= Yongkang =

Yongkang (永康) may refer to:

== Places ==
=== China ===
- Yongkang, Zhejiang, a city in Zhejiang
- Yongkang Subdistrict, a subdistrict in Taonan, Baicheng, Jilin
- Yongkang, Anhui, a town in Dingyuan County, Anhui
- Yongkang, Ningxia, a town in Shapotou District, Zhongwei, Ningxia
- Yongkang, Yunnan, a town in Yongde County, Lincang. Yunnan
- Yongkang Prefecture, a historical name for the former Zhenkang Prefecture, in the area of present-day Zhengkang and Yongde Counties in Yunnan

=== Taiwan ===
- Yongkang District, a district and former city in Tainan, Taiwan

== Chinese historical eras ==
- Yongkang (167), an era name used by Emperor Huan of Han
- Yongkang (300–301), an era name used by Emperor Hui of Jin
- Yongkang (396–398), an era name used by Murong Bao, emperor of Later Yan
- Yongkang (412–419), an era name used by Qifu Chipan, ruler of Western Qin
- Yongkang (464–484), an era name used by Yujiulü Yucheng, khan of Rouran
