= Emperor Wencheng =

Emperor Wencheng may refer to:

- Feng Ba (died 430), emperor of Northern Yan
- Emperor Wencheng of Northern Wei (440–465)
