= Feng Hong =

Emperor Zhaocheng of Northern Yan 北燕昭成帝
- Heavenly King of Great Yan

Ruler of Northern Yan
- Reign: 430 – 436
- Predecessor: Feng Ba
- Died: 438; Goguryeo
Full name
- Family name: Féng (馮); Given name: Hóng (弘)
Era name and dates
- Tàixīng (太興): 431–436
Regnal name
- Heavenly King of Great Yan (大燕天王)
Posthumous name
- Emperor Zhāochéng (昭成皇帝, "civil and successful")
- House: Feng
- Dynasty: Northern Yan

Feng Hong (Chinese: 馮弘; died 438), courtesy name Wentong (文通), also known by his posthumous name as the Emperor Zhaocheng of Northern Yan (北燕昭成帝), was the last monarch of the Chinese Northern Yan dynasty. He seized the throne in 430 when his brother Feng Ba (Emperor Wencheng) was ill, and he used the title "Heavenly King". During his reign, the Northern Yan grew increasingly smaller and weaker in light of repeated attacks by rival Northern Wei dynasty, and in 436 he evacuated his state and fled to Goguryeo, ending the Northern Yan. Once in Goguryeo, however, he assumed the role of Goguryeo's suzerain (a status he had claimed earlier). King Jangsu of Goguryeo, unable to stand Feng Hong's antics, killed him in 438 although he gave Feng Hong a posthumous name.

== During Gao Yun's reign ==
It is not known when Feng Hong was born, but it is known that he was Feng Ba's younger brother. There was no historical record about him until 407, after his brother Feng Ba (along with another brother, Feng Sufu (馮素弗), as long as others) had overthrown the tyrannical Later Yan emperor Murong Xi and made Murong Xi's adoptive nephew Murong Yun emperor. (Murong Yun, who soon changed his name back to the original Gao Yun, is regarded by some as the last emperor of Later Yan and by some as the first emperor of Northern Yan.) Late in 407, Gao Yun commissioned Feng Hong as a major general. Probably also at the same time (but definitely during Gao Yun's reign), Feng Hong was created the Duke of Ji.

After Gao Yun was assassinated by his attendants Li Ban (離班) and Tao Ren (桃仁) in 409, the officials of the regime supported Feng Ba as the new emperor. Feng Ba, when he took the throne, gave a promotion to Feng Hong, but continued to let him carry the title of Duke of Ji.

== During Feng Ba's reign ==
In 410, Feng Ba's cousin Feng Wani (馮萬泥) and another cousin's son Feng Ruchen (馮乳陳) both felt that they contributed much to Feng Ba's success, and therefore were resentful that they were not at Longcheng and in control of the imperial government but were required to serve as commanding generals at the cities of Feiru (肥如, in modern Qinhuangdao, Hebei) and Bailang (白狼, in modern Zhaoyang, Liaoning). They therefore rose in rebellion together. Feng Ba sent Feng Hong and Zhang Xing to attack them, and after they were defeated by Feng Hong and Zhang, they surrendered, but Feng Hong executed them regardless. After this incident, Feng Ba created him the Duke of Zhongshan.

Little is known about Feng Hong's actions during most of Feng Ba's reign, other than that he appeared to have remained in powerful positions, and by 430 he was Feng Ba's prime minister. That year, Feng Ba was seriously ill, and he issued an edict transferring his authorities to his crown prince Feng Yi (馮翼). However, Feng Ba's favorite concubine Consort Song wanted to have her son Feng Shouju (馮受居) inherit the throne, and therefore told Feng Yi that Feng Ba would soon recover and that he should not be so anxious to take over authority; Feng Yi agreed and retreated to his palace. Consort Song then falsely issued orders in Feng Ba's name cutting off communications with the outside, and Feng Yi and Feng Ba's other sons, as well as imperial officials, were not allowed to see Feng Ba. Only one of her trusted officials, Hu Fu (胡福), was able to enter the palace to be in charge of security. However, Hu was secretly resentful of Consort Song's ambitions, and he informed Feng Hong of her intentions. Feng Hong immediately attacked the palace and seized control of it. Feng Ba, hearing up this, died in shock. Feng Hong then took the throne himself and, after defeating Feng Yi's troops, slaughtered all of Feng Ba's sons. He used the title "Heavenly King" (Tian Wang).

== Reign ==
What appeared evidence late in Feng Ba's reign, but even more so in Feng Hong's reign, were incessant attacks by the neighboring rival Northern Wei. This appeared to be particularly true after Northern Wei annexed all of the territory of Xia in 431 and therefore no longer had a major western rival to deal with. Emperor Taiwu of Northern Wei made periodic attacks to pillage Northern Yan territory and then withdraw, draining Northern Yan of food supplies and other resources and weakening it.

While Feng Hong was the Duke of Zhongshan, his wife was Lady Wang, who bore him at least three sons, Feng Chong (馮崇), Feng Lang (馮朗), and Feng Miao (馮邈), and Feng Chong was his oldest son. However, in 431, Feng Hong created Lady Murong princess instead, and in 432, he created Princess Murong's son Feng Wangren (馮王仁) crown prince.

In fall 432, Northern Wei's Emperor Taiwu made the first major attack of Feng Hong's reign, heading for Northern Yan's capital Helong (和龍, in modern Jinzhou, Liaoning). Feng Hong tried to appease the Northern Wei emperor by delivering gifts of beef and wine to his army, to no avail. 10 Northern Yan commanderies surrendered to Northern Wei, and Northern Wei forces captured a number of Northern Yan cities and put Helong under siege. However, two months later, Emperor Taiwu withdrew after capturing 30,000 households from Northern Yan and relocating them to his You Province (幽州, modern Beijing, Tianjin, and northern Hebei). Feng Hong's official Guo Yuan (郭淵) suggested to Feng Hong that he offer to be a Northern Wei vassal and send a daughter to be Emperor Taiwu's consort, but Feng Hong refused, stating that the enmity between the states were so deep that he would be killed anyway even if he surrendered. (While Northern Wei was sieging Helong, the Northern Wei general Zhu Xiuzhi (朱脩之), who had been captured from Liu Song, plotted to assassinate Emperor Taiwu and then join Feng Hong, but his plot was discovered, and he fled to Feng Hong, who in turn sent him back to Liu Song, seeking Liu Song aid. Henceforth, Liu Song and Northern Yan were informal allies, although Liu Song provided little actual help.)

Around the new year 433, Feng Lang and Feng Miao, believing that Northern Yan was on the verge of destruction and believing that Princess Murong was planning to have them killed, fled to Liaoxi (遼西, in modern Tangshan, Hebei), where Feng Hong had sent their older brother Feng Chong to be the commanding general of. They persuaded Feng Chong to surrender to Northern Wei, and Feng Chong sent Feng Miao to Northern Wei to offer his allegiance. Feng Hong, in response, sent his general Feng Yu (封羽) to put Liaoxi under siege. In spring 433, Emperor Taiwu sent his younger brother Tuoba Jian (拓拔健) the Prince of Yongchang to relieve Liaoxi, and further created Feng Chong the Prince of Liaoxi with a number of other honors, to try to encourage other defectors. Tuoba Jian's forces soon surrounded Feng Yu and forced his surrender, and then withdrew with 3,000 captive households. Feng Chong then requested permission to go to Helong to persuade Feng Hong to surrender, but Emperor Taiwu did not grant such permission.

In spring 434, Feng Hong sent messengers to Northern Wei to request peaceful relations. Emperor Taiwu refused. However, three months later, after Feng Hong submitted a petition (i.e., agreeing to be a vassal) denouncing himself and pleading for peace, and further offering a daughter to be Emperor Taiwu's concubine, Emperor Taiwu agreed—on condition that Feng Hong send Feng Wangren to visit him at the Northern Wei capital Pingcheng (平城, in modern Datong, Shanxi). Feng Hong also sent the Northern Wei messenger Huniuyu Shimen (忽忸于什門), whom Emperor Taiwu's father Emperor Mingyuan of Northern Wei had sent to Feng Ba in 414 but who then was detained by Feng Ba, back to Northern Wei.

However, later that year, Feng Hong refused to send Feng Wangren to Pingcheng to visit Emperor Taiwu. When his official Liu Zi (劉滋) warned him that Northern Yan was in an even more perilous position than Shu Han and Eastern Wu were facing against Jin, Feng Hong executed Liu in anger. Because Feng Hong refused to send Feng Wangren, Emperor Taiwu again sent Tuoba Jian against Northern Yan, and Tuoba Jian seized Northern Yan's crops and some of its people before withdrawing.

In spring 435, in order to try to get Liu Song aid, Feng Hong sent a messenger to the Liu Song capital Jiankang to submit as a vassal. Emperor Wen of Liu Song created Feng Hong the Prince of Yan, but was unable to provide substantial aid. in spring 435, Feng Hong sent his general Tang Zhu (湯燭) to offer tributes to Northern Wei, and claiming that the reason why Feng Wangren was not arriving was because he was ill. This reason appeared to have been rejected by Northern Wei, and Feng Hong again tried to seek Liu Song aid, but none was coming. In summer 435, Emperor Taiwu's brother Tuoba Pi (拓拔丕) the Prince of Leping again arrived at Helong, and Feng Hong tried to appease him by offering cattle, wine, and armor, but Tuoba Pi's assistant general Qutu Yuan (屈突垣) accused Feng Hong of not sending hostages, and they seized 6,000 Northern Yan men and women before withdrawing.

The entire Northern Yan state was by this point not significantly larger than the city of Helong itself, and it was weary of repeated Northern Wei attacks. Feng Hong's general Yang Min (楊岷) suggested Feng Hong to send Feng Wangren as a hostage, and Feng Hong refused, instead considering the plan of evacuating his people to the ally Goguryeo. Yang believed Goguryeo to be undependable, but Feng Hong was not deterred, and he sent messengers to Goguryeo seeking aid and agreement to evacuate.

In spring 436, Feng Hong sent messengers to Northern Wei to offer tributes, and declaring that Feng Wangren would arrive briefly. Emperor Taiwu, not believing in Feng Hong, refused the overture and prepared another attack. By summer 436, Northern Wei and Goguryeo forces both arrived at Helong. Because the people largely were weary about relocating to Goguryeo, the official Guo Sheng (郭生) opened the city gates and tried to surrender, but Northern Wei forces thought it was a trap and did not aid him, and Feng Hong killed Guo in battle. Meanwhile, the Goguryeo forces pillaged the city, and then escorted Feng Hong and his people to head east, after Feng Hong set fire to the palace. Northern Yan was now at its end, as Feng Hong no longer had any territory of his own.

== After evacuation to Goguryeo ==
Northern Wei sent messengers to demand Goguryeo's King Jangsu turn over Feng Hong, but King Jangsu refused. However, his own relationship with Feng Hong was not good, for when he first welcomed Feng Hong to his land, he treated Feng Hong as an honored guest—but Feng Hong demanded to be treated as the suzerain and was angry that King Jangsu referred him as "the Prince of Longcheng" rather than Heavenly King. Despite this conflict, King Jangsu settled Feng Hong's people at Pingguo (平郭, in modern Yingkou, Liaoning), and then at Beifeng (北豐, in modern Shenyang, Liaoning).

Because Feng Hong still viewed Goguryeo as a vassal and often looked down on its people, he continued to treat his people as an independent state, ignoring the Goguryeo laws and ignoring King Jangsu's orders. King Jangsu could not endure this, and he sent troops to seize some of Feng Hong's ladies in waiting, and also seized Feng Wangren as hostage. By 438, Feng Hong was so angry that he sent messengers to Liu Song, requesting that he be escorted to Liu Song. Emperor Wen sent the general Wang Baiju (王白駒) to Goguryeo, ordering Goguryeo to prepare to let Feng Hong leave. King Jangsu was unwilling to let Feng Hong depart, and so sent his generals to execute Feng Hong and his sons, although he gave Feng Hong an imperial posthumous name. In response, Wang attacked the Goguryeo forces who executed Feng Hong. However, King Jangsu seized Wang and sent him back to Liu Song, demanding that he be imprisoned, and Emperor Wen did so for a time before releasing him.

== Personal information ==
- Father
  - Feng An (馮安), Western Yan general
- Wives
  - Duchess Wang, mother of Dukes Chong, Lang, and Miao
  - Princess Murong, mother of Crown Prince Wangren
- Children
  - Feng Chong (馮崇), the Duke of Changle, later Prince of Liaoxi of Northern Wei
  - Feng Lang (馮朗), the Duke of Guangping, later father of Empress Feng of Northern Wei
  - Feng Miao (馮邈), the Duke of Leling
  - Feng Wangren (馮王仁), the Crown Prince (created 432)

Emperor Zhaocheng of (Northern) Yan House of Feng Died: 438
Regnal titles
Preceded by Feng Ba	Emperor of Northern Yan; 430–436	Extinct
Titles in pretence
Preceded by Feng Ba	— TITULAR — Emperor of China; 430–436; Reason for succession failure: Annexed by Northern Wei	Succeeded by Emperor Taiwu of Northern Wei
