= Princess Lelang =

Princess Lelang (樂浪公主)
- Born: late 4th century or early 5th century
- Died: after 411
- Spouse: Yujiulü Hulü
- Father: Feng Ba
- Mother: Princess Sun

Princess Lelang (Chinese: 樂浪公主) (fl. 411) was a princess of the Northern Yan dynasty and a consort of the Yujiulü Hulü (Aikugai Khagan) of the Rouran Khaganate. She was the daughter of Feng Ba (Emperor Wencheng of Northern Yan) and Princess Sun.

In 411 Yujiulü Hulü, offered a tribute of 3,000 horses to Feng Ba and requested to marry Feng Ba's daughter Princess Lelang. Feng Ba, believing that an alliance with Rouran would be beneficial to his state, gave Princess Lelang in marriage to him.

== Sources ==
- Book of Jin, Volume 125, Record 25, Feng Ba (Feng Sufu).
