= Empress Li (Huiyi) =

Empress Li (李皇后, personal name unknown) (died 409?) was an empress whose husband Gao Yun (Emperor Huiyi) is considered, depending on which historical view is involved, to have been either the last emperor of the Xianbei-led Chinese Later Yan dynasty or the first emperor of Later Yan's successor state Northern Yan dynasty.

Very little is known about Empress Li. After Gao Yun became emperor after his adoptive uncle Murong Xi (Emperor Zhaowen) was overthrown in 407, he created her empress in 408. It is not known whether his crown prince Gao Pengcheng (高彭城) was her son or not. In 409, Gao Yun was assassinated, and general confusion ensued. It appeared that she died in that confusion as well, for when Gao Yun's successor Feng Ba (Emperor Wencheng) buried Gao Yun with imperial honors in 410, Empress Li was buried with Gao Yun.

Chinese royalty
Preceded by Empress Fu Xunying	Empress of Later Yan; 407–409	Succeeded by None (dynasty destroyed)
Preceded by Empress Fu Xunying	Empress of China (Liaoning); 407–409	Succeeded by Princess Sun
Preceded by None (dynasty founded)	Empress of Northern Yan; 407–409	
