= 371 =

371 in various calendars
Gregorian calendar	371; CCCLXXI
Ab urbe condita	1124
Assyrian calendar	5121
Balinese saka calendar	292–293
Bengali calendar	−223 – −222
Berber calendar	1321
Buddhist calendar	915
Burmese calendar	−267
Byzantine calendar	5879–5880
Chinese calendar	庚午年 (Metal Horse); 3068 or 2861 — to — 辛未年 (Metal Goat); 3069 or 2862
Coptic calendar	87–88
Discordian calendar	1537
Ethiopian calendar	363–364
Hebrew calendar	4131–4132
- Hindu calendars
Vikram Samvat	427–428
Shaka Samvat	292–293
Kali Yuga	3471–3472
Holocene calendar	10371
Iranian calendar	251 BP – 250 BP
Islamic calendar	259 BH – 258 BH
Javanese calendar	253–254
Julian calendar	371; CCCLXXI
Korean calendar	2704
Minguo calendar	1541 before ROC 民前1541年
Nanakshahi calendar	−1097
Seleucid era	682/683 AG
Thai solar calendar	913–914
Tibetan calendar	阳金马年 (male Iron-Horse); 497 or 116 or −656 — to — 阴金羊年 (female Iron-Goat); 498 or 117 or −655

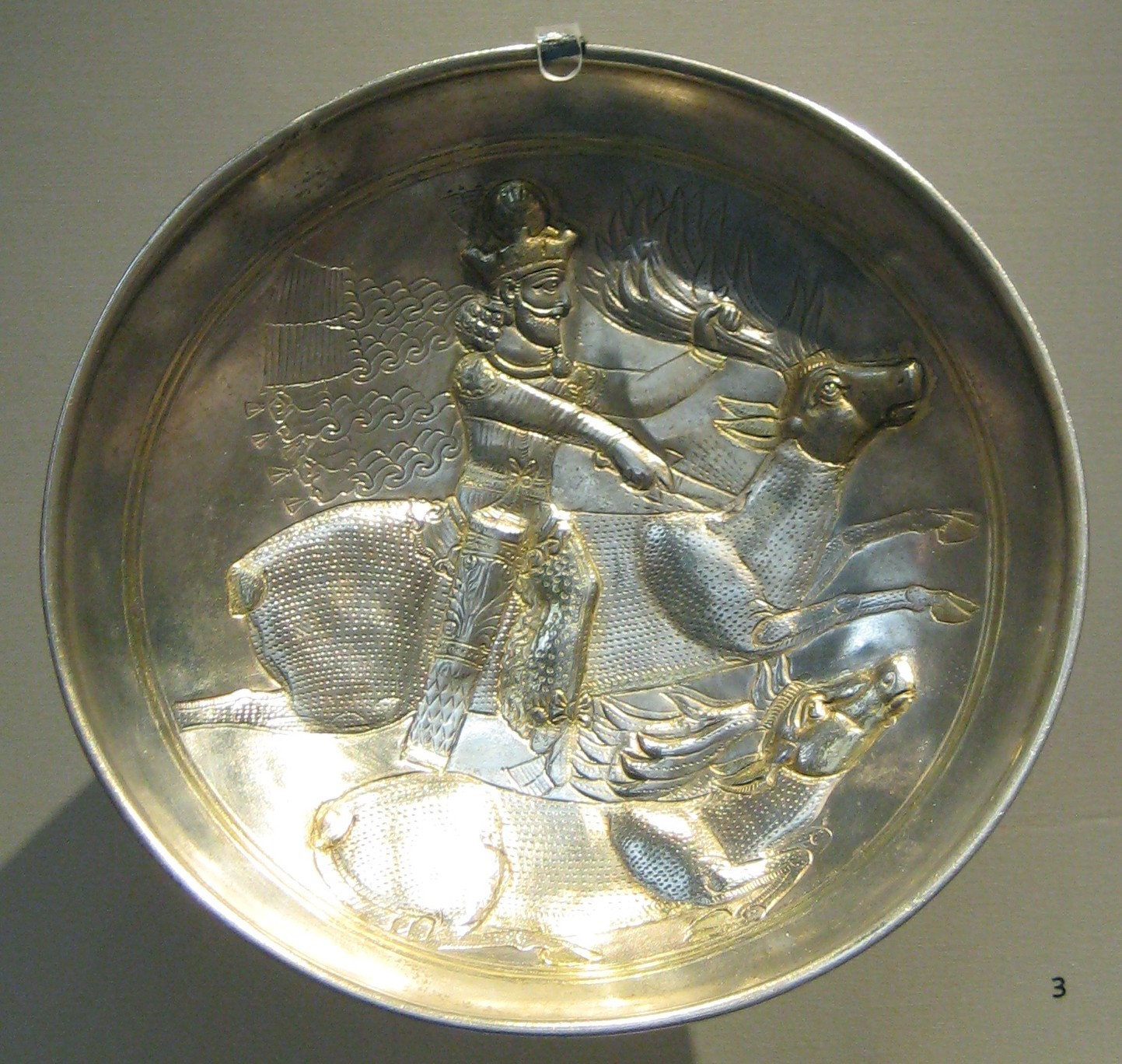
Silver plate of King Shapur II

Year 371 (CCCLXXI) was a common year starting on Saturday of the Julian calendar. At the time, it was known as the Year of the Consulship of Augustus and Petronius (or, less frequently, year 1124 Ab urbe condita). The denomination 371 for this year has been used since the early medieval period, when the Anno Domini calendar era became the prevalent method in Europe for naming years.

== Events ==
=== By place ===
==== Roman Empire ====
- The fortified cities of the Danube, with Sirmium (Pannonia) at the forefront, contribute to stop an invasion of the Quadi.

==== Persia ====
- The Persian Empire attains the zenith of its power under King Shapur II as the Romans renew their war against Persia. Hostilities will continue for the next 5 years.

==== Asia ====
- Baekje forces sack the city of P'yongyang in Goguryeo.
- Sosurim becomes king of Goguryeo.

=== By topic ===
==== Art and Science ====
- Roman poet Ausonius writes of a voyage on the Rhine and the Moselle in his work 'Mosella'.

==== Religion ====
- Augustine of Hippo, age 17, travels to Carthage to continue his education in rhetoric.
- Martin of Tours becomes bishop of Tours (approximate date).

== Births ==
- Dao Wu Di, Chinese emperor of Northern Wei (d. 409)
- Sengrui, Chinese Buddhist monk and scholar (d. 438)
- Valentinian II, Roman consul and emperor (d. 392)

== Deaths ==
- April 12 – Zeno of Verona, Christian bishop and martyr
- August 1 – Eusebius of Vercelli, Christian bishop (b. 283)
- Gogugwon, king of Goguryeo (Korea)
- Hilarion, Syrian anchorite and saint (b. 291)
- Lucifer Calaritanus, Christian bishop (approximate date)
