= Yujiulü Datan =

Khagan of Rouran
- Reign: 414–429
- Predecessor: Yujiulü Buluzhen
- Successor: Yujiulü Wuti
- Died: July 429
Regnal name
- Móuhànhéshēnggài Kèhán (牟汗紇升蓋可汗); Mökögesügei Qaγan; Victorious Khagan
- House: Yujiulü clan
- Father: Yujiulü Puhun
- Religion: Tengriism

Yujiulü Datan (Chinese: 郁久閭大檀; pinyin: Yùjiǔlǘ Dàtán) (?–429 AD) was the ruler of the Rouran from 414 to July 429 with the title of Mouhanheshenggai Khagan (牟汗紇升蓋可汗; Rouran: Mökögesügei Qaγan).

== Life ==
He was a son of Yujiulü Puhun (郁久閭僕浑), thus a cousin of Yujiulü Hulü who in 414 was overthrown by his nephew Yujiulü Buluzhen. Later Buluzhen became involved in an affair with a younger wife of the Tiele leader Chiluohou (叱洛侯). Chiluohou was an early supporter of Shelun who entrusted him with his son Sheba (社拔). The younger wife revealed to Buluzhen that Chiluohou would support Datan against Buluzhen. In response, Buluzhen sent 8,000 cavalry against Chiluohou and burned all his properties while Chiluohou committed suicide. After this, Buluzhen attacked Datan hastily, however Datan came out victorious and strangled both Sheba and Buluzhen, eliminating both rivals and then declared himself khagan.

== Reign ==
He immediately allied himself to Feng Ba upon gaining throne and warred against the Northern Wei. Datan led the troops to raid the border in the winter of 415, but Emperor Mingyuan met him with his army. Datan began to retreat but the Wei general Daxi Jin rushed after him. His forces ran into severe weather and had many casualties to frostbite. This began a pattern that would last for centuries—often, Rouran would attack, and the Northern Wei would successfully counter-attack, but then would be unable to gain decisive victories over the Rouran. Meanwhile Datan reinforced relations with the Northern Yan and sent a tribute of 3,000 horses and 10,000 sheep in 417.

In 423, almost immediately after Emperor Taiwu took the throne, Datan attacked the Northern Wei with about 60,000 soldiers. Emperor Taiwu engaged Rouran troops, and during their first engagement became surrounded, but he fought his way out of danger. Subsequently, he made nearly yearly attacks against the Rouran, and each year, Rouran forces would elude him by retreating north, only to return south after he withdrew.

He was planning another invasion of Wei in 427, but the destruction of Xia and capture of Helian Chang, forced him to reconsider and back down. Another raid was made by Rouran in 428 with 10,000 cavalry.

In 429, on the advice of Cui Hao, and against the advice of all other officials and his wet nurse Nurse Empress Dowager Dou, Emperor Taiwu attacked Rouran. Cui believed that further major conflicts with Liu Song were inevitable, and that the Northern Wei must first deal the Rouran a major defeat to avoid being attacked on both sides. However, Cui did not accompany Emperor Taiwu on this campaign, although he did inform Kou Qianzhi, another Wei official, that the main Rouran force must be found and destroyed. Emperor Taiwu engaged the Rouran and dealt them a mjaor blow, but was unable to find Datan. He did not want to advance any further in fear of a trap, and even when Kou informed him of what what Cui had said, he stopped the pursuit. Only later did he find out that he was actually close to Yujiulü Datan's position and could have easily found and killed him. Datan on the other hand died from an illness on his way and was succeeded in 429 by Yujiulü Wuti.

== Family ==
He had at least 4 sons and a daughter:

- Yujiulü Wuti
- Yujiulü Tulugui (郁久閭秃鹿傀)
- Yujiulü Qiliegui (郁久閭乞列归)
- Yujiulü Qilifu (郁久閭俟力弗) - ancestor of Yujiulü Furen (郁久闾伏仁, d. 29 November 586), a Sui dynasty official
- Yujiulü Zuozhaoyi (郁久閭左昭仪) - married to Emperor Taiwu, became mother of Tuoba Yu

He also had several younger brothers named Tāwu Wúluhú (他吾无鹿胡), Yuedai (悅代), Pili (匹黎), Yujiulü Fèng (郁久閭闾凤), Yujiulü Dafei (郁久閭大肥), Yujiulü Danibeiyi (郁久閭大埿倍颐) and Yujiulü Lin (郁久閭驎). Latter four submitted to Northern Wei and adopted Chinese surname of Lü (闾), a short form of Yujiulü. Dafei subsequently was created Prince Zhongshan (中山王) and was married to Princess Huoze (濩澤公主), daughter of Emperor Daowu. His other brothers Feng and Lin were created Marquis of Xingyang (荥阳公) in Northern Wei.

== In popular media ==
- He was portrayed by Bao Depan (包德磐) in Chinese TV Series "The Story of Mulan" (花木兰传奇)

Preceded by Yujiulü Buluzhen	Khagan of the Rouran; 414–429	Succeeded by Yujiulü Wuti
