= Yujiulü Hulü =

Khagan of Rouran
- Reign: 410–414
- Predecessor: Yujiulü Shelun
- Successor: Yujiulü Buluzhen
- Died: May 414
- Spouses: Princess Lelang (樂浪公主) of Northern Yan
Regnal name
- Aikugai Khagan (藹苦蓋可汗); Uqaqai Qaγan; Khagan with fine qualities
- House: Yujiulü clan
- Father: Yujiulü Mangeti
- Religion: Tengriism

Yujiulü Hulü (Chinese: 郁久閭斛律; pinyin: Yùjiǔlǘ Húlǜ) (died 414) was an early 5th century ruler of the Rouran, a confederation of nomadic tribes in Mongolia with the title Aikugai Khagan (藹苦蓋可汗; Rouran: Uqaqai Qaγan).

== Marriage to Northern Yan princess ==
There is historical indication that Yujiulü Hulü (郁久閭斛律) began his rule in May 410 and, the following year, offered a tribute of three thousand horses to the Northern Yan ruler Feng Ba, with a request to marry Feng Ba's daughter, Princess Lelang (樂浪公主), who was probably the daughter of Feng Ba's wife, Princess Sun. Feng Ba's brother, Feng Sufu, suggested refusing the request and sending the daughter of one of Feng Ba's concubines instead, but Feng Ba was apparently convinced that an alliance with the Rouran would be beneficial to his state, and agreed to marry Princess Lelang to Yujiulü Hulü in 411.

== Deposition and exile ==
In 414, as he was about to oversee the marriage of one of his own daughters to Feng Ba, he was confronted by his nephew Yujiulü Buluzhen (郁久閭步鹿真) who told him that his daughter was still small and was about travel far away; as she may get sick with longing, it would be necessary to send the daughters of the nobleman, such as Shuli (樹黎) and Wudeyan (勿地延) with her. Hulü did not agree with him. Despite this Buluzhen told Shuli and others that Hulü was thinking of giving their daughters as a dowry for his daughter to a distant, alien state. In wake of this Shuli and other noblemen, entered into a conspiracy with Buluzhen. Some warriors were set up behind the Hulü's yurts at night and arrested him with his daughter. As a result, Yujiulü Buluzhen was set up as khagan, with Shuli (树黎) as chancellor.

Meanwhile Buluzhen sent Yujiulü Hulü and his daughter to the Northern Yan. Feng Ba treated him as an honored guest and, as originally planned, took Yujiulü's daughter, Zhaoyi (昭仪), as a concubine. Yujiulü Hulü requested that Feng Ba send an army to escort him home and, in May 414, Feng Ba, with some reluctance, gave him an escort commanded by general Wan Ling (萬陵) who, according to the account, returned after having killed Yujiulü Hulü along the way.

Preceded by Yujiulü Shelun	Khagan of the Rouran; 410–414	Succeeded by Yujiulü Buluzhen
