= Yujiulü Tuhezhen =

Khagan of Rouran
- Reign: 444–464
- Predecessor: Yujiulü Wuti
- Successor: Yujiulü Yucheng
- Died: 464
- Issue: Yujiulü Yucheng; Yujiulü Nagai
Regnal name
- Chù Kèhán (处可汗); Ču Qaγan; Respectfully Assenting Khagan
- House: Yujiulü clan
- Father: Yujiulü Wuti
- Religion: Tengriism

Yujiulü Tuhezhen (Chinese: 郁久閭吐賀真; pinyin: Yùjiǔlǘ Tǔhèzhēn) was the ruler of the Rouran from September 444 to 464 with the title of Chu Khagan (處可汗; Rouran: Ču Qaγan). He was the son of Yujiulü Wuti.

== Reign ==
Though he inherited a war with the Northern Wei from his father the first five years of his reign were relatively calm. In the winter of 448 and spring of 449, Emperor Taiwu and Crown Prince Huang of Northern Wei attacked the Rouran together, but Tuhezhen eluded them. In the fall of 449, however, Tuoba Na, a Wei general inflicted heavy losses on the Rouran, and for several years, the Rouran did not attack.

In the winter of 458, Emperor Wencheng of Northern Wei launched a major attack against the Rouran, but considered abandoning it when his troops encountered a snowstorm. At Yuchi Juan's urging (arguing that a withdrawal would signal weakness to the Rouran), however, Emperor Wencheng continued, and while he was not able to win a major victory against Tuhezhen, a number of Rouran tribesmen surrendered.

The last remnant of the Northern Liang was invaded and Juqu Anzhou deposed in 460. Tuhezhen made Kan Bozhou (闞伯周) the King of Gaochang instead.

He was succeeded by Yujiulü Yucheng in 464.

== Sources ==
- History of the Northern Dynasties, vol. 86.
- Book of Wei, vol 103.

Preceded by Yujiulü Wuti	Khagan of the Rouran; 444–450	Succeeded by Yujiulü Yucheng
