= Yujiulü Wuti =

Khagan of Rouran
- Reign: 429–444
- Predecessor: Yujiulü Datan
- Successor: Yujiulü Tuhezhen
- Died: 444
- Spouses: Princess Xihai of Northern Wei
Regnal name
- Chìlián Kèhán (敕連可汗); Tengri Qaγan; Divine Khagan
- House: Yujiulü clan
- Father: Yujiulü Datan
- Religion: Tengriism

Yujiulü Wuti (Chinese: 郁久閭吳提; pinyin: Yùjiǔlǘ Wútí) was a ruler of the Rouran (July, 429 – September, 444) with the title of Chilian Khagan (敕連可汗; Rouran: Tengri Qaγan). He was the son of Yujiulü Datan.

== Reign ==
In 432, the Northern Wei captured 20 Rouran warriors at the border, but Emperor Taiwu pardoned them. Impressed, Wuti sent him tribute for this. In 435, Wuti married Princess Xihai (西海公主) a cousin or sister of Emperor Taiwu and gave his sister to Taiwu as a concubine. She was accompanied by Wuti's brother Yujiulü Tulugui (郁久閭秃鹿傀) who presented 2,000 horses to the Emperor. In 436–437, Wuti unexpectedly violated the peace by attacking the border. Taiwu responded by declaring war on the Rouran. But the campaign ended soon since Wei had no more provisions, and they did not seize the Rouran cattle.

He was involved in Wei's war against the Northern Liang in 439. The situation was a result of the Northern Wei's messengers to the Xiyu kingdoms, who went through Northern Liang territory frequently, who alleged that Juqu Mujian had informed the Xiyu kingdoms that they should not submit to the Northern Wei and should instead submit to the Rouran. At the encouragement of the prime minister Cui Hao, Emperor Taiwu again prepared military action. With Yuan He, the son of the Southern Liang's last prince Tufa Rutan, as guide, he launched a speedy attack and arrived at Guzang quickly. Juqu Mujian, in shock, refused to surrender, defending the city against a siege, while seeking immediate military assistance from Wuti. Yujiulü Wuti launched a surprise attack on Pingcheng to try to force Emperor Taiwu to abandon the campaign, but after initial successes, he failed to capture Pingcheng, and his brother Yujiulü Qiliegui (郁久閭乞列歸) was captured by Northern Wei forces. About 10,000 Rouran soldiers were killed.

In the fall of 443, while attacking the Rouran, Emperor Taiwu encountered Wuti, and Crown Prince Huang, who was with him, advised an immediate attack, but Emperor Taiwu hesitated, allowing Wuti to escape.

In 444, Taiwu began a new attack against the Rouran. Wuti was defeated and fled. He later died and was succeeded by Yujiulü Tuhezhen.

== Family ==
He was married to Princess Xihai (西海公主) a cousin or sister of Emperor Taiwu in 434. His sister was also married to Taiwu, becoming mother of Tuoba Yu.

== In popular media ==
- He was portrayed by He Jianze (何建澤) in Chinese TV Series "The Story of Mulan" (花木兰传奇)

Preceded by Yujiulü Datan	Khagan of the Rouran; 429–444	Succeeded by Yujiulü Tuhezhen
