= Yujiulü clan =

Ruling clan of the Rouran Khaganate

Yujiulü
- Current region: China; Mongolia
- Founded: 4th century
- Founder: Yujiulü Mugulü
- Dissolution: 555

The Yujiulü clan (Chinese: 郁久閭氏; reconstructed Middle Chinese: ʔjuk kjǝu ljwo) was the ruling clan of the Rouran Khaganate, which ruled over Northern China, the Mongolian Steppe and Southern Siberia.

== Origin ==
According to Book of Wei and History of the Northern Dynasties, the surname Yujiulü is of Donghu origin. The first known Yujiulü was a slave caught by Xianbei mounted raiders under the reign of Tuoba Liwei. The slave, whose hairline started at his eyebrows' level, was called Mùgúlǘ (木骨閭) - "bald-headed" in the Xianbei language. When grown-up, Mugulü was noted for his strength, emancipated and recruited as a cavalry soldier. For tarrying past the deadline, he was sentenced to death by beheading. But he fled to the mountains and ravines in the Gobi Desert, where he gathered another 100 fugitives. The fugitives sought refuge under the Gaoche tribe called Hetulin (紇突隣). The descendants of Mugulü and his companions became the nucleus of the future Rouran Khaganate. Alexander Vovin proposes that Mùgúlǘ (木骨閭), in reconstructed Middle Chinese *muwk-kwot-ljo, transcribed Tuoba Xianbei *moqo-lo ~ muqo-lo 'bald head', which is analysable as 'one [who/]which has cut-off/fallen-off [hair]' and cognate with Mongolic lexical items like Written Mongolian moɣutur ~ moqutur 'blunt, hornless, bald tail' (cf. Chinese gloss: 禿尾 'bald tail'), moqu-ɣar, Middle Mongol muqular 'hornless', moqo-dag 'blunt'; all of those are from Proto-Mongolic *muqu 'to be cut off, break off, fall off', which in turn would produce the semantic variation 'blunt ~ hornless ~ hairless ~ bald'.

Later on, his dynasty was called Yujiulü, which sounded like Mugulü. Róna-Tas suggests that Yujiulü renders *ugur(i) > Uğur, a secondary form of Oğur.; Peter B. Golden additionally proposes connection with Turkic uğurluğ "feasible, opportune", later "auspicious fortunate" or oğrï "thief", an etymology more suited to the dynasty's founder's activities; additionally Yujiulü may be comparable to Middle Mongolian uğuli "owl" (> Khakha ууль uul'), as personal names based on bird names are common in Mongolic.

== Family tree ==
Yujiulü clan

Mugulü 木骨闾
Cheluhui 车鹿会
Tunugui 吐奴傀
Bati 跋提
Disuyuan 地粟袁
Wenheti 缊纥提	Pihouba 匹候跋	Puhun 僕渾
□	Jiguizhi 诘归之	Shelun 社崘 ?-402–410	Hulü 斛律 ?-410–414	Héduōhàn 曷多汗 ?-?–402	Qiba 启拔	Wujie 吴颉	Lü Dafei 闾大肥	Lu; Dàníbèiyí 闾大埿倍颐	Lu Lín 闾驎
Buluzhen 步鹿真 ?–414	Duba 度拔	Shèba 社拔 ?–414	Zhāoyí 昭仪	Feng Ba 馮跋 (d. 430)	Datan 大檀 ?-414–429	Tāw; Wúluhú 他吾无鹿胡	Pili 匹黎	Lu Fèng 闾凤
Princess; Xihai 西海公主	Wuti 吴提 ?-429–444	Tulugui 秃鹿傀	Qǐlièguī 乞列归	Qilifu 俟力弗	Lu; Zuǒzhāoyí 闾左昭仪	Emperor; Taiwu 北魏太武帝; 408–452
Tuhezhen 吐贺真 ?-444–464	Emperor; Tuoba Yu 拓拔余
Yucheng 予成 ?-464–485	Nagai 那盖 ?-492–506
Doulun 豆仑 ?-485–492	Dengshuzi 邓叔子 ?-553–555	Futu 伏图 ?-506–508	□	□
Chounu 丑奴 ?-508–520	Qínifa 俟匿伐	Anagui 阿那瓌 ?-520–552	Zuhui 祖惠	Yǐjufa 乙居伐 ?–520	Tahan 塔寒	Tutujiā 秃突佳	Poluomen 婆羅門 ?-521–525	Dengzhu 登注俟利 ?-552–553
Wen of Western Wei; 507–535–551	Empress; Dao 悼皇后; 525–540	Anluochen 庵罗辰 ?-553–554	Lanling of Eastern Wei 乐安公主	Princess; Ruru 蠕蠕公主	Gao Cheng 高澄 (521–549)	Kangti 库提 ?–553	Tiefa 铁伐 ?-552–553
Lu; Chidelian 郁久閭叱地連; 537–550	Wucheng of Northern Qi; 537–569	Gao Shi 高氏
□
Yujiulü Furen; Died on 29 November 586

== Other members ==
- Consort Yujiulü (died 452), formally Empress Gong, a consort of Tuoba Huang, a crown prince of the Northern Wei, and the mother of Emperor Wencheng.
- Lü Pi (闾毗) - Duke of Hedong (河东王), d. April 461.
- Yujiulü Ruowen (郁久閭若文) - Prince of Puyang, senior official at court of Emperor Wencheng of Northern Wei.
- Empress Yujiulü (525–540), formally Empress Dao (悼皇后), consort of Emperor Wen of Western Wei.

== Dissolution and legacy ==
Yujiulü clan lost its dominant power in steppe to Ashina tribe in 555. Surviving members of royal clan sinicized, changing their surnames to Lǘ (闾). Some of them even served Sui dynasty, such as Yujiulü Furen (d. 29 November 586). Chinese author Wang Anyi wrote that her mother Ru Zhijuan might be descended from Rouran.
