= Yujiulü Nagai =

Khagan of Rouran
- Reign: 492–506
- Predecessor: Yujiulü Doulun
- Successor: Yujiulü Futu
- Died: 506
- Issue: Yujiulü Futu; Yujiulü Dengshuzi
Era name and dates
- Tai'an (太安): 492–506
Regnal name
- Hóuqífúdàikùzhě Kèhán (侯其伏代庫者可汗); Kökibük Daiγuǰai Qaγan; Joyful Khagan
- House: Yujiulü clan
- Father: Yujiulü Tuhezhen
- Religion: Tengriism

Yujiulü Nagai (Chinese: 郁久閭那蓋 ; pinyin: Yùjiǔlǘ Nàgài) (?–506) was the ruler of the Rouran from 492 to 506 and had of the title of Houqifudaikuzhe Khagan (侯其伏代庫者可汗; Rouran: Kökibük Daiγuǰai Qaγan). He was the second son of Yujiulü Tuhezhen. According to Pengling Wang, his name might be cognate of the Middle Mongol Nogai (in Mongolian script:ᠨᠣᠬᠠᠢ; Khalkha:нохой nohoj), meaning "dog".

== Biography ==
=== Yujiulü Doulun's reign ===
Yujiulü Nagai and his nephew Khagan Yujiulü Doulun fought against Gaoche ruler Afuzhiluo (阿伏至羅) and his cousin Qiongqi (穷奇). In 487 Afuzhiluo, Qiongqi and their clans of over 100,000 yurts escaped from the pursuing armies Doulun and Nagai. While Doulun had limited success, Nagai won all his battles against the Gaoche.

=== Reign ===
In 492, he seized the position of khagan from Yujiulü Doulun thanks to a successful coup d'état by the Rouran's nobles. He later asked for physicians, craftsmans and artisans from Emperor Wu of Southern Qi, which was denied.

In 501, the King of Gaochang, Ma Ru (馬儒) was overthrown and killed, and the people of Gaochang appointed Qu Jia (麴嘉) as their king. Qu Jia hailed from the Zhong district of Jincheng commandery (金城, roughly corresponding to modern day Lanzhou, Gansu). Qu Jia at first pledged allegiance to the Rouran. That same year, having secured his borders, Nagai started raiding the northern borders of the Northern Wei.

In September 504, he led the 120,000 cavalry to the Northern Wei in six directions. He directly drove Woye Town (now northeast of Urad Front Banner, Inner Mongolia), Huaiyu Town (now southwest of Guyang County, Inner Mongolia) and went to Dai Commandery and Heng Commandery, however he was eventually stopped by Wei general Yuan Huai (源怀).

He died in 506 and was succeeded by Yujiulü Futu.

== Family ==
He had four sons including Futu and Dengshuzi both of whom became khagans.

== Sources ==
- History of the Northern Dynasties, vol. 86.
- Book of Wei, vol 103

Preceded by Yujiulü Doulun	Khagan of the Rouran; 492–506	Succeeded by Yujiulü Futu
