= Yujiulü Chounu =

Khagan of Rouran
- Reign: 508–520
- Predecessor: Yujiulü Futu
- Successor: Yujiulü Anagui
- Died: 520
Era name and dates
- Jianchang (建昌): 508–520
Regnal name
- Dòuluófúbádòufá Kèhán (豆羅伏跋豆伐可汗); Töröbüg Bodobar Qaγan; Illuminating Ruling Khagan
- House: Yujiulü clan
- Father: Yujiulü Futu
- Mother: Hou Luling (侯呂陵)
- Religion: Buddhism

Yujiulü Chounu (Chinese: 郁久閭醜奴; pinyin: Yùjiǔlǘ Chǒunú) (?–520) was the ruler of the Rouran from 508 to 520 and had the title of Douluofubadoufa Khagan (豆羅伏跋豆伐可汗; Rouran: Töröbüg Bodobar Qaγan).

== Biography ==
=== Reign ===
Yujiulü Chounu was the firstborn son of Khagan Yujiulü Futu and succeeded his father when he was killed in a battle against the Gaoche. This was when the Gaochang king Qu Jia (麴嘉) rebelled against the Rouran and resubmitted to Gaoche.

In the summer of 510 he sent the Wei court the Buddhist monk Hong Xuan (洪宣), who presented the Emperor Xuanwu with a statue inlaid with pearls. In return, Xuanwu decided to send General Ma Yishu (馬義舒) as an envoy in 514, however Xuanwu died soon after and the embassy was cancelled. This time Chounu switched sides and sent his envoy Qijin Bijian (俟斤比建) to the Liang dynasty that same year.

In 516, he marched on the Gaoche to avenge his father. This campaign was a success, the Gaoche leader Mietu was arrested and was towed to death by a horse. Moved by his success, he immediately sent his envoys Qijin Bijian, Hexi Wuiliba and Gong Guli (鞏顧礼) to the neighboring Northern Wei and Liang with gifts. A tribute composed of 700 slaves was sent to the Wei court in 519.

=== Family life and death ===
Soon, Chounu began having problems in family life. His infant brother Zuhui disappeared. The twenty-year-old shamaness Dauhun Diwan appeared, who announced that Zuhui was taken alive by spirits to heaven and could be returned. Chounu ordered a seven-day prayer service and, unexpectedly, Zuhui ran into his yurt and said he had been living in heaven for a year. Chounu was happy and ordered Diwan to divorce her husband Fusheng (he was given 3,000 horses and bulls) and made her his wife. Soon Chounu fell in love with her and ceased to deal with management affairs. When Zuhui grew up, Dowager Khatun Hou Luling (侯呂陵) found that the story of heaven had been invented by Diwan, and Zuhui had been in her yurt. Chouni did not believe this and soon Divan persuaded him to execute Zuhui. While Dowager Khatun Houluilin ordered his servants to strangle Dawhun Diwan. Moreover, unexpectedly, the Gaoche attacked and defeated the Rourans. Chounu decided to return to his headquarters and execute the murderers of his wife, but on the orders of his mother Chounu was executed by the princes as well, who put his younger brother Anagui on the throne in 520.

== Sources ==
- History of the Northern Dynasties, vol. 86.
- Book of Wei, vol. 103

| Preceded by Yujiulü Futu | Khagan of the Rouran; 508–520 | Succeeded by Yujiulü Anagui |
