= Yujiulü Futu =

Khagan of Rouran
- Reign: 506–508
- Predecessor: Yujiulü Nagai
- Successor: Yujiulü Chounu
- Died: 508
Era name and dates
- Shiping (始平): 506–508
Regnal name
- Tuóhàn Kèhán (佗汗可汗); Tāhàn Kèhán (他汗可汗); Taγan Qaγan; Successor Khagan
- House: Yujiulü clan
- Father: Yujiulü Nagai
- Religion: Tengriism

Yujiulü Futu (Chinese: 郁久閭伏圖; pinyin: Yùjiǔlǘ Fútú ) (died 508) was the khagan of the Rouran from 506 to 508 with the title of Tuohan Khagan (佗汗可汗) or Tahan Khagan (他汗可汗; Rouran: Taγan Qaγan). He was the first son of Yujiulü Nagai.

== Reign ==
Yujiulü Futu succeeded his father Yujiulü Nagai as khagan of the Rouran in 506. His first act was to send Hexi Wuiliba (紇奚勿六跋), a Rouran envoy to Emperor Xuanwu of Northern Wei to make peace. However, the Emperor ordered the ministers to convey to the ambassador that the Rouran were descendants of slaves, the and emperors only communicated with them out of mercy and the Rouran would soon lose their lands. Again in 507, Futu sent the Emperor a letter and sable fur. The Emperor replied that peace with the Northern Wei could be earned by fighting the Gaoche. However, this war proved disastrous as in 508 Futuwas killed in battle by the Gaoche ruler Mi'etu (彌俄突). He was succeeded by his son Yujiulü Chounu.

== Family ==
He had at least seven children:

- Yujiulü Chounu
- Yujiulü Qinifa (郁久閭俟匿伐)
- Yujiulü Anagui
- Yujiulü Zuhui (郁久閭祖惠)
- Yujiulü Yijufa (郁久閭乙居伐)
- Yujiulü Tahan (郁久閭塔寒) - married to Princess Huazheng (化政公主), daughter of a Northern Wei official Yuan Yi (元翌)
- Yujiulü Tutujia (郁久閭秃突佳)

== Sources ==
- History of the Northern Dynasties, vol. 86.
- Book of Wei, vol. 103
- Zhizhi Tongjian, vol. 159.

Preceded by Yujiulü Nagai	Khagan of the Rouran; 506–508	Succeeded by Yujiulü Chounu
