= Gao Yun (emperor) =

Gao Yun 高雲
- Heavenly royal

Ruler of Northern Yan
- Reign: September 16, 407 – November 6, 409
- Predecessor: Murong Sheng (Later Yan)
- Successor: Feng Ba
- Died: November 6, 409
Full name
- Family name: Originally Gāo (高), 397–407 Mùróng (慕容), changed back to Gāo in 407; Given name: Yún (雲)
Era name and dates
- Zhèngshǐ (正始): 407–409
Regnal name
- Heavenly royal (天皇)
Posthumous name
- Hùiyì (惠懿皇帝, "kind and benevolent")
- House: Gao (by birth); Murong (by adoption)
- Dynasty: Northern Yan or Later Yan

Gao Yun (Chinese: 高雲) (died 409), at one time Murong Yun (慕容雲), courtesy name Ziyu (子雨), also known by his posthumous name as Huiyi of Later/Northern Yan (後/北燕惠懿), was either briefly the ruler of the Later Yan state or the founding ruler of Northern Yan state, depending on the historian's characterization. He was a descendant of the royal house of Goguryeo (Gaogouli), whose ancestors were captured by the Former Yan state. He was adopted into the Later Yan imperial house after helping Murong Bao put down a rebellion by Murong Bao's son Murong Hui. Gao Yun became emperor after the people rebelled against the despotic rule of his adoptive uncle Murong Xi (Emperor Zhaowen), and during his reign, he used the title "Heavenly royal". In 409, he and all Gao Yun's kids were killed, and after a disturbance, was replaced by his ethnic Han general Feng Ba (Emperor Wencheng).

== Early life ==
Gao Yun's ancestors were from the Goguryeo royal house. When Murong Huang defeated Goguryeo forces and temporarily occupied its capital Hwando, he took many members of the Goguryeo royal house captive and moved them to Qingshan (青山, in modern Jinzhou, Liaoning), and their descendants became Former Yan and Later Yan subjects.

As of 397, Gao Yun was a mid-level official in the administration of Murong Bao (Emperor Huimin), when Murong Bao, under military pressure by Northern Wei, abandoned the capital Zhongshan (中山, in modern Baoding, Hebei) and sought to take refuge at the old Former Yan capital of Longcheng (龍城, also in Jinzhou). On the way, his son Murong Hui, resentful that his younger brother Murong Ce (慕容策) was made crown prince over him, rebelled, and while Murong Bao was able to reach Longcheng, Murong Hui put Longcheng under siege. During one night, Gao Yun led about 100 soldiers and made a surprise attack on Murong Hui's camp, causing Murong Hui's army to collapse. Murong Hui fled to Zhongshan and was killed there. For Gao Yun's contributions, Murong Bao made him the Duke of Xiyang and adopted him as his own son, and so his name was changed to Murong Yun. It was around this time that he befriended another general, Feng Ba, as Murong Yun was not looked upon favorably by others because he was a man of few words, but Feng Ba saw that he had wisdom and tolerance.

Little is known about Murong Yun's life in the next few years. By 406, he was a major general under the reign of Murong Bao's cruel and arbitrary younger brother Murong Xi (Emperor Zhaowen), when, at the instigation of Murong Xi's wife Empress Fu Xunying, Murong Xi made a disastrous attack on Goguyreo in which many soldiers died not from battle but from exposure to the cold. Murong Yun himself suffered an arrow wound during the battle, and, because he feared Murong Xi's cruelty, used this as an excuse to resign his post and remain at home.

In summer 407, Empress Fu died. Murong Xi mourned her so much that he ordered that a magnificent tomb be built for her. The officials were all forced to weep for Empress Fu, with those who could not shed tears punished severely, so they put spicy food in their mouths to stimulate tear production. Eventually, Murong Xi accompanied Empress Fu's funeral procession out of Longcheng.

After Murong Xi left Longcheng, Feng Ba and his brother Feng Sufu (馮素弗), who had hidden themselves since Murong Xi had previously wanted to have them executed, conspired with their cousin Feng Wani (馮萬泥) to start a rebellion. They did so with the help of the general Zhang Xing (張興) and those who had previously conspired with the general Fu Jin (苻進) in a failed coup attempt earlier that year. Because Feng Ba was friendly with Murong Yun, he persuaded Murong Yun to become their leader, and they quickly captured the palace and closed the city gates. Murong Yun was declared the Heavenly King.

Murong Xi returned to Longcheng and settled in outside his estate of Longteng Chateau (龍騰苑), preparing an assault on the city. At this time, the imperial guard soldier Chu Tou (褚頭) fled to him and informed him that the imperial guards were ready to turn against Murong Yun as soon as Murong Xi attacked. However, for reasons unknown, Murong Xi panicked at this news and fled. His general, Murong Ba (慕容拔), tried to maintain the assault against Longcheng and was initially successful, but as the troops began to realize that Murong Xi had fled, they collapsed, and Murong Ba was killed by Feng Ba's soldiers.

Later that day, Murong Xi was found, wearing civilian clothes, in a forest, and he was captured and delivered to Murong Yun. Murong Yun personally read him his crimes, and then beheaded him and his sons.

== Reign ==
After Murong Xi's death, Murong Yun reassumed his original family name Gao. Being insecure about how he felt he had little contributions to the people or to his own place on the throne, he employed many skillful guards to protect him. He further began to favor two jesters named Li Ban (離班) and Tao Ren (桃仁), to have Li and Tao be in charge of security. He awarded them with great wealth, and their foods and clothes could match those of Gao Yun himself. As far as the government was concerned, important matters were largely in the hands of Feng Ba and his brothers Feng Sufu, Feng Ruchen (馮乳陳), and Feng Hong and cousins Feng Wani, as well as Sun Hu (孫護) and Wu Yinti (務銀提).

In 408, Gao Yun made his wife, Lady Li, empress, and he made his son, Gao Pengcheng (高彭城), crown prince. He also buried Murong Xi and Empress Fu with imperial honors. It was also around this time that Gwanggaeto the Great, king of Goguryeo, sent messengers to him to try to establish peaceful relations as well as to ascertain the relationship between Gao Yun and the current Goguryeo royal line. Gao Yun also sent messengers to Goguryeo to affirm the relationship. He made Murong Gui (慕容歸) the Duke of Liaodong and had Murong Gui be in charge of continuing the worship of the Murong ancestors.

In winter 409, Gao Yun was assassinated—an event that is mysterious in its cause and scope. Traditional histories, including the Jin Shu and the Zizhi Tongjian, record that Li and Tao, despite Gao Yun's favors to them, were still not satisfied, and they assassinated Gao Yun out of that dissatisfaction. Yet, this does not appear to be a true reason for the assassination. Gao Yun's wife Empress Li appears to have also died in the incident. Feng Ba, upon hearing of the assassination, readied his troops and waited for the situation to become clear, but two of his soldiers, Zhang Tai (張泰) and Li Sang (李桑), advanced into the palace and beheaded Li and Tao. The officials all supported Feng Ba to take the throne, and so he did. (No reference was made to Gao Yun's son Gao Pengcheng.) Feng Ba later buried Gao Yun and Empress Li with imperial honors—but curiously used Gao Yun's name in the edict, without deference to naming taboo.

== Popular culture ==
- Portrayed by Kim Seung-soo in the 2011-2012 KBS1 TV series Gwanggaeto, The Great Conqueror.

== Personal information ==
- Wife
  - Empress Li (created 408, d. 409?)
- Children
  - Gao Pengcheng (高彭城), the Crown Prince (created 408)

Emperor Huiyi of (Northern) Yan House of Murong Died: 409
Regnal titles
Preceded by Murong Xi as Emperor of Later Yan	Emperor of Northern Yan; 407–409	Succeeded by Feng Ba
Titles in pretence
Preceded by Murong Xi	— TITULAR — Emperor of China; 407–409; Reason for succession failure: Sixteen Kingdoms	Succeeded by Feng Ba
