= Yujiulü Yucheng =

Khagan of Rouran
- Reign: 464–485
- Predecessor: Yujiulü Tuhezhen
- Successor: Yujiulü Doulun
- Died: 485
- Issue: Yujiulü Doulun
Era name and dates
- Yongkang (永康): 464–485
Regnal name
- Shòuluóbùzhēn Kèhán (受羅部真可汗); Soyulabčin Qaγan; Gracious Khagan
- House: Yujiulü clan
- Father: Yujiulü Tuhezhen
- Religion: Tengriism

Yujiulü Yucheng (Chinese: 郁久閭予成; pinyin: Yùjiǔlǘ Yúchéng) (?–485) was ruler of the Rouran (464–485) with the title of Shouluobuzhen Khagan (受羅部真可汗; Rouran: Soyulabčin Qaγan). He was the first Rouran ruler to adopt a Chinese style era name, which was Yongkang (永康 Yǒngkāng 464–484). He was the elder son of Yujiulü Tuhezhen.

== Reign ==
Yujiulü Yucheng at first sought peaceful relations with Chinese states. He sent tribute to Liu Song in 468 and 471. More tribute composed of Kumo Xi and Khitan slaves were sent to the Northern Wei in February and July 469. He continued his father's campaign against the Tarim Base states the following year. During a campaign against Khotan in 470, the Khotanese king wrote a letter to Emperor Xianwen of Northern Wei that all of the statelets in the west had submitted to the Rouran and asked for assistance. This brought the Rouran against Northern Wei.

In February 472 and 473, Yucheng attacked the Northern Wei across the western border, targeting Dunhuang. He tried to reconcile with Wei by asking a hand of a princess in 475. However, Wei court refused it, citing frequent raids of Rouran into their territory. Yucheng sent further tribute to the Northern Wei in 476 and 477.

However, in 478, Yucheng used the fall of Liu Song to attack Wei. He met with Wang Hongfan (王洪范), an envoy of Xiao Daocheng, made an alliance, and sent 300,000 troops to attack the Northern Wei. He made another alliance in 473, this time with Jangsu of Goguryeo with the goal of keeping the Northern Wei under control. Allied Rouran-Korean armies crushed the Didouyu Khitans in 479.

He attacked the Northern Wei again in December 485, Emperor Xiaowen's cousin Yuan Cheng, (元澄) Prince of Rencheng was sent in front of the Chinese forces to resist. By the time of his death later that year, Yucheng had restored the kaghanate to a status even more powerful than the times of Datan. He was succeeded by his son Yujiulü Doulun.

== Sources ==
- History of the Northern Dynasties, vol. 86.
- Book of Wei, vol 103.

Preceded by Yùjiǔlǘ Tǔhèzhēn	Khagan of the Rouran; 450–485	Succeeded by Yùjiǔlǘ Dòulún
