= Yujiulü Doulun =

Khagan of Rouran
- Reign: 485–492
- Predecessor: Yujiulü Yucheng
- Successor: Yujiulü Nagai
- Died: 492
Era name and dates
- Taiping (太平): 485–492
Regnal name
- Fúgǔdūn Kèhán (伏古敦可汗); Böködün Qaγan; Constant Khagan
- House: Yujiulü clan
- Father: Yujiulü Yucheng
- Religion: Tengriism

Yujiulü Doulan (Chinese: 郁久閭豆崙 ; pinyin: Yùjiǔlǘ Dòulún) (?–492) was khagan of the Rouran (485–492) with the title of Fugudun Khagan (伏古敦可汗; Rouran: Böködün Qaγan). He was the son of Yujiulü Yucheng.

== Reign ==
Yujiulü Doulun succeeded his father as khagan of the Rouran in 485. His reign saw the resumption of raids on the Northern Wei border but did not bring visible results. In Chinese sources, the years of his reign are called the "period of mercy", but at this time in the khaganate there were frequent destructive wars between high ranking nobles. When nobles asked Doulun to make peace with Wei, he accused them of treason and ordered them to be executed, together with whole clans and up to three tribes.

Doulun and his uncle Nagai were defeated by Gaoche ruler Afuzhiluo (阿伏至羅) and his younger cousin Qiongqi (穷奇) in 487. In 488, he invaded Yiwu with 3,000 soldiers and returned to the steppes. The eastern wing of the Rouran fell into Khitan and Kumo Xi hands in 490.

Starting from 492, Doulun's cruelty and losses in battles made his nobles to grow distressful. They persuaded Nagai to be the khagan. Nagai initially refused and said that Doulun was a legal khagan until death. This was a signal for the nobles who killed Doulun and his mother in a coup d'état, brought their corpses to Nagai and subsequently proclaimed him khagan.

== Sources ==
- History of the Northern Dynasties, vol. 86.
- Book of Wei, vol 103.

| Preceded by Yùjiǔlǘ Yúchéng | Khagan of the Rouran; 485–492 | Succeeded by Yùjiǔlǘ Nàgài |
