= Yujiulü Shelun =

Khagan of Rouran
- Reign: 402–410
- Coronation: 11 March 402
- Predecessor: Yujiulü Yungueti
- Successor: Yujiulü Hulü
- Died: May 410
Regnal name
- Qiudoufa Khagan (丘豆伐可汗); Kutba Qaγan; Controlling and spreading khagan
- House: Yujiulü clan
- Father: Yujiulü Yungueti
- Religion: Tengriism

Yujiulü Shelun (Chinese: 郁久閭社崙, Simplified Chinese: 郁久闾社仑; pinyin: Yùjiǔlǘ Shèlún, Wade–Giles: Yü-chiu-lü She-lun) (c. 391–410) or Qiudoufa Khagan (丘豆伐可汗; Rouran: Kutba Qaγan) was khagan of the Rouran from 402 to 410.

== Early years ==
After his brother Heduohan (曷多汗) was defeated and killed by the Northern Wei general Zhangsun Fei (長孫肥), Shelun fled to west in 394, breaking ties with Wei. He found refuge with his uncle Yujiulü Pihouba (郁久闾匹候跋) and cousins. However, they were unhappy about his growing power, which forced Shelun to quickly gather his supporters and capture the sons of Pihouba. Soon, Shelun killed Pihouba, and his sons fled to Wei. Shelun, afraid of the empire seeking revenge, migrated north through the Gobi, uniting nomadic tribes on his way.

== Reign ==
Shelun led retaliatory raids against Northern Wei, but suffered a serious defeat in 399 and was forced to flee westward. There he subjugated the Hulu (斛律) tribe and with an aid of a Hulu called Chiluohou (叱洛侯) he defeated the Tiele, then declared himself khagan. Shelun was the first major leader of the steppes to adopt the title of Qiudoufa Khagan (丘豆伐可汗) which was originally a title used by Xianbei nobles. He reorganized military-administrative system, modeling it after the Xiongnu, divided the army into hundreds and thousands.

In order to strengthen his position, he allied Yao Xing, emperor of the Later Qin. He aided the Later Qin against Emperor Daowu of Northern Wei in 403. On one occasion, the horses sent as tribute to Qin were seized by Helian Bobo in 407. He continued to raid the Northern Wei in 407 and 409. In one of these battles in 410, Emperor Mingyuan sent one of his advisors, Baba Song, (拔拔嵩) Duke of Nanping to attack the Rouran, and when Baba was surrounded by Shelun's troops, Emperor Mingyuan personally led an army to relieve Baba. Shelun died of his wounds in May 410 and was succeeded by his brother Yujiulü Hulü, because his sons Duba (度拔) and Sheba (社拔) were still young.

== Personality and achievements ==
Shelun was described as "vicious/cruel, wily/artful, and possesses adaptability" in the Book of Wei. He has been described as a "talented politician" and an autocratic leader by modern scholars, known for his cruelty, cunning and adaptability. He revolutionized the military and public organisation of Rouran (for example, introducing compulsory military recruitment and establishing strict rules of behavior for the warriors, and punishment for those who broke them), introduced a decimal system, overwhelmed and united many Mongolian and Turkic tribes, broke all of Rouran's vassalages, and was the first to take the title of khagan.

== Bibliography ==
- Klein, Kenneth Douglas (1980). The Contributions of the Fourth Century Xianbei States to the Reunification of the Chinese Empire. Los Angeles: California University Press.

== Sources ==
- Book of Wei, vol. 103

Preceded by Yujiulü Yungueti	Khagan of the Rouran; 402–410	Succeeded by Yujiulü Hulü
