= Feng Ba =

Emperor Wencheng of Northern Yan 北燕文成帝
- Heavenly King of Great Yan

Ruler of Northern Yan
- Reign: 409 – 430
- Predecessor: Gao Yun
- Successor: Feng Hong
- Died: 430
- Burial: Changgu Mausoleum (長谷陵)
Full name
- Family name: Féng (馮); Given name: Bá (跋)
Era name and dates
- Tàipíng (太平): 409–430
Regnal name
- Heavenly King of Great Yan (大燕天王)
Posthumous name
- Emperor Wénchéng (文成皇帝, "civil and successful")
Temple name
- Tàizǔ (太祖)
- House: Feng
- Dynasty: Northern Yan

Feng Ba (Chinese: 馮跋; died 430), courtesy name Wenqi (文起), Xianbei nickname Qizhifa (乞直伐), also known by his posthumous name as the Emperor Wencheng of Northern Yan (北燕文成帝), was either the founding or second (Note: This is dependent on the status of Gao Yun (Emperor Huiyi) according to the historian's characterization.) ruler of the Northern Yan dynasty of China. He became monarch after Gao Yun (Emperor Huiyi), whom he supported in a 407 coup that overthrew Murong Xi (Emperor Zhaowen), was assassinated in 409. During his reign, the Northern Yan largely maintained its territorial integrity but made no headway against the much stronger rival Northern Wei dynasty. He was said to have had more than 100 sons, but after his death in 430, his brother and successor Feng Hong (Emperor Zhaocheng) had them all executed.

== Family background and early life ==
Feng Ba's grandfather Feng He (馮和) was ethnically Han Chinese and was said to have settled down in Shangdang Commandery (上黨, roughly modern Changzhi, Shanxi) in the aftermaths of the conquest of the northern half of Jin during the reign of Emperor Huai of Jin by Han-Zhao. Feng Ba's father Feng An (馮安) later served the Western Yan emperor Murong Yong as a general. When Western Yan was destroyed by the Later Yan emperor Murong Chui in 394, Feng An's household was forcibly moved to Helong (和龍, also known as Longcheng (龍城), in modern Jinzhou, Liaoning), where Feng Ba grew up, apparently under heavy Xianbei influence, for his nickname Qizhifa suggested Xianbei origin. He had three younger brothers, all of whom admired heroic behavior and largely ignored social restraints, but Feng Ba himself was considered to be careful and diligent, managing his household well. During Murong Bao's reign, he became a general. He came to respect Murong Bao's adoptive son Murong Yun the Duke of Zhaoyang, and they became great friends.

Later, in 407, during the reign of Murong Bao's cruel and capricious younger brother Murong Xi, both Feng Ba and his brother Feng Sufu (馮素弗) somehow offended Murong Xi, and they hid themselves in the countryside. They concluded that they would eventually be found and killed, and therefore resolved to overthrow Murong Xi. They reentered Longcheng, then the capital, in secret, and when Murong Xi left Longcheng to bury his wife Empress Fu Xunying, who had died earlier that year, they rose within the city with the assistance of their cousin Feng Wani (馮萬泥) and the generals Sun Hu (孫護) and Zhang Xing (張興). Because Feng Ba and Murong Yun were friends, he persuaded Murong Yun to serve as their leader, and they quickly captured the palace and closed the city gates. Murong Yun was then declared Heavenly King.

Murong Xi returned to Longcheng and settled in outside, at Longteng Chateau, preparing an assault on the city. At this time, an imperial guard, Chu Tou (褚頭), fled to him and informed him that the imperial guards were ready to turn against Murong Yun as soon as Murong Xi attacked. However, for reasons unknown, Murong Xi panicked at this news and fled. His general Murong Ba (慕容拔) tried to maintain the assault against Longcheng and was initially successful, but as the troops began to realize that Murong Xi had fled, their morale collapsed, and Murong Ba was killed by Feng Ba's soldiers. Later that day, Murong Xi was found wearing civilian clothes in a forest, and he was captured and delivered to Murong Yun. Murong Yun personally read him his crimes and then beheaded him and his sons.

== During Gao Yun's reign ==
Because Feng Ba was instrumental in his becoming emperor, Murong Yun, who soon after he became emperor changed his name back to the original Gao Yun, made Feng Ba his prime minister, and Feng Ba's brothers and cousin Feng Wani, as well as other members of the uprising, received high posts as well. Effectively, the government was in Feng Ba's hands.

Because Gao Yun was insecure about how he felt he had little contributions to the people or to his own place on the throne, he employed many skillful guards to protect him. He further began to favor two jesters named Li Ban (離班) and Tao Ren (桃仁), to have Li and Tao be in charge of security. He awarded them with great wealth, and their foods and clothes could match those of Gao Yun himself. Despite this, he was assassinated in winter 409—an event that is mysterious in its cause and scope. Traditional histories, including the Jin Shu and the Zizhi Tongjian, record that Li and Tao, despite Gao Yun's favors to them, were still not satisfied, and they assassinated Gao Yun out of that dissatisfaction. Yet, this does not appear to be a true reason for the assassination. Gao Yun's wife Empress Li appears to have also died in the incident. Feng Ba, upon hearing of the assassination, readied his troops and waited for the situation to become clear, but two of his soldiers Zhang Tai (張泰) and Li Sang (李桑) advanced into the palace and beheaded Li and Tao. The officials all supported Feng Ba to take the throne, and so he did. (No reference was made to Gao Yun's son Gao Pengcheng.) (Some historians consider Gao Yun as the first emperor of Northern Yan and consider Feng Ba its second emperor, while some consider Gao Yun as the last emperor of Later Yan and Feng Ba as Northern Yan's first emperor.)

== Reign ==
Feng Ba made his brother Feng Sufu the Duke of Fanyang the prime minister, and other important posts went to Sun Hu, Zhang Xing, his brother Feng Hong the Duke of Ji, his cousin Feng Wani the Duke of Guangchuan, and another cousin's son Feng Ruchen (馮乳陳) the Duke of Shanggu. He designated his mother Lady Zhang (張太后, personal name unknown) princess dowager (rather than empress dowager, the customary title bestowed by Heavenly Kings of the Sixteen Kingdoms period), and he created his wife Lady Sun as princess and his son Feng Yong (馮永) as crown prince. Both Feng Ba and Feng Sufu were considered diligent, frugal, and intelligent, and during this period, Northern Yan was considered well-governed, being able to fend off the much stronger rival Northern Wei.

In 410, Feng Ba had to deal with a major internal disturbance. Feng Wani and Feng Ruchen both felt that they contributed much to Feng Ba's success, and therefore were resentful that they were not at Longcheng and in control of the imperial government but were required to serve as commanding generals at the cities of Feiru (肥如, in modern Qinhuangdao, Hebei) and Bailang (白狼, in modern Zhaoyang, Liaoning). They therefore rose in rebellion together. Feng Ba sent Feng Hong and Zhang Xing to attack them, and after they were defeated by Feng Hong and Zhang, they surrendered, but Feng Hong executed them regardless.

That year, Feng Ba buried Gao Yun and Gao Yun's wife Empress Li with imperial honors, but curiously used Gao Yun's name in the edict regarding burial, without observing naming taboo.

In 411, the khan of Rouran, Yujiulü Hulü offered a tribute of 3,000 horses to Feng Ba and requested to marry Feng Ba's daughter Princess Lelang. (Princess Lelang was probably the daughter of Feng Ba's wife Princess Sun, as Feng Sufu suggested refusing the request and sending the daughter of one of Feng Ba's concubines instead.) Feng Ba, believing that an alliance with Rouran would be beneficial to his state, gave Princess Lelang in marriage to Yujiulü Hulü.

In 414, Feng Ba sent his official Chu Kuang (褚匡) to his ancestral home of Changle (長樂, in modern Hengshui, Hebei) to find his clan members, and Chu Kuang returned with 5,000 households, headed by Feng Ba's cousins Feng Mai (馮買) and Feng Du (馮睹). Feng Ba also found his brother Feng Pi (馮丕) in Goguryeo and welcomed him back, creating him the Duke of Changshan.

Later that year, Yujiulü Hulü, who was about to in turn marry one of his daughters to Feng Ba, was overthrown by his nephew Yujiulü Buluzhen (郁久閭步鹿真), and the coup leaders sent him and his daughter to Northern Yan. Feng Ba treated him as an honored guest and, as originally planned, took his daughter, Zhaoyi (昭仪), as a concubine. Yujiulü Hulü requested that Feng Ba send an army to escort him home, and Feng Ba, with some reluctance, sent his general Wan Ling (萬陵) to escort Yujiulü Hulü, but Wan killed Yujiulü Hulü on the way and returned. Instead, Feng Ba entered into an alliance with the new khan Yujiulü Datan, who had in turn overthrown Yujiulü Buluzhen.

Later that year, Emperor Mingyuan of Northern Wei sent a messenger, Huniuyu Shimen (忽忸于什門), to try to negotiate peace with Northern Yan, but when Huniuyu arrived at Helong, he refused to enter the Northern Yan palace, demanding that Feng Ba come out of his palace and accept Emperor Mingyuan's edict (as a sign of submission). Feng Ba refused and dragged Huniuyu into the palace. Huniuyu refused to bow, and Feng Ba had his guards press Huniuyu's head down, and then imprisoned him. Later, on several occasions, Huniuyu insulted Feng Ba, but Feng Ba overruled suggestions to have him executed, stating that Huniuyu was just being faithful to his state. He later tried several times to have Huniuyu submit, but Huniuyu each time refused. Feng Ba, instead, entered into an alliance with the Xia emperor Helian Bobo.

Around the new year 415, Feng Sufu died. Contrary to the usual customs of mourning a subject at most three times, he mourned his brother seven times.

Later in 415, Sun Hu's brothers Sun Boren (孫伯仁), Sun Chizhi (孫叱支), and Sun Yiba (孫乙拔), dissatisfied with the lack of promotions, complained. Feng Ba executed the three and promoted Sun Hu to try to pacify him, but Sun Hu became depressed, so Feng Ba poisoned him to death. Meanwhile, the general Wu Yinti (務銀提) was also unhappy that he was not promoted and planned to offer his defense post to Goguryeo, and Feng Ba executed him.

In 416, the Northern Yan general Kuruguan Bin (庫傉官斌), who had earlier defected from Northern Yan to Northern Wei but then defected back to Northern Yan, was attacked by Northern Wei's Emperor Mingyuan, and Northern Wei forces killed not only Kuruguan Bin, but also two other Northern Yan generals, Kuruguan Chang (庫傉官昌) and Kuruguan Ti (庫傉官提), probably relatives of Kuruguan Bin.

In 418, Northern Wei's Emperor Mingyuan made a surprise attack against Northern Yan, surrounding and sieging Helong. Feng Ba defended the city against Northern Wei attack and held it. Northern Wei forces seized some 10,000 households from Northern Yan and withdrew.

During the next few years, Northern Wei concentrated its efforts against Liu Song and Xia, and there did not appear to be major confrontations again between Northern Wei and Northern Yan.

In 426, Feng Ba's crown prince Feng Yong died, and he created another son, Feng Yi (馮翼), crown prince.

In 430, Feng Ba was seriously ill, and he issued an edict transferring his authorities to Feng Yi. However, Feng Ba's favorite concubine Consort Song wanted to have her son Feng Shouju (馮受居) inherit the throne, and therefore told Feng Yi that Feng Ba would soon recover and that he should not be so anxious to take over authority; Feng Yi agreed and retreated to his palace. Consort Song then falsely issued orders in Feng Ba's name cutting off communications with the outside, and Feng Yi and Feng Ba's other sons, as well as imperial officials, were not allowed to see Feng Ba. Only one of her trusted officials, Hu Fu (胡福), was able to enter the palace to be in charge of security. However, Hu was secretly resentful of Consort Song's ambitions, and he informed Feng Hong, who was prime minister in this point, of her intentions. Feng Hong immediately attacked the palace and seized control of it. Feng Ba, hearing this, died in shock. Feng Hong then took the throne himself and, after defeating Feng Yi's troops, killed all of Feng Ba's sons.

== Personal information ==
- Father
  - Feng An (馮安), Western Yan general
- Mother
  - Lady Zhang
- Wife
  - Princess Sun (created 409)
- Major Concubines
  - Consort Song, mother of Prince Shouju
  - Yujiulü Zhaoyi (郁久闾昭仪), daughter of Yujiulü Hulü, Khan Aidougai of Rouran (married 414)
- Children
  - Feng Yong (馮永), the Crown Prince (created 409, d. 426)
  - Feng Yi (馮翼), the Crown Prince (created 426, killed by Feng Hong 430)
  - Feng Shouju (馮受居) (killed by Feng Hong 430)
  - Princess Lelang, wife of Yujiulü Hulü, Khan Aidougai of Rouran (married 411)

== Popular culture ==
- Portrayed by Jung Ho-keun in the 2011-2012 KBS1 TV series Gwanggaeto, The Great Conqueror.

== Notes ==
Emperor Wencheng of (Northern) Yan House of Feng Died: 430
Regnal titles
Preceded by Gao Yun	Emperor of Northern Yan; 409–430	Succeeded by Feng Hong
Titles in pretence
Preceded by Gao Yun	— TITULAR — Emperor of China; 409–430; Reason for succession failure: Sixteen Kingdoms	Succeeded by Feng Hong
