= Northern Yan =

State from Sixteen Kingdoms era of China

Yan 燕
- 407–436
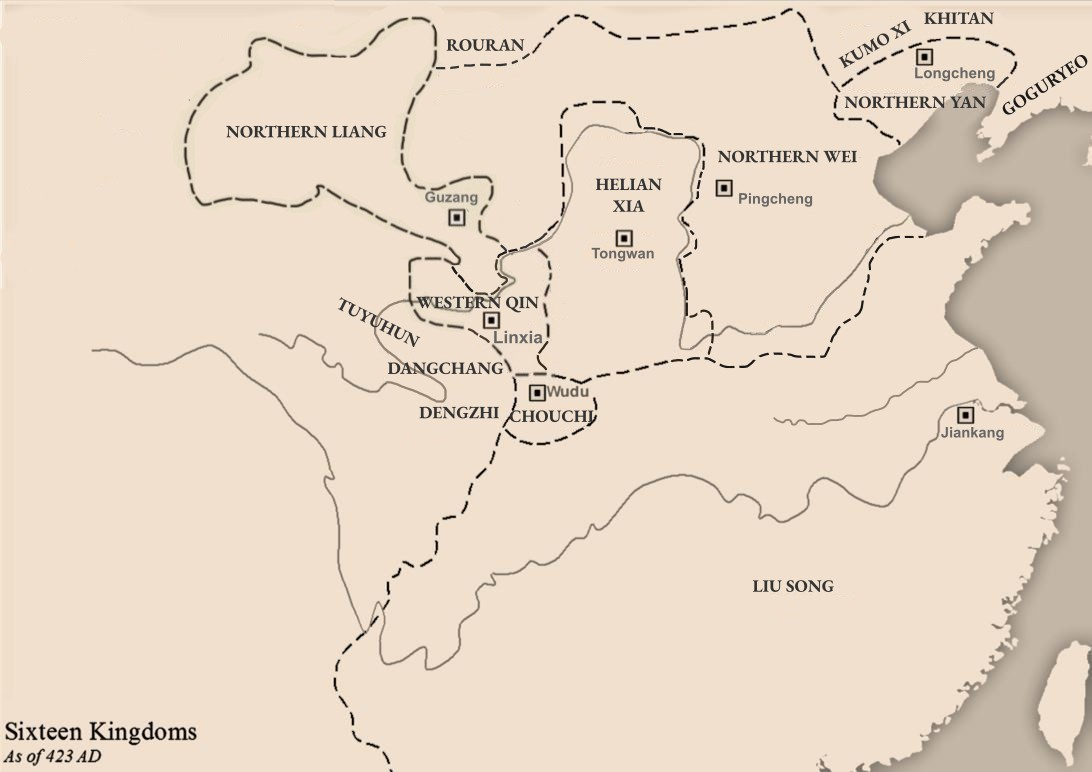
- Northern Yan, c. 423
- Capital: Longcheng
- Government: Monarchy
- Tian Wang
  - 407–409: Murong Yun
  - 409–430: Feng Ba
  - 430–436: Feng Hong
- History
  - Established: 15 September 407 407
  - Feng Ba's claiming of the throne: 6 November 409
  - Disestablished: 4 June 436 436
  - Feng Hong's death: 438
Preceded by	Succeeded by
Later Yan	Northern Wei; Goguryeo
- Today part of: China

Yan, known in historiography as the Northern Yan (Chinese: 北燕; pinyin: Běi Yān; 407 or 409–436), Eastern Yan (simplified Chinese: 东燕; traditional Chinese: 東燕; pinyin: Dōng Yān) or Huanglong (simplified Chinese: 黄龙; traditional Chinese: 黃龍), was a dynastic state of China during the era of Sixteen Kingdoms. Some historians consider Gao Yun, a member of the Goguryeo royal family, to be the first Northern Yan monarch, while others consider Feng Ba of Han ethnicity to be the founder.

All rulers of the Northern Yan took the title of Tiān Wáng (Heavenly King). The Northern Yan inherited what was left of the preceding Later Yan regime, whose territory occupied western Liaoning and parts of northeastern Hebei. In historiography, they are given the prefix of "Northern" to distinguish it with the contemporaneous Southern Yan, and unlike the Later Yan, their capital remained at Longcheng in the north throughout their existence.

== History ==
=== Background ===
Gao Yun was a descendant of the Goguryeo royal family. When the Former Yan captured the Goguryeo capital, Hwando in 342, they also captured several members of the royal family and moved them to Qingshan (青山, in modern Jinzhou, Liaoning), where Gao Yun was born and grew to become a minor general under the Later Yan. In 397, Gao Yun helped the Yan emperor, Murong Bao quell the rebellion of his son, Murong Hui. As a reward, Bao adopted him as his own son, changing his name to Murong Yun.

It was around this time when Murong Yun became friends with the general, Feng Ba. Feng Ba was a Han Chinese whose family was originally from Changle Commandery before his grandfather, Feng He (馮和) moved to Shangdang during the Disaster of Yongjia. Ba's father, Feng An (馮安) served as a military general under the Western Yan. After Later Yan conquered Western Yan in 394, the Feng clan resettled in Longcheng. Feng Ba appeared to have grown up under heavy Xianbei influence, as his nickname Qizhifa (乞直伐) suggests Xianbei origin.

In 401, Murong Yun's adoptive uncle, Murong Xi came to power, and he was described in records as a cruel and arbitrary ruler. Feng Ba and his brother, Feng Sufu were charged with crimes against Xi, forcing them to flee to the countryside where they were determined to overthrow him. In 407, as Murong Xi was holding a funeral for Empress Fu, Feng Ba and his conspirators took control of the capital Longcheng and acclaimed Murong Yun as their leader. Xi initially led an assault on Longcheng but then fled the battle alone in panic. After his forces collapsed, Xi was later found and executed by Yun.

=== Reign of Gao Yun and Feng Ba ===
The founding year of the Northern Yan is up to debate; some historians consider Feng Ba as the first ruler of Northern Yan while others assert that it was Gao Yun. The reason is that Gao Yun was a member of the Later Yan imperial family as Murong Bao's adopted son, and so he should be considered the last ruler of Later Yan. On the other hand, he was ethnically Goguryeo and reverted to his old family name shortly after ascending. Thus, Northern Yan's founding year can either be 407 or 409.

Gao Yun took the title of Heavenly King. The Later Yan was previously at war with Goguryeo, but Yun managed to establish friendly relations between them and Northern Yan. However, conflict with the Northern Wei also began as the Yan Inspector of You Province, Murong Yi (慕容懿) defected to Wei. Worried by his lack of reputation, Yun attempted to protect himself by empowering his favourites, but in 409, two of them, Li Ban (離班) and Tao Ren (桃仁) assassinated him. Feng Ba's men then had the assassins killed, and the officials acclaimed him as the new Heavenly King.

The Northern Yan was relatively weak compared to Northern Wei, so Feng Ba formed good relations with the Eastern Jin, Hu Xia, Rouran, Khitan and Kumo Xi. He secured the support of his people by actively participating in politics, promoting agriculture and reducing tax burdens. However, he was also wary of handing out higher offices to his retainers, which led to a rebellion by his cousins in 410. On two occasions, Feng Ba had Wei envoys detained. In 416 and 418, Wei clashed with Yan, but due to pressure from stronger neighbours like the Hu Xia, they were unable to launch any substantial campaign throughout Feng Ba's reign. Northern Yan also continued Later Yan's dual administrative system between their Han Chinese and "Hu" subjects, as Feng Ba appointed his Crown Prince as the Grand Chanyu to supervise the tribes, along with introducing other offices to assist the Grand Chanyu.

=== Decline and fall ===
Feng Ba became deathly ill in 430. Conflict arose between his Crown Prince, Feng Yi (馮翼) and favourite concubine, Consort Song (宋夫人), who wanted her own son to inherit the throne. The situation soon leaked to Feng Ba's brother, the Prime Minister Feng Hong, who led his troops and took over the capital. Feng Ba died soon after, and Feng Hong took the throne for himself, slaughtering all of Feng Ba's sons including Feng Yi.

At the time, the Wei had dealt with the Hu Xia threat in the west and began focusing on conquering Northern Yan. From 432 onwards, Yan faced periodic attacks from Wei. In 433, a succession issue led to Feng Hong's sons handing over Liaoxi Commandery to Wei. Feng Hong refused to surrender and attempted to secure his position by allying with the Liu Song dynasty, even becoming a vassal to them in 435, but Wei continued their assault nonetheless. Finally, a major Wei invasion in 436 prompted Feng Hong to flee to Goguryeo for protection, ending the Northern Yan.

Feng Hong remained in Goguryeo until 438. While the Goguryeo king, Jangsu initially refused to hand him over to Wei, Feng Hong repeatedly offended him and tried to escape to Liu Song, resulting in Jangsu executing him and his sons. In Northern Wei, Feng Ba's granddaughter grew to become Empress Dowager Feng, an important figure in Wei's history. In 1965, the tomb of Feng Sufu was discovered in Beipiao, Liaoning, which contained the earliest extant of the double stirrup along with a unique duck-shaped glassware.

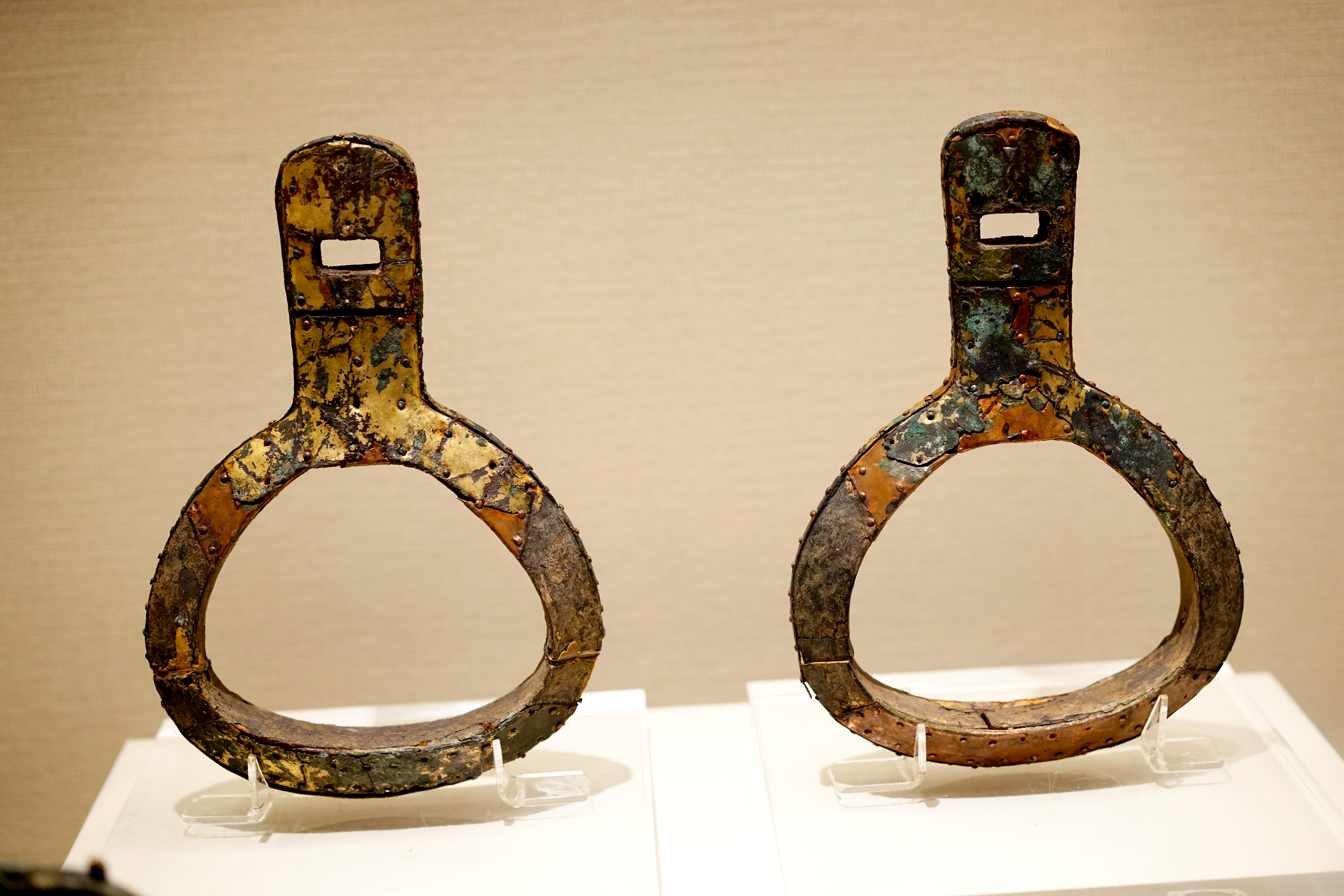
The earliest extant double stirrup.

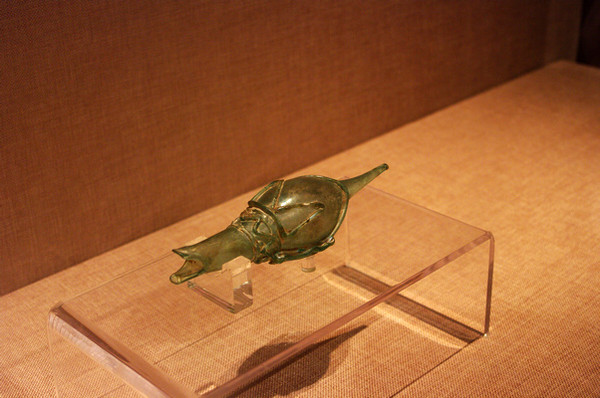
Duck-shaped glassware.

== Rulers of the Northern Yan ==
Temple name	Posthumous name	Personal name	Durations of reign	Era name
Unknown	Huiyi (惠懿)	Murong Yun^{1} or Gao Yun^{1}	407–409	Zhengshi (正始) 407–409
Taizu (太祖)	Wencheng (文成)	Feng Ba	409–430	Taiping (太平) 409–430
–	Zhaocheng (昭成)	Feng Hong	430–436	Daxing (大興) 431–436
1 The family name of Gao Yun was changed to Murong when he was adopted by the Murong. If Gao Yun was counted as a ruler of the Later Yan, the Northern Yan would begin in 409. It started in 407 otherwise.

== See also ==
- Goguryeo
- List of past Chinese ethnic groups
- Wu Hu
