= Princess Linhe =

Eastern Wei princess of Rouran descent

Yujiulü Chidelian (郁久閭叱地連)
- Born: 537; Rouran Khaganate (present day Mongolia)
- Died: 550 (aged 12–13); Jinyang (Present day Taiyuan, Shanxi)
- Burial: May – June 550; Tomb of Princess Linhe, Ye, Eastern Wei (Present day Ci County, Hebei)
- Spouse: Emperor Wucheng of Northern Qi
Regnal name
- Princess Linhe (鄰和公主) (lit. 'Princess of Neighboring Peace')
- Father: Anluochen

Yujiulu Chidilian (郁久閭叱地連) (537–550), formally Princess Linhe (鄰和公主) (lit. Princess of Neighboring Peace), was an Eastern Wei princess of Rouran descent. Despite her young age, she is credited with playing a pivotal role in Northern China's mid-sixth-century politics. Her lavish tomb was unearthed in Cixian County, Hebei, China, in 1979. Even though the tomb was pillaged, it still contained a treasure of gold and jeweled ornaments, a thousand clay figurines and vessels, Byzantine coins, murals with mythical creatures, attendants and officials credited as marking a "decisive visual change" in the art, and an epitaph mentioning the close-by mausoleum of Gao Huan, as well as her marriage relationship to a member of the royal Gao family. The tomb is one of the few excavated large-scale tombs from the mid-sixth century in China.

== Early life ==
She was a Rouran, born in the northern steppe, in the Rouran Khaganate. She was born into the royal family of the Rourans, the Yujiulü, and was a grand-daughter of the famous Anagui. Her father was Anluochen (郁久閭菴羅辰), who reigned as khan of the Rourans from 519 until 552. He was married to Princess Le'an (乐安公主), daughter of Gao Cheng, in 541, and is the last known khan of the Rourans. Her family dominated the northern steppe in the first half of the 6th century.

== Marriage ==
She was brought to China in 542 by Gao Huan as a "diplomatic bride" for his son. Many instances of Heqin, the historical practice of Chinese emperors marrying princesses—usually members of minor branches of the ruling family—to rulers of neighboring states and vice versa, have been documented, with notably the cases of Princess Lelang (乐浪公主), who was married to Princess Linhe's fellow countryman Yujiulü Hulü in 411, and Yujiulü Zhaoyi (郁久闾昭仪), who was married to Feng Ba, Emperor of Northern Yan.

Thus, the marriage to Gao Huan's son was a means to seal an "alliance between the Eastern Wei and the princess' Rouran tribe, which dominated the region north of China." This alliance was important, and came at a time of difficult relationships, when the warring east and west regimes were each seeking alliance with the Rourans to defeat the other.

Princess Linhe died in 550, a turbulent year, in which the Gao took power in Eastern Wei and created Gao Qi, with Gao Yang seizing the throne from Emperor Xiaojing of Eastern Wei.

== Tomb of the Princess ==
Her frescoed Tomb was discovered in Cixian County, Hebei in the late 1970s, and many artifacts and the remnants of a pillaged treasure were unearthed from it, including a Gold Piece with Flower and Apsaras Motifs, the Rice Husking Maid, a Shaman figure, the Figure with Cage Crown, the Standing Figure in Pottery in Hood and many other pottery figures including civil officials, warriors and servants wearing different costumes, which provided precious information on the costumes used at the time. The clay figurines and vessels number to a thousand. Scholars have remarked on the "nomadic character" of the Shaman figure, due to her Rouran origins.

The tomb was noted for its exceptional features by scholars. These include her age of death: only 13; her nomadic origins from the northern Steppe as a Rouran, and the murals that decorate her tomb. Scholars have found similarities between her murals and the style of the Han because, since the princess was very young when she came to China, she adapted more easily the Han customs after entering the Gao clan. In the tomb there is an epitaph stating the proximity of her tomb to the mausoleum of Gao Huan, paramount general of Northern Wei, as well as the founder of Eastern Wei. Although the tomb was pillaged, it still contained, in addition to the aforementioned artifacts, Byzantine coins, gold and jeweled ornaments, the latter including a "striking gold placque" inlaid with pearls and amber. The tomb consists of one brick chamber measuring 5.23x5.58 meters, with a corridor connecting the chamber to a passageway, in the style of the Northern dynasties. The tomb is square, with the walls bowing into a cupola on the top. The collapsed ceiling was once decorated with the firmament. The walls are thoroughly covered with images. Her body was found on a platform with a border of limestone. Her tomb is one of the few excavated tombs from the mid-sixth century, and one of the three largest tomb in the region of Ye. Further, the tomb is the "earliest known long, sloping passageway decorated with life-size guards," and with its overall style it heralds a "decisive visual change."

== Sources ==
- History of the Northern Dynasties, Biography II · Concubine Part II.
