= Mugulü =

Rouran chieftain and warrior

Mugulü 木骨閭
- Tribal chief
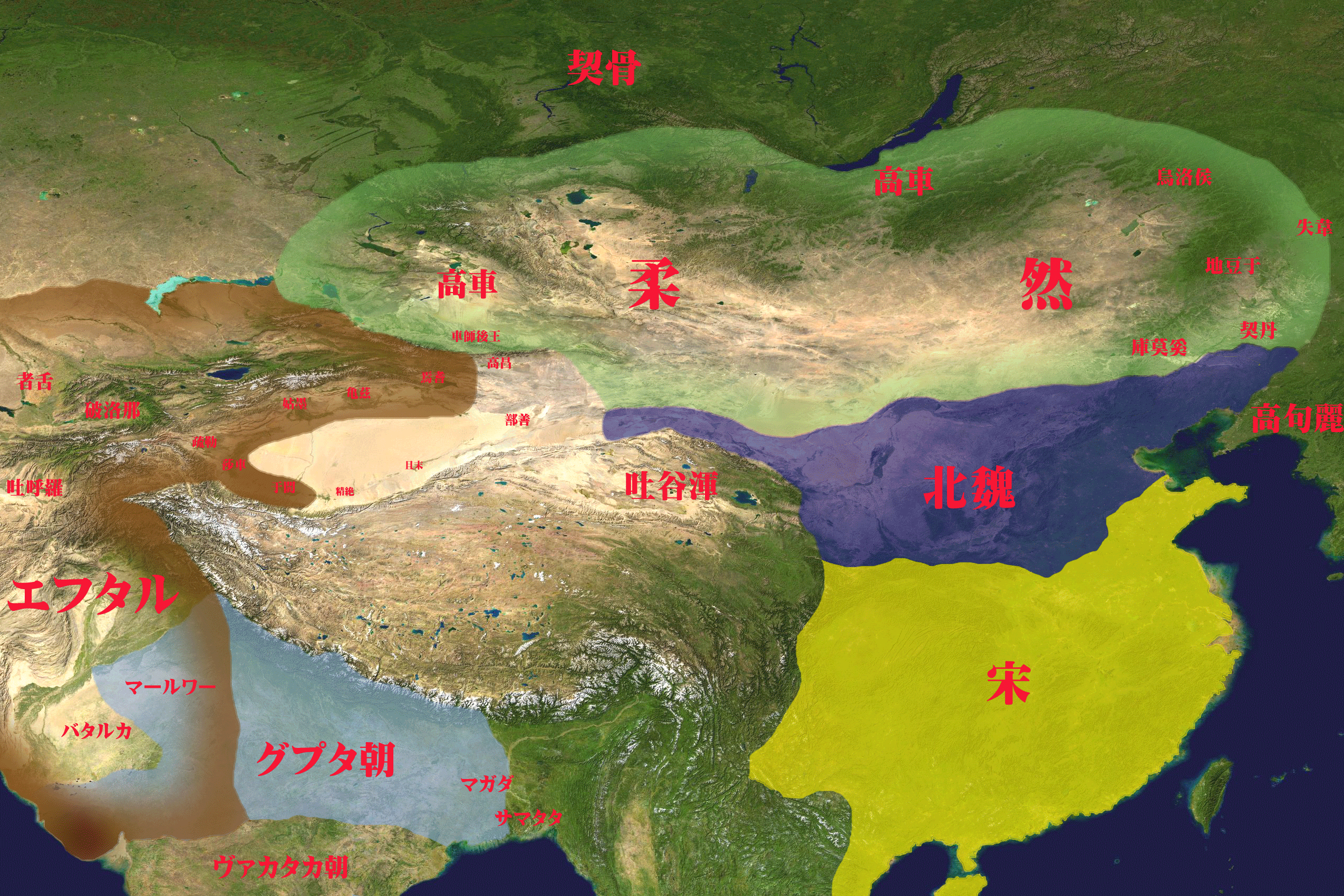
- Map representing Rourans well to the north, located at the epicenter of the eastern steppe, in comparison to other states in its vicinity, with its area of influence extremely west and east, bordering the northern Wei state (北魏), appearing under the bluish color.

Tribal chief of the Rouran tribe
- Reign: 330–? or 308–316
- Coronation: 330 or 308, Hetulin
- Predecessor: Chiefdom established
- Successor: Yujiulü Cheluhui
- Born: 3rd century, before 277
- Died: 4th century, 316 or after 330
- Issue: Yujiulü Cheluhui
Names
- Mùgǔlǘ
- Clan: Yujiulü clan
- Dynasty: Rouran tribe
- Religion: Tengrism
- Occupation: Dai soldier, Xianbei slave (former and uncertain)
- Ethnicity: Proto-Mongol
- Cause of death: Unknown

Chinese name
- Chinese: 木骨閭 (trad.) 木骨闾 (simp.)
Transcriptions
Standard Mandarin
- Hanyu Pinyin: Yùjiǔlǘ Mùgǔlǘ

Mugulü (Chinese: 木骨閭; pinyin: Mùgǔlǘ) was a legendary warrior and chieftain in the Mongolian Plateau during the period when it was under the rule of tribes and peoples originating from the fragmentation of the failed and crumbling Xianbei confederation. The term "Mongol" is a likely derivation from his name.

== Biography ==
=== Youth ===
Mugulü was likely born before AD 277, at the end of Tuoba Liwei's reign.

He served in the Xianbei army under the leadership of the Tuoba tribal chief, Tuoba Yilu (295–316) of Dai. According to Chinese chronicles, Mugulü was a slave of unknown origin who was captured and enslaved by a Tuoba raider cavalryman during the reign of chief Liwei (220–277) of the Tuoba, a Xianbei clan. The anecdote of his enslaved status has been rejected by modern scholars as "a typical insertion by the Chinese historians intended to show the low birth and barbarian nature of the northern nomads." According to Barbara West, Mugulü had been a slave of the Xianbei.

=== Mugulü's career and his escape through the Gobi ===
According to the Book of Wei, after either having matured (being 30 or older) or because of his strength, Mugulü was emancipated and became a warrior in the Tuoba Xianbei cavalry, under the leadership of Tuoba Yilu of Dai (307–316). However, he tarried past the deadline and was sentenced to death by beheading. He vanished and hid in the Gobi Desert, then gathered a hundred or more other escapees. They sought refuge under a neighboring tribe of Tiele people called Hetulin (紇突隣).

It is not known when Mugulü died; sources say 316 AD.

=== Family and succession ===
When Mugulü died, his son Yujiulü Cheluhui acquired his own tribal horde and either Cheluhui was or his tribe called themselves Rouran. Cheluhui's government was marked by nomadism and peace, but they remained subjects to the Xianbei Tuoba.

His descendants and successors were:

1. Yujiulü Cheluhui, son
2. Yujiulü Tunugui, grandson
3. Yujiulü Bati, great-grandson
4. Yujiulü Disuyuan, great-great-grandson

== Personal name ==
According to Chinese chronicles, the Xianbei (Sianbi) master called the captive Mugulü, a Xianbei word glossed as "bald-headed" (首禿) possibly owing to his appearance, his hairline starting at his eyebrow's level, and because he did not remember his name and surname. This was reconstructed as Mongolic Muqur (Mukhur) or Muquli (Mukhuli) presumably "round, smooth" by Japanese researcher Shiratori Kurakichi. Alexander Vovin instead proposes that Mùgúlǘ (木骨閭), in reconstructed Middle Chinese *muwk-kwot-ljo, transcribed Tuoba Xianbei *moqo-lo ~ muqo-lo 'bald head', which is analysable as 'one [who/]which has cut off/fallen off [hair]' and cognate with Mongolic lexical items like Mongolian: Мухар (Written Mongolian moɣutur ~ moqutur 'blunt, hornless, bald tail' (cf. Chinese gloss as 禿尾 'bald tail'), moqu-ɣar, Middle Mongol muqular 'hornless', moqo-dag 'blunt'; all of those are from Proto-Mongolic *muqu 'to be cut off, break off, fall off', which in turn would produce the semantic variation 'blunt ~ hornless ~ hairless ~ bald').

=== Clan name ===
According to the Book of Wei, the dynasty founded by Mugulü's descendants was called Yujiulü, which sounds superficially like Mugulü, and thus the Yujiulü clan (郁久閭氏, reconstructed Middle Chinese: ʔjuk kjǝu ljwo) emerged. Róna-Tas suggests that Yujiulü rendered *ugur(i) > Uğur, a secondary form of Oğur.; Peter B. Golden additionally proposes connection with Turkic uğurluğ "feasible, opportune", later "auspicious fortunate" or oğrï "thief", an etymology more suited to the dynasty's founder's activities; additionally Yujiulü may be comparable to Middle Mongolian uğuli "owl" (> Khalkha ууль uul'), as personal names based on bird names are common in Mongolic.

== See also ==
- Yujiulü Shelun
- Yujiulü Anagui
- Yujiulü Dengshuzi
- Tuoba Liwei
- Tuoba clan
- Xianbei
- Rourans

=== Succession ===
Mugulü Yujiulü clan of Rouran tribe Born: 3rd century, before 277 Died: 4th century, 316 or after 330
Regnal titles
Preceded by None, title created	Tribal chief of Rourans; 330–?	Succeeded by Yujiulü Cheluhui
