= Yujiulü Dengzhu =

Khagan of Rouran
- Reign: 553
- Predecessor: Yujiulü Tiefa
- Successor: Yujiulü Kangti
- Died: 553
- Issue: Yujiulü Tiefa; Yujiulü Kangti
- House: Yujiulü clan
- Father: A son of Yujiulü Nagai
- Religion: Buddhism

Yujiulü Dengzhu (Chinese: 郁久閭登注; pinyin: Yùjiǔlǘ Dēngzhù, r. 553) was one of the last khagans of the remnant Rouran.

== Reign ==
Yujiulü Dengzhu fled to the Northern Qi with his son Yujiulü Kangti and Yujiulü Anluochen following death of Yujiulü Anagui in 552. His second son Yujiulü Tiefa was raised to throne of the Rouran in 552. However he soon died in a battle against Khitans in February 553. Hearing this, Dengzhu was sent back by Emperor Wenxuan of Northern Qi and returned to the steppe with his elder son and took over leadership. However he too faced attacks from the Göktürks which were ruled by Issik Qaghan. He was murdered by one of his advisors – Afuti (阿富提) and was succeeded by Kangti.

== Sources ==
- History of the Northern Dynasties, vol. 86.
