= Yujiulü Kangti =

Khagan of Rouran (r. 553)

Khagan of Rouran
- Reign: 553
- Predecessor: Yujiulü Dengzhu
- Successor: Yujiulü Anluochen
- House: Yujiulü clan
- Father: Yujiulü Dengzhu
- Religion: Buddhism

Yujiulü Kangti (Chinese: 郁久閭康提; pinyin: Yùjiǔlǘ Kāngtí, r. 553) was the penultimate khagan of the remnants Rouran.

== Life ==
Yujiulü Kangti was elder son of Yujiulü Dengzhu. He fled to the Northern Qi following death of Yujiulü Anagui in 552 with Dengzhu and Yujiulü Anluochen. He was raised to throne by a noble called Afuti (阿富提). However he couldn't handle Göktürk attacks and fled back to Northern Qi. He was replaced by Anluochen on the orders of Emperor Wenxuan of Northern Qi.
