= Mumocheng =

Lost capital of the Rouran Khaganate

- Mumo
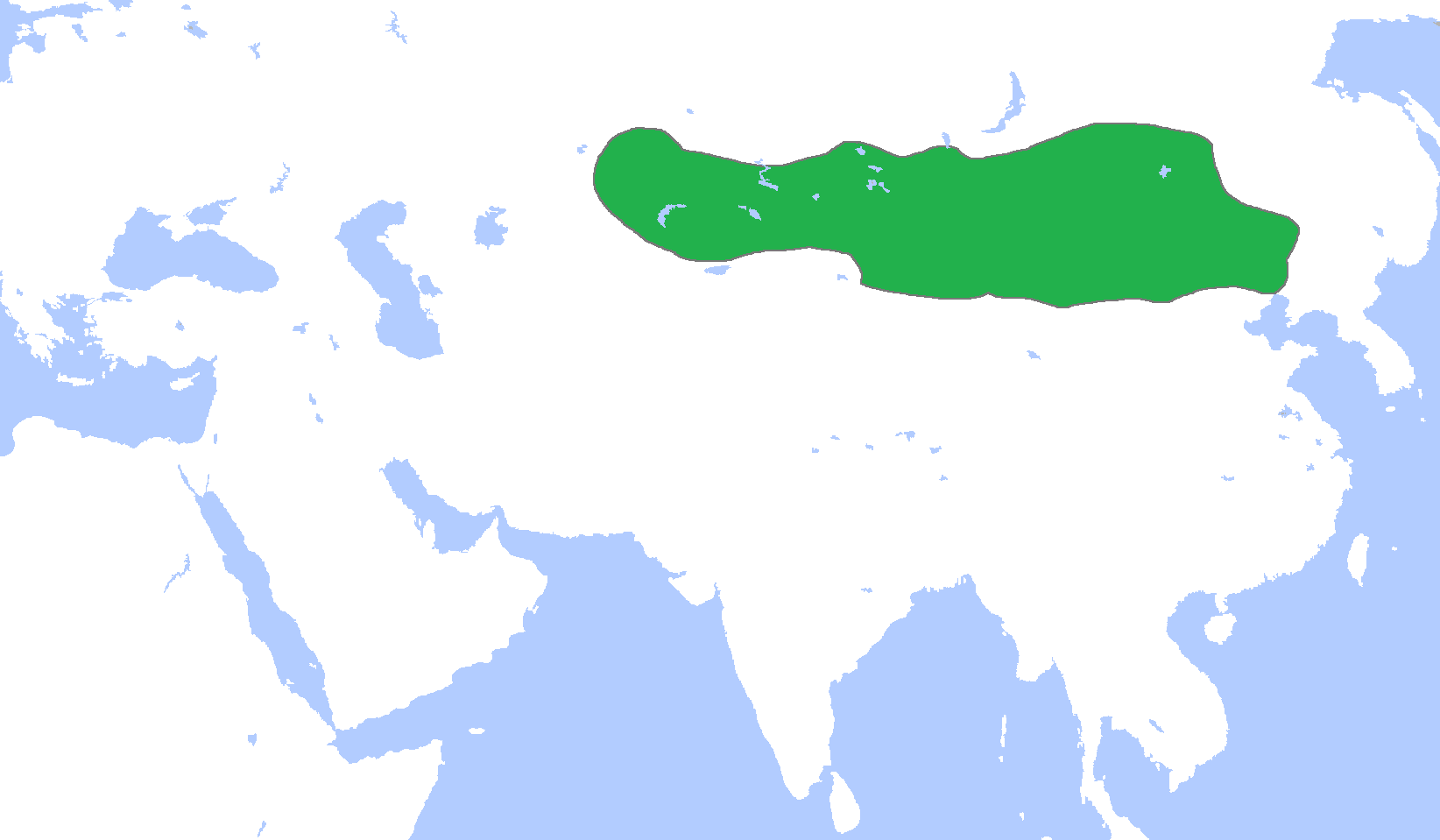
- Rouran Khaganate, c. 500
- Type: Settlement
- Cultures: Steppe nomadic culture Northern dynasties culture
- Region: Rouran Khaganate

History
- Built: c. 500 CE
- Built by: Anagui Khan

Mumocheng was the capital of the Rouran Khaganate. Its location is disputed, and no traces of it have been found.

The capital of the Rouran Khaganate likely changed over time. While the Rouran were nomads, a capital city served, for one thing, as a place where all the khaganate's chieftains could convene to discuss very important matters regarding the steppe. It is plausible that Mumocheng was located in a place with more favorable climatic and geographic conditions than the average location in the territory of the Rouran Khaganate. The Chinese chroniclers described in this way the harsh conditions in which the Rouran lived:

in their countries there are dismal mountains on which snow accumulates at the height of summer and the plains stretch for several thousand li, their ends hidden from view no matter how the eyesight strains. There is no green grass in the steppe, the climate is severe, horses and cattle chew dry grass and lick snow, but they are fat and sound by nature

Originally, the Rouran roamed in the summer, and in the winter moved south, crossing the Gobi Desert. This however wasn't the case with all Rouran tribes. Called a "band of nomadic robbers" by some modern scholars, the Rouran were in a swinging relationship of conflict and alliance with the Northern Wei (later Eastern and Western Wei), which they raided and extorted, and who used them to quell revolts in their own countries and fight each other, considering them at first a vassal state and then partners of equal rights. At the same time, on the other front, they subjugated the Tiele and the Hephthalites and conquered Gaochang, installing the Han Chinese Kan Bozhou as their vassal king.

According to Chinese sources, after the establishment of the khaganate, the khagan's headquarters (ting) was northwest of Gansu. Later, the capital was moved to Mumocheng.

It is said that Mumocheng was built in the early 6th century, most likely by Yujiulü Anagui. It is said that it was "encircled with two walls constructed by Liang shu." The Rouran controlled the trade routes, and thus had access to much sought-after items, and skilled workers, from both the east and west. While there is no information about monuments built by the Rouran, it is known that they had doctors, artisans and weavers sent to them from China.

Anagui, the putative builder of the city, revolutionized the Rouran Khaganate, adopting many aspects of the culture and administration of the classical Chinese states. He elected officials at his court in the Chinese manner, formed a unit of bodyguards (chamberlains, secretaries), and "surrounded himself with advisers trained in the tradition of Chinese bibliophily (shen shi)." His chief minister was Shunyu Tan, a Chinese.
