= Yujiulü Poluomen =

Khagan of Rouran
- Reign: 521–524
- Predecessor: Yujiulü Anagui
- Successor: Yujiulü Anagui
- Died: 525; Luoyang, Northern Wei
Regnal name
- Míǒukěshèjù Kèhán (彌偶可社句可汗); Mungqaγasiyaqu Qaγan; Silent Khagan
- House: Yujiulü clan
- Father: A son of Yujiulü Nagai
- Religion: Buddhism

Yujiulü Poluomen (Chinese: 郁久閭婆羅門; pinyin: Yùjiǔlǘ Póluómén) was a khagan of Rouran and had the title Mioukesheju Khagan (彌偶可社句可汗; Rouran: Mungqaγasiyaqu Qaγan). He was a grandson of Yujiulü Nagai and a cousin of Yujiulü Anagui.

== Reign ==
Yujiulü Poluomen proclaimed himself khagan of the Rouran after coup against Yujiulü Anagui by Qilifa Shifa (俟力发示发). Having lost the fight, Anagui fled to the Northern Wei. Emperor Xiaoming sheltered him and ordered his advisors to bring him to his palace. The Chinese court sent an ambassador who was to find out Poluomen’s intentions and urged him to accept Anagui as his vassal. Poluomen did not speak with the ambassador, who refused to give him honor as a sovereign lord.

Soon, unrest began again among the Rouran. This time Qilifa Shifa marched against Yujiulü Poluomen. The Gaoche took advantage of this and attacked Poluomen. He was forced to transfer his capital to Liangzhou (Central Gansu) and asked to accept Wei overlordship. As Poluomen lost power over the Rouran, several nobles started to fight against each other. The Northern Wei solved the problem by partitioning the Rouran between Poluomen and Anagui. Anagui resided in Huaishuo (modern Guyang, Inner Mongolia), while Poluomen ruled from Xihai (modern Ejin, Inner Mongolia).

In 522 Poluomen decided to flee with his soldiers to Hephtalite relatives, but the Chinese troops arrested him and in 522 took him to Luoyang, where he lived under the house arrest in the Lonananguan Palace until his death in 525.

He was posthumously made Duke Guangmu (广牧公).

== Sources ==
- History of the Northern Dynasties, vol. 86.
- Book of Wei, vol. 103
