= Yujiulü Tiefa =

Khagan of Rouran (d. 553)

Khagan of Rouran
- Reign: 552–553
- Predecessor: Yujiulü Anagui
- Successor: Yujiulü Dengzhu
- Died: February 553
- House: Yujiulü clan
- Father: Yujiulü Dengzhu
- Religion: Buddhism

Yujiulü Tiefa (Chinese: 郁久閭鐵伐; pinyin: Yùjiǔlǘ Tiěfá, r. 552–553) was the successor to Yujiulü Anagui in the eastern part of the Rouran. He was proclaimed khagan by remnants of the Rouran in 552. But he ruled only briefly until his death at the hands of Khitans in February 553. He was succeeded by his father Yujiulü Dengzhu, who at first fled to the Northern Qi following death of Yujiulü Anagui.
