= Princess Ruru =

Chinese consort (530CE–548CE)

Princess Ruru (蠕蠕公主)
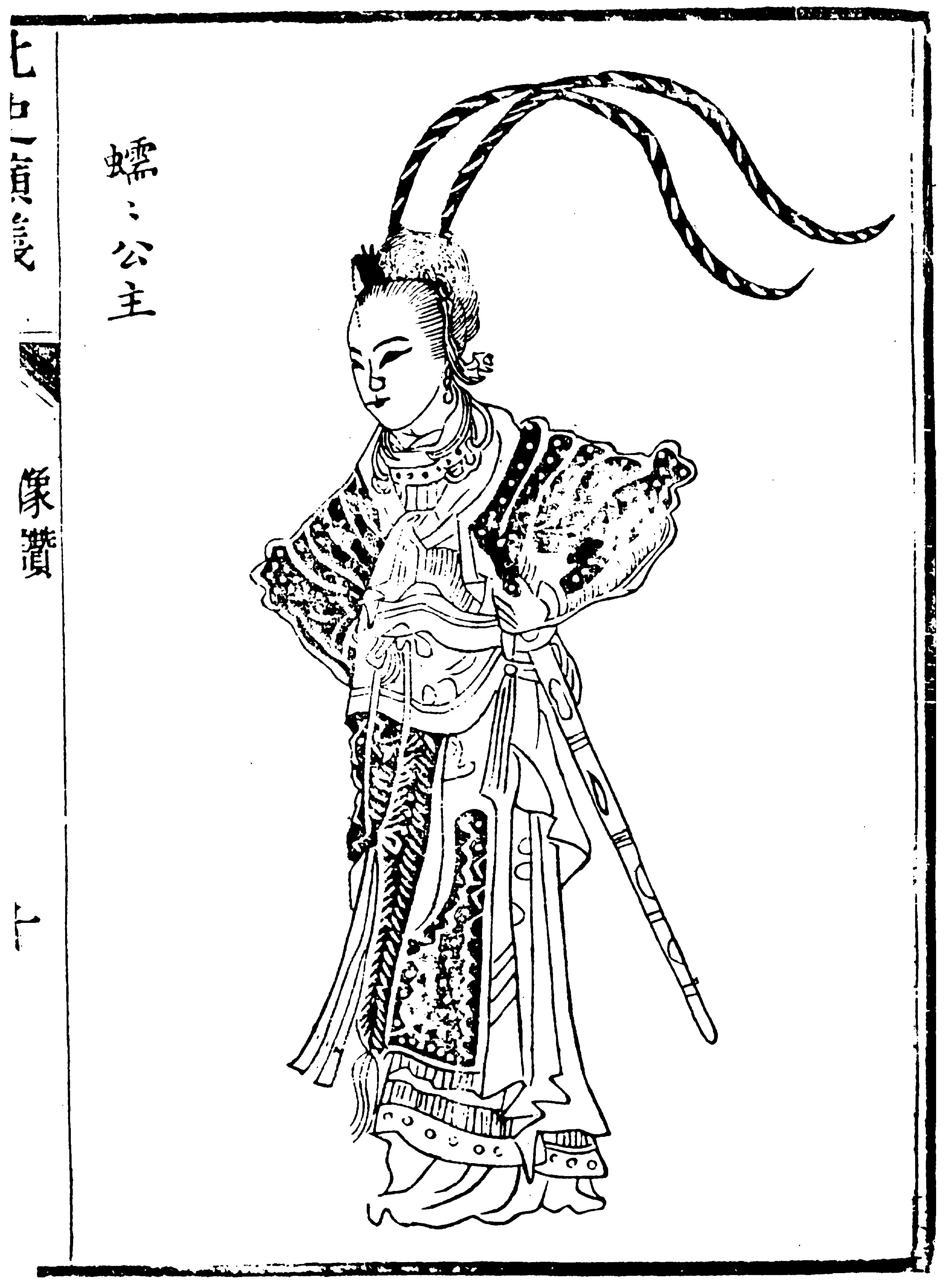
- Born: 530; Mobei (North of the Gobi desert, in an area including Outer Mongolia)
- Died: 6 May 548 (aged 17–18)
- Spouse: Gao Huan (m. 545); Gao Cheng (m. 547)
- Issue: 1 daughter, Gao Shi (高氏) (with Gao Cheng)
- Father: Anagui

Princess Ruru of Northern Qi (蠕蠕公主) (530 CE – 6 May 548 CE) was the consort of Gao Huan, the regent of Eastern Wei, and later of Gao Cheng, Gao Huan's eldest son. She was the daughter of Anagui, the famed khan of the Rourans.

== Biography ==
She was born in Mobei, north of Gobi Desert, in an area that included Outer Mongolia, present-day Mongolia. She was said to be very good at shooting. She was born into the royal Yujiulü clan, and her father was the famed Anagui, khan of the Rourans.

In fall 545, due to an alliance between Western Wei and Rouran to attack Eastern Wei, Gao Huan sued for peace with Rouran by requesting a marriage between a daughter of Yujiulü Anagui and Gao Cheng, his eldest son. Yujiulü Anagui refused, stating that it would only be sufficient if Gao Huan himself married her. Gao Huan initially refused, because he respected his then-wife Lou Zhaojun very much, and was therefore reluctant to marry Yujiulü Anagui's daughter and create her as Queen, but was persuaded otherwise, and he married Yujiulü Anagui's daughter, referring to her as the Princess Ruru (蠕蠕公主). To facilitate this marriage, Lou Zhaojun moved out of the mansion, though Gao Huan and Lou Zhaojun were not formally divorced.

After Gao Huan's death, pursuant to Rouran customs, Princess Ruru became married to Gao Huan's son Gao Cheng, who also, however, did not formally divorce his wife, Princess Yuan. She gave birth to a daughter with Gao Cheng.

== In popular culture ==
She was portrayed by Bai Shan in the 2013 Chinese television series Legend of Lu Zhen. There, she is depicted as being the mother of Gao Zhan and Gao Xiang.

== Sources ==
- History of the Northern Dynasties, Biographies of the Second · Concubine Part II.
