= Yujiulü Anluochen =

Khagan of Rouran
- Reign: 553–554
- Predecessor: Yujiulü Kangti
- Successor: Occupation by First Turkic Khaganate
- Spouses: Princess Le'an (乐安公主)
- Issue: Princess Linhe (鄰和公主)
- House: Yujiulü clan
- Father: Yujiulü Anagui
- Religion: Buddhism

Yujiulü Anluochen (Chinese: 郁久閭菴羅辰; pinyin: Yùjiǔlǘ Ānluóchén) (?–554) was the last khagan of the Rouran (553–554) in the east. He was the son of Yujiulü Anagui.

== Biography ==
=== During reign of Anagui ===
Yujiulü Anluochen was married to Princess Le'an (乐安公主), daughter of Gao Cheng in 541. The khagan sent 1,000 horses and asked to bring the princess, who was renamed Princess Lanling (兰陵公主). In view of the importance of an alliance with the Rouran, Gao Huan personally presided the collection of the dowry and led the princess and her retinue to the Rouran. Anagui was very pleased with the marriage. He was in the party of refugees that went to the Northern Qi after Khagan Yujiulü Anagui's fall in 552.

=== Reign ===
Being a son-in-law to the Northern Qi, he was supported by Emperor Wenxuan of Northern Qi against the Göktürks. The Emperor personally attacked the Göktürks, fighting off its army, and then made Yujiulü Anluochen the new khagan of the Rouran, settling the Rouran people within Northern Qi territory, at Mayi (馬邑, in modern Shuozhou, Shanxi). Despite this, he rebelled in September 554, led more than 50,000 people to attack on the Qi borders. Emperor Wenxuan personally led his army and defeated Anluochen. He made yet another attack in April towards Si Prefecture (肆州, later Dai Prefecture, nowadays in northern Shanxi), but was repulsed. Meanwhile 30,000 of his people were captured with women and children enslaved. He made his last attack on Yingzhou (营州, now Chaoyang, Liaoning) in 554 and was utterly defeated. His whereabouts after that are unknown.

== Family ==
His daughter Yujiulü Chidelian (郁久閭叱地連) was married to Emperor Wucheng of Northern Qi and was made Princess Linhe (Chinese: 鄰和公主; lit. 'Princess of Neighboring Peace', d. 550). Her tomb was discovered in 1979.

== Sources ==
- Zhizhi Tongjian, vol. 165

Preceded by Yujiulü Kangti	Khagan of the Rouran; 553–554	Succeeded by None
