= Yujiulü Cheluhui =

Rouran tribal chief

Yujiulü Cheluhui 郁久閭車鹿會
- Tribal chief
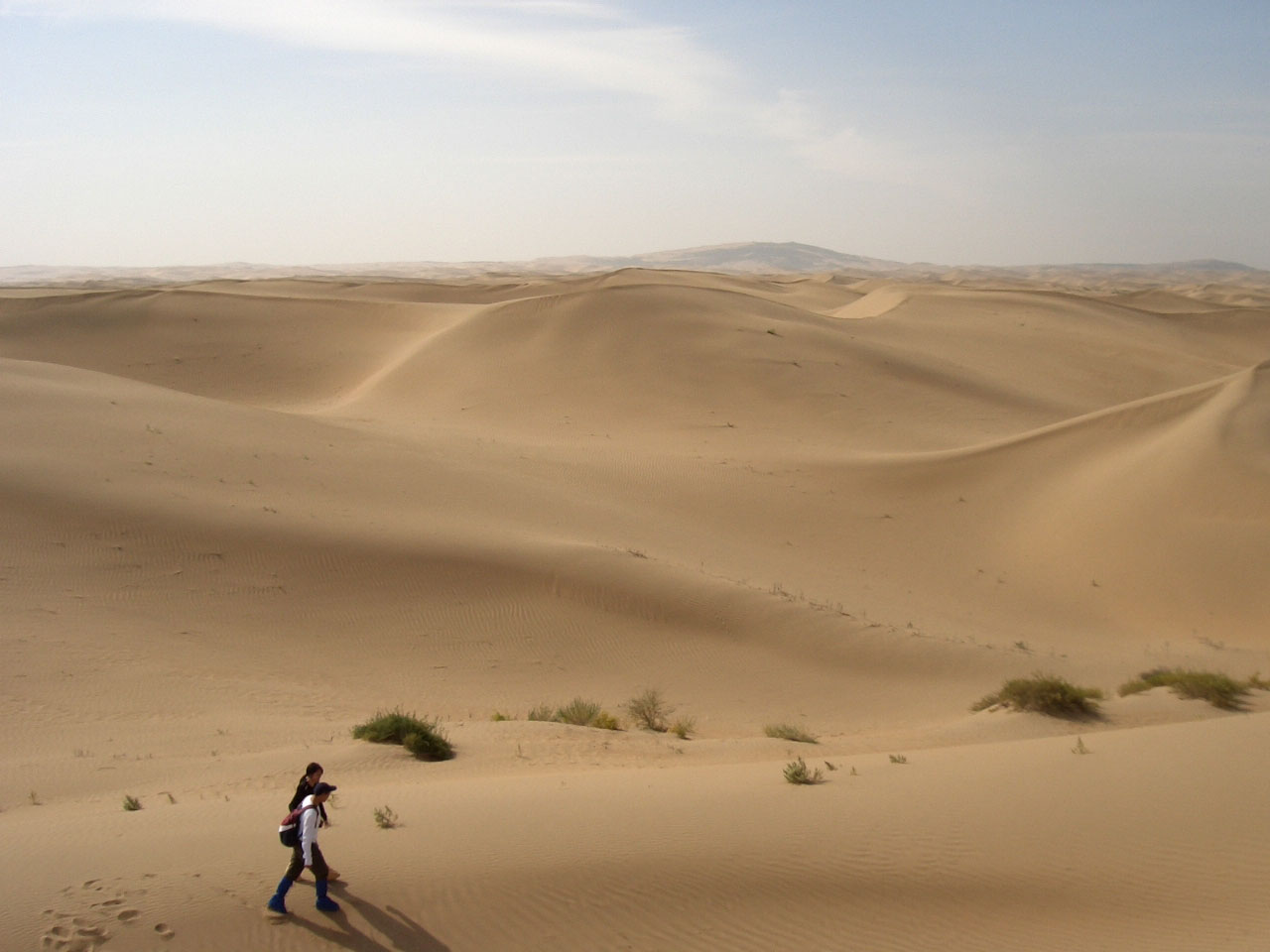
- In the Gobi Desert, Mugulü passed through the Gobi in order to escape from his pursuers, his son, with his tribe already established, traveled through the Gobi.

Tribal chief of the Rouran tribe
- Reign: 4th century
- Predecessor: Yujiulü Mugulü
- Successor: Yujiulü Tunugui
- Regent: Yujiulü Tunugui
- Died: 4th century
- Issue: Yujiulü Tunugui
Names
- Yujiulü Cheluhui
- House: Yujiulü clan
- Father: Yujiulü Mugulü
- Occupation: Xianbei soldier, warrior

Yujiulü Cheluhui
- Chinese: 郁久閭車鹿會
Transcriptions
Standard Mandarin
- Hanyu Pinyin: Yùjiǔlǘ Chēlùhuì

Yujiulü Cheluhui (Chinese: 郁久閭車鹿會; pinyin: Yùjiǔlǘ Chēlùhuì) was ruler and tribal chief of the Rourans.

He succeeded his father Mugulü as tribal chief. His government was marked by nomadism and peace.

== Government ==
=== Migration and peace ===
Yujiulü Cheluhui gathered his Rouran subordinates. During his reign, the Rourans did not fight and wandered peacefully. They crossed the Gobi Desert like nomads in the winter and moved south and returned north in the summer. Although they established the tribe, they still belonged to the Northern Wei and Xianbei and contributed to them with skins and horses.

=== Heroism and the "tribal meeting" ===
After Mugulü's death, Yujiulü Cheluhui, noted for being heroic and vigorous, created a tribal confederation, whose self-name was "Rouran", later derisively changed to "Ruru" ~ "Ruanruan" by Emperor Taiwu of Northern Wei, who considered them ignorant and worm-like in appearance. The Yujiulü family began to have a group of people, self-commanding and self-proclaimed Rouran. Later, he would be succeeded by his son, Tunugui.

== See also ==
- Yujiulü Mugulü

== Bibliography ==
=== Primary Sources ===
- "Book of Wei" (Volume 103 - Account 91) (in Chinese)
- "History of the Northern Dynasties" (Volume 98 - Account 86) (in Chinese)

Yujiulü Cheluhui Yujiulü clan Born: ? Died: 4th century
Regnal titles
| Preceded by Yujiulü Mugulü | Tribal chief of rourans 4th century | Succeeded by Yujiulü Tunugui |
