= Tomb of Princess Linhe =

6th Century Chinese tomb

Tomb of a Ruru Princess
- Location within China

General information
- Location: Dazhongying, Ci County, Hebei, China
- Coordinates: 36°22′N 114°23′E

The Tomb of Yujiulu Chidilian, the Tomb of Princess Linhe, the Tomb of a Rouran Princess or the Tomb of a Ruru Princess is located in Cixian County, Hebei, China. Built at the turn of the 6th century, it is the tomb of Yujiulu Chidilian (郁久閭叱地連), formally Princess Linhe, a Princess of the Eastern Wei of Rouran descent. The tomb is lavished with artistic features; even though it was pillaged, the excavators found gold and jeweled ornaments, Byzantine coins, and pottery. It contained about a thousand valuable clay figurines. These figurines wear different and particular costumes, providing important information on the costumes used at the time. Among the unearthed figures was that of a shaman, which points to Princess Linhe's nomadic Rouran descent. The murals feature mythical creatures, attendants and officials and they are credited with marking a "decisive visual change" in the art. The tomb is one of the few excavated large-scale tombs from the mid-sixth century in China, and one of the three largest tomb in the Ye region.

== The tomb ==
The Tomb of Princess Linhe was discovered in Cixian County, Hebei in 1979. The remnants of pillaged treasure and many artifacts were unearthed from it, including a Gold Piece with Flower and Apsaras Motifs, the Rice Husking Maid, a shaman figure, the Figure with Cage Crown, the Standing Figure in Pottery in Hood. A thousand vessels and clay figures were found. The figures include depictions of civil officials, warriors and servants wearing different costumes that provided information on the costumes used at the time. Scholars have remarked on the "nomadic character" of the shaman figure, due to the Rouran origins of the princess.

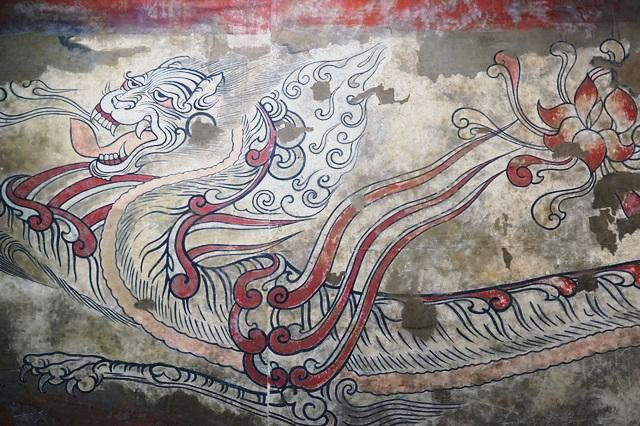
Mural with mythological creature

The tomb was noted for its luxury and exceptional features by scholars, and for the circumstances of its construction and of the interred princess. The Rouran-born Wei princess was only 13 at the time of her death, she had nomadic origins on the northern steppe, and the murals that decorate her tomb are of high quality and are a watershed case. Scholars have noted similarities between the murals in this tomb and the style of the Han because, since the princess was very young when she came to China, she adapted more easily to the Han customs after entering the Gao clan. The murals embody conventional traditions from Northern Wei Luoyang as well as traditions from southern Chinese dynasties, reconfiguring them "into innovative processions," with unique life-size human figures, which are also extended from the usual number and present on both sides of the passageway.

While the mythological imagery in the celestial ceiling alludes to the "canonical postmortem realm for the princess," the human-sized, frontal figures of officials, statesmen, and pageantry in the passageway shift the focus to the human component, the temporal dimension where the Gao, who took the initiative to build this lavish tomb for their princess and first public monument, hold authority.

In the tomb there is an epitaph stating the proximity of her tomb to the mausoleum of Gao Huan, paramount general of Northern Wei and founder of Eastern Wei, as well as her name and a brief genealogy. Although the tomb was pillaged, it still contained, in addition to the aforementioned artifacts, vessels, Byzantine coins, gold and jeweled ornaments. The latter include a "striking gold placque" inlaid with pearls and amber.

The tomb consists of one brick chamber measuring 5.23 m (17.2 ft) by 5.58 m (18.3 ft), with a sloping corridor connecting the chamber to a passageway, in the style of the northern dynasties. The tomb is square, with the walls bowing into a cupola on the top. Fragments of stars were found among the remains of the ceiling (now collapsed), which was once decorated with the firmament, and mythological images. The walls are thoroughly covered with images.

Her body was found on a platform with a border of limestone. Her tomb is one of the few excavated tombs from the mid-sixth century, and one of the three largest tombs in the Ye region. Further, the tomb is the "earliest known long, sloping passageway decorated with life-size guards," and with its overall style it heralds a "decisive visual change."
