= Dudang Township =

Dudang Township 都党乡
- Rural Township
- Dūdăng Xiāng
- Location in Hebei Location in China
- Coordinates: 36°22′15″N 114°05′31″E
- Country: People's Republic of China
- Province: Hebei
- Prefecture-level city: Handan
- County: Ci

Area
  - Total: 42.76 km^{2} (16.51 sq mi)

Population (2010)
  - Total: 16,009
  - Density: 374.4/km^{2} (970/sq mi)
- Time zone: UTC+8 (China Standard)

Dudang Township (Chinese: 都党乡; pinyin: Dūdăng Xiāng) is a rural township located in Ci County, Handan, Hebei, China. According to the 2010 census, Dudang Township had a population of 16,009, including 8,076 males and 7,933 females. The population was distributed as follows: 2,931 people aged under 14, 12,085 people aged between 15 and 64, and 993 people aged over 65.

== See also ==
- List of township-level divisions of Hebei
