= Yujiulü Furen =

Chinese nobleman

- 郁久闾伏仁
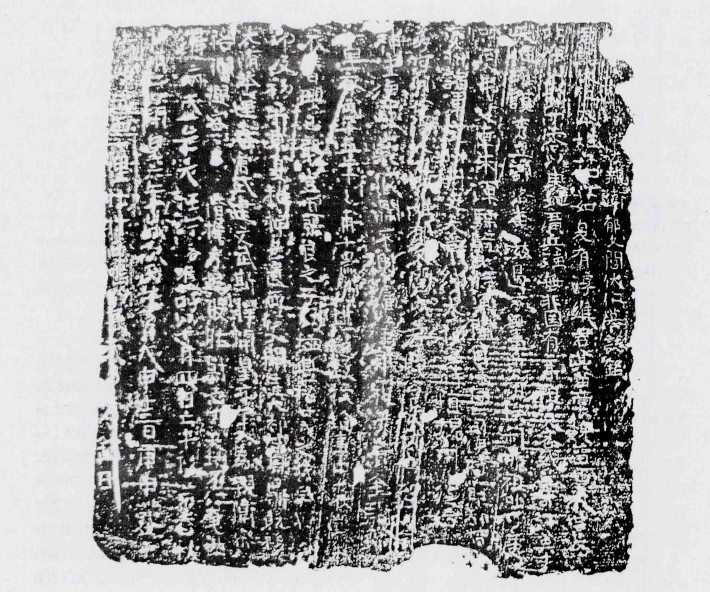
- Epitaph of Furen

Official of Sui

Personal details
- Died: 29 November 586
- Parent: Che Zhuhun (father)
- Relatives: Tuwandu Tuhelufu (grandfather); Khan Datan

Yujiulü Furen (郁久闾伏仁) (died on 29 November 586) was a nobleman and official of the Sui dynasty.

== Biography ==
From his epitaph, it emerged that his ancestors were Chunwei, and that their surname was originally Ruru (Chinese: 茹茹; pinyin: Rú rú), of royal Rouran descent. Furen was a descendant of Datan, Khan of the Rourans, himself a cousin of Hulü. His great-grandfather had been an ally of Feng Ba, and had conducted campaigns against Northern Wei, though he was less successful than other Rouran khans.

His great-grandfather was Qi Lifu (Chinese: 俟力弗; pinyin: Qí lì fú), while his grandfather was Tuwandu Tuhelufu (Chinese: 吐万度吐河入弗; pinyin: Tǔ wàn dù tǔ hé rù fú). His father was Che Zhuhun (Chinese: 车朱浑; pinyin: Chē zhū hún) who rose to the rank of General of Agile Cavalry, Provincial Governor of Yanzhou, Ministry of Ceremonies. During the Taihe period he moved south together with the Xianbei of the Northern dynasty, establishing himself in Luoyang, Henan.

Yu Jiulü Furen was an official in the Sui dynasty, to whom was dedicated the epitaph unearthed in the 20th century. He died on October 13 in the sixth year of the Kaihuang (开皇/開皇) Era.

His epitaph was unearthed in March 1963 in Wangqiao Village, Erwuli, South of Diaoyangcheng, Hebei Province.
