= Rouran Khaganate =

330–550 AD Proto-Mongolic state

- 330–555
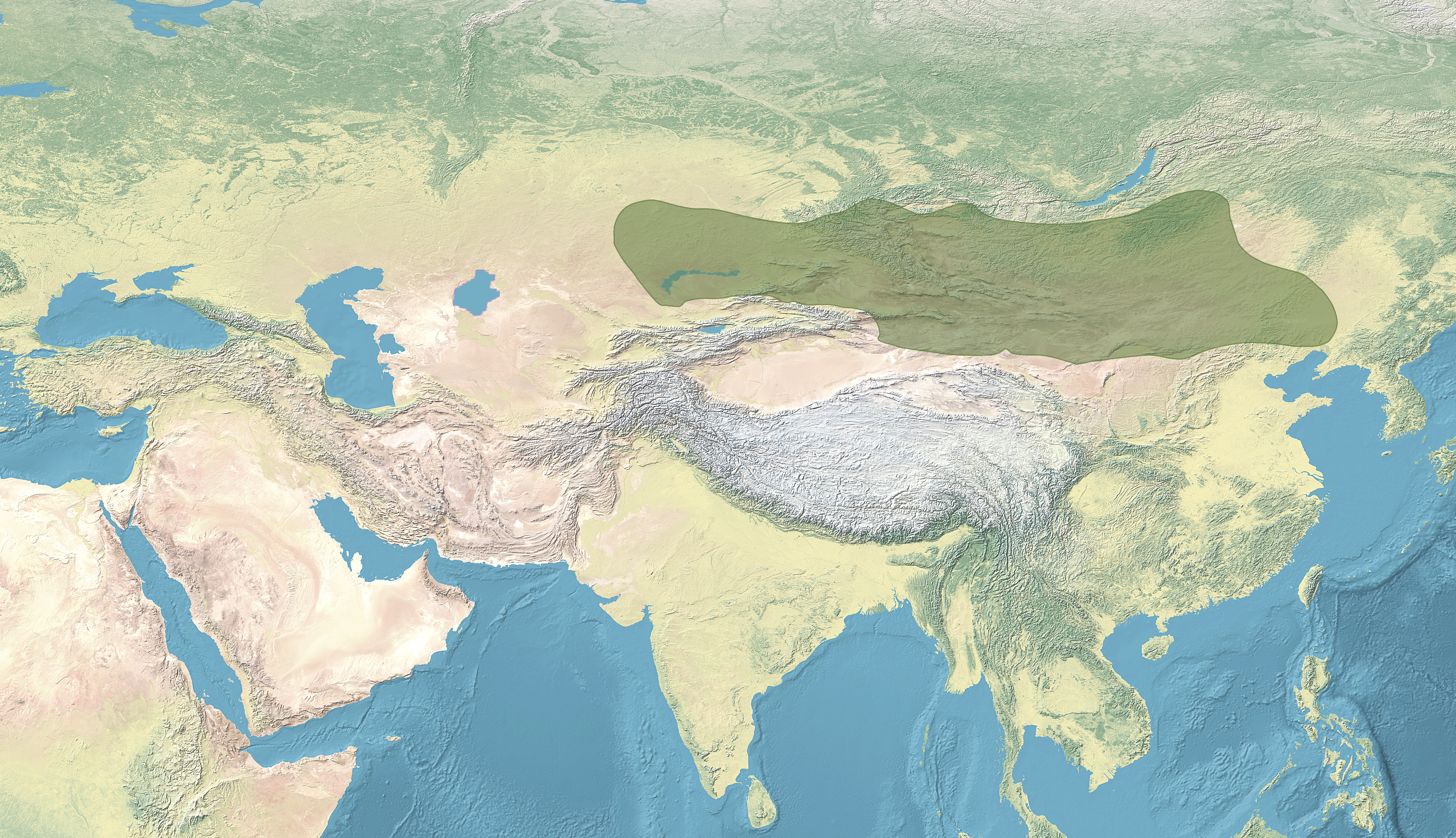
- Core territories of the Rouran Khaganate
- Status: Khaganate
- Capital: Ting northwest of Gansu; Mumocheng
- Common languages: Rouran; Turkic; Mongolic; Middle Chinese (diplomacy)
- Religion: Tengrism; Shamanism; Buddhism
- Khagan
  - 330 AD: Mugulü
  - 555 AD: Yujiulü Dengshuzi
- Legislature: Kurultai
- Historical era: Late antiquity
  - Established: 330
  - Disestablished: 555

Area
- 405: 2,800,000 km^{2} (1,100,000 sq mi)
Preceded by
Xianbei
Succeeded by
First Turkic Khaganate
Northern Qi
Northern Zhou
- Today part of: China; Kazakhstan; Mongolia; Russia

Rouran
- Chinese: 柔然
Transcriptions
Standard Mandarin
- Hanyu Pinyin: Róurán
- Wade–Giles: Jou^{2}-jan^{2}
- IPA: [ɻǒʊ.ɻǎn]
Middle Chinese
- Middle Chinese: /ȵɨu ȵiᴇn/

Ruru or Ruanruan
- Chinese: 蠕蠕
Transcriptions
Standard Mandarin
- Hanyu Pinyin: Rúrú, Ruǎnruǎn
- Wade–Giles: Ju^{2}-ju^{2}, Juan^{3}-juan^{3}
- IPA: [ɻǔ.ɻǔ], [ɻuàn.ɻuàn]
Middle Chinese
- Middle Chinese: /ȵɨo ȵɨo/, /ȵiuᴇn^{X} ȵiuᴇn^{X}/

Ruru
- Chinese: 茹茹
Transcriptions
Standard Mandarin
- Hanyu Pinyin: Rúrú
- Wade–Giles: Ju^{2}-ju^{2}
- IPA: [ɻǔ.ɻǔ]

Ruirui
- Chinese: 芮芮
Transcriptions
Standard Mandarin
- Hanyu Pinyin: Ruìruì
- Wade–Giles: Jui^{4}-jui^{4}
- IPA: [ɻwêɪ.ɻwêɪ]

Rouru or Rouruan
- Chinese: 蝚蠕
Transcriptions
Standard Mandarin
- Hanyu Pinyin: Róurú, Róuruǎn
- Wade–Giles: Jou^{2}-ju^{2}, Jou^{2}-juan^{3}
- IPA: [ɻǒʊ.ɻǔ], [ɻǒʊ.ɻuàn]

Tantan
- Chinese: 檀檀
Transcriptions
Standard Mandarin
- Hanyu Pinyin: Tántán
- Wade–Giles: T'an^{2}-t'an^{2}
- IPA: [tʰǎn.tʰǎn]

The Rouran Khaganate (Chinese: 柔然; Róurán), also known as Ruanruan or Juan-juan (蠕蠕; Ruǎnruǎn) (or variously Jou-jan, Ruruan, Ju-juan, Ruru, Ruirui, Rouru, Rouruan or Tantan), was a tribal confederation and later state. The Rouran state was undoubtedly multi-ethnic, most of the historical sources state that they were the descendants of the Xiongnu or a collateral branch of the Xiongnu. Some others state that they were descendants of the Donghu or mixed barbarians beyond the northern border of China Proper. The Book of Song and Book of Liang connected Rourans to the earlier Xiongnu while the Book of Wei connected them to Proto-Mongolic Donghu. The Rouran supreme rulers used the title of khagan, a popular title borrowed from the Xianbei. The Rouran Khaganate lasted from the late 4th century until the middle 6th century with territory that covered all of modern-day Mongolia and Inner Mongolia, as well as parts of Manchuria in Northeast China, Eastern Siberia, Xinjiang, and Kazakhstan. The Hephthalites were vassals of the Rouran Khaganate until the beginning of the 5th century, with the royal house of Rourans intermarrying with the royal houses of the Hephthalites. The Rouran Khaganate ended when they were defeated by a Göktürk rebellion.

Their Khaganate overthrown, some Rouran remnants possibly became Tatars while others possibly migrated west and became the Pannonian Avars (known by such names as Varchonites or Pseudo Avars), who settled in Pannonia (centred on modern Hungary) during the 6th century. These Avars were pursued into the Byzantine Empire by the Göktürks, who referred to the Avars as a slave or vassal people, and requested that the Byzantines expel them. While this Rouran-Avars link remains a controversial theory, a recent DNA study has confirmed the genetic origins of the Avar elite as originating from the Mongolian plains. Other theories instead link the origins of the Pannonian Avars to peoples such as the Uar.

An imperial confederation, the Rouran Khaganate was based on the "distant exploitation of agrarian societies", although according to Nikolay Kradin the Rouran had a feudal system, or "nomadic feudalism". The Rouran controlled trade routes, and raided and subjugated oases and outposts such as Gaochang. They are said to have shown the signs of "both an early state and a chiefdom". The Rouran have been credited as "a band of steppe robbers", because they adopted a strategy of raids and extortion of Northern China. The Khaganate was an aggressive militarized society, a "military-hierarchical polity established to solve the exclusively foreign-policy problems of requisitioning surplus products from neighbouring nations and states."

== Name ==
=== Nomenclature ===
Róurán 柔然 is a Classical Chinese transcription of the endonym of the confederacy; meanwhile, 蠕蠕 Ruǎnruǎn ~ Rúrú (Book of Wei), which connoted something akin to "wriggling worm", was used derogatorily in Tuoba-Xianbei sources. Other transcriptions are 蝚蠕 Róurú ~ Róuruǎn (Book of Jin); 茹茹 Rúrú (Book of Northern Qi, Book of Zhou, Book of Sui); 芮芮 Ruìruì (Book of Qi, Book of Liang, Book of Song), 大檀 Dàtán and 檀檀 Tántán (Book of Song). However, Baumer (2018), while acknowledging that Ruanruan (蠕蠕) was a "derogatory pun" on Rouran (柔然), proposes that the ethnonym Rouran (柔然) is indeed derived from the name Ruru (茹茹) or Ruirui (芮芮) of a "tribal father". (Note: likely Cheluhui, compare Book of Wei 103 and Golden (2013).)

Mongolian Sinologist Sükhbaatar suggests Nirun Нирун as the modern Mongolian term for the Rouran, as Нирун resembles reconstructed Chinese forms beginning with *ń- or *ŋ-. Rashid-al-Din Hamadani recorded Niru'un and Dürlükin as two divisions of the Mongols.

=== Etymology ===
Klyastorny reconstructed the ethnonym behind the Chinese transcription 柔然 Róurán (LHC: *ńu-ńan; EMC: *ɲuw-ɲian > LMC: *riw-rian) as *nönör and compares it to Mongolic нөкүр nökür "friend, comrade, companion" (Khalkha нөхөр nöhör). According to Klyashtorny, *nönör denotes "stepnaja vol'nica" "a free, roving band in the steppe, the 'companions' of the early Rouran leaders". In early Mongol society, a nökür was someone who had left his clan or tribe to pledge loyalty to and serve a charismatic warlord; if this derivation were correct, Róurán 柔然 was originally not an ethnonym, but a social term referring to the dynastic founder's origins or the core circle of companions who helped him build his state.

However, Golden identifies philological problems: the ethnonym should have been *nöŋör to be cognate to nökür, & possible assimilation of -/k/- to -/n/- in Chinese transcription needs further linguistic proofs. Even if 柔然 somehow transmitted nökür, it more likely denoted the Rouran's status as the subjects of the Tuoba. Before being used as an ethnonym, Rouran had originally been the byname of chief Cheluhui (車鹿會), possibly denoting his status "as a Wei servitor".

== History ==
=== Origin ===
The Book of Song and Book of Liang, which are primary sources connected Rouran to the earlier Xiongnu while the Book of Wei traced the Rouran's origins back to the Donghu, generally agreed to be Proto-Mongols. Xu proposed that "the main body of the Rouran were of Xiongnu origin" and Rourans' descendants, namely Da Shiwei (aka Tatars), contained Turkic elements, besides the Mongolic Xianbei. Even so, the Xiongnu's language is still unknown and Chinese historians routinely ascribed Xiongnu origins to various nomadic groups, yet such ascriptions do not necessarily indicate the subjects' exact origins: for examples, Xiongnu ancestry was ascribed to Turkic-speaking Göktürks and Tiele as well as Para-Mongolic-speaking Kumo Xi and Khitans. According to Savelyev and Jeong (2020), the Xiongnu resulted from the admixture of two groups, a Turkic-origin group of an eastern Eurasian genetic substratum and an Iranian Saka group (like the Chandman). They further write The predominant part of the Xiongnu population is likely to have spoken Turkic and Arguably, these Iranian-speaking groups were assimilated over time by the predominant Turkic-speaking part of the Xiongnu population.

Kwok Kin Poon additionally proposes that the Rouran were descended specifically from Donghu's Xianbei lineage, i.e. from Xianbei who remained in the eastern Eurasian Steppe after most Xianbei had migrated south and settled in Northern China. Genetic testing on Rourans' remains suggested Donghu-Xianbei paternal genetic contribution to Rourans.

=== Khaganate ===
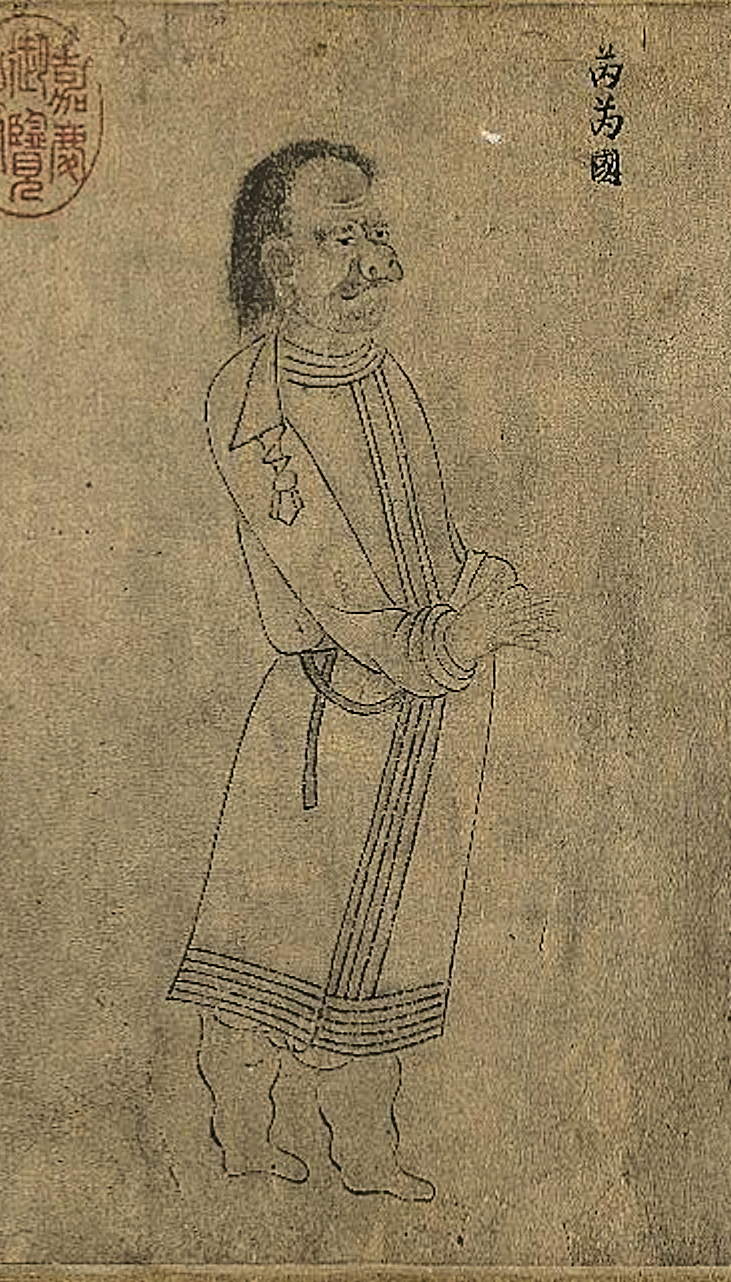
Portrait of a Rouran (芮芮國, Ruirui) ambassador by Emperor Yuan of Liang in 526–539 CE. Portraits of Periodical Offering, 10th century copy.

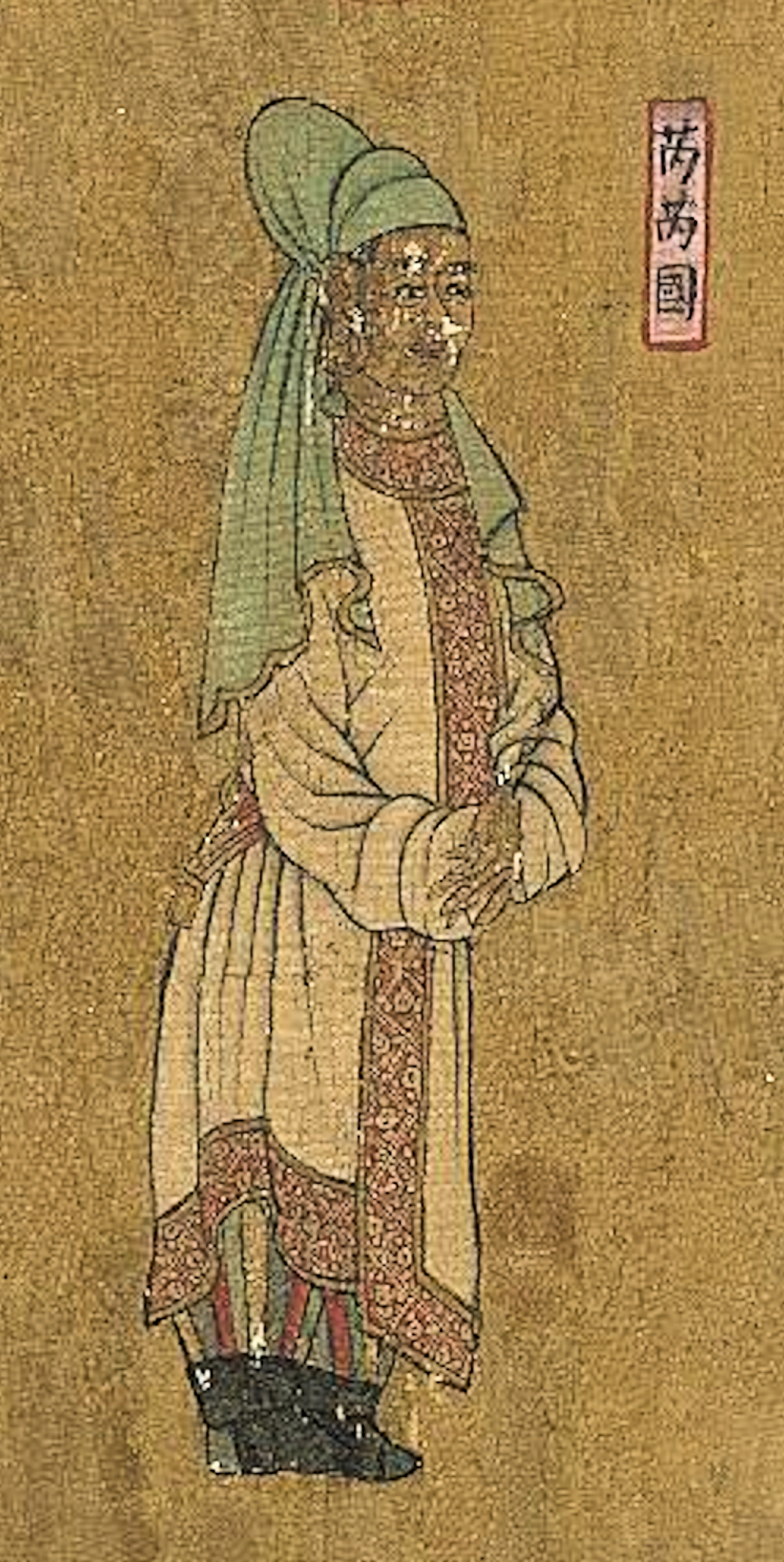
Ambassador from the Ruoran (Ruiruiguo 芮芮國) in The Gathering of Kings (王會圖), circa 650 CE

The founder of the Rouran Khaganate, Yujiulü Shelun, was descended from Mugulü, a slave of the Xianbei. Rouran women were commonly taken as wives or concubines by the Xianbei.

After the Xianbei migrated south and settled in Chinese lands during the late 3rd century AD, the Rouran made a name for themselves as fierce warriors. However they remained politically fragmented until 402 AD when Shelun gained support of all the Rouran chieftains and united the Rouran under one banner. Immediately after uniting, the Rouran entered a perpetual conflict with Northern Wei, beginning with a Wei offensive that drove the Rouran from the Ordos region. The Rouran expanded westward and defeated the neighboring Tiele people and expanded their territory over the Silk Roads, even vassalizing the Hephthalites which remained vassals until the beginning of the 5th century.

The Hepthalites migrated southeast due to pressure from the Rouran and displaced the Yuezhi in Bactria, forcing them to migrate further south. Despite the conflict between the Hephthalites and Rouran, the Hephthalites borrowed much from their eastern overlords, in particular the title of "Khan" which was first used by the Rouran as a title for their rulers.

The Rouran were considered vassals (chen) by Tuoba Wei. By 506 they were considered a vassal state (fanli). Following the growth of the Rouran and the turning of Wei into a classical Chinese state, they were considered partners of equal rights by Wei (lindi gangli).

In 424, the Rouran invaded Northern Wei but were repulsed.

In 429, Northern Wei launched a major offensive against the Rouran and killed a large number of people.

The Chinese are foot soldiers and we are horsemen. What can a herd of colts and heifers do against tigers or a pack of wolves? As for the Rouran, they graze in the north during the summer; in autumn, they come south and in winter raid our frontiers. We have only to attack them in summer in their pasture lands. At that time their horses are useless: the stallions are busy with the fillies, and the mares with their foals. If we but come upon them there and cut them off from their grazing and their water, within a few days they will be either taken or destroyed.

— Emperor Daowu of Northern Wei

In 434, the Rouran entered a marriage alliance with Northern Wei. In 443, Northern Wei attacked the Rouran. In 449, the Rouran were defeated in battle by Northern Wei. In 456, Northern Wei attacked the Rouran. In 458, Northern Wei attacked the Rouran.

In 460, the Rouran subjugated the Ashina tribe residing around modern Turpan and resettled them in the Altai Mountains. The Rouran also ousted the previous dynasty of Gaochang (the remnants of the Northern Liang) and installed Kan Bozhou as its king.

In 492, Emperor Tuoba Hong sent 70 thousand horsemen against the Rouran. The outcome of the expedition does not appear in Chinese sources. According to Nikolay Kradin, since Chinese sources don't mention the outcome of the expedition, it is probable that it was unsuccessful. Kradin notes that, possibly strained after the battle with Wei, the Rourans were not able to prevent the Uighur chief Abuzhiluo from heading "a 100 thousand tents" west, in a series of events that led to the overthrowing and killing of Doulun Khan. Two armies were sent in pursuit of the rebels, one led by Doulun, the other by Nagai, his uncle. The Rouran emerged victorious. In the war against the Uighurs, Doulan fought well, but his uncle Nagai won all the battles against the Uighurs. Thus, the soldiers thought that Heaven didn't favor Doulan anymore, and that he should be deposed in favor of Nagai. The latter declined. Nonetheless, the subjects killed Doulan and murdered his next of kin, installing Nagai on the throne. In 518, Nagai married the sorceress Diwan, conferring her the title of khagatun for her outstanding service.

Between 525 and 527, Rouran was employed by Northern Wei in the suppression of rebellions in their territory, with the Rourans then plundering the local population.

The Rouran Khaganate arranged for one of their princesses, Khagan Yujiulü Anagui's daughter Princess Ruru, to be married to the Han Chinese ruler of the Eastern Wei, Gao Huan.

=== Heqin ===
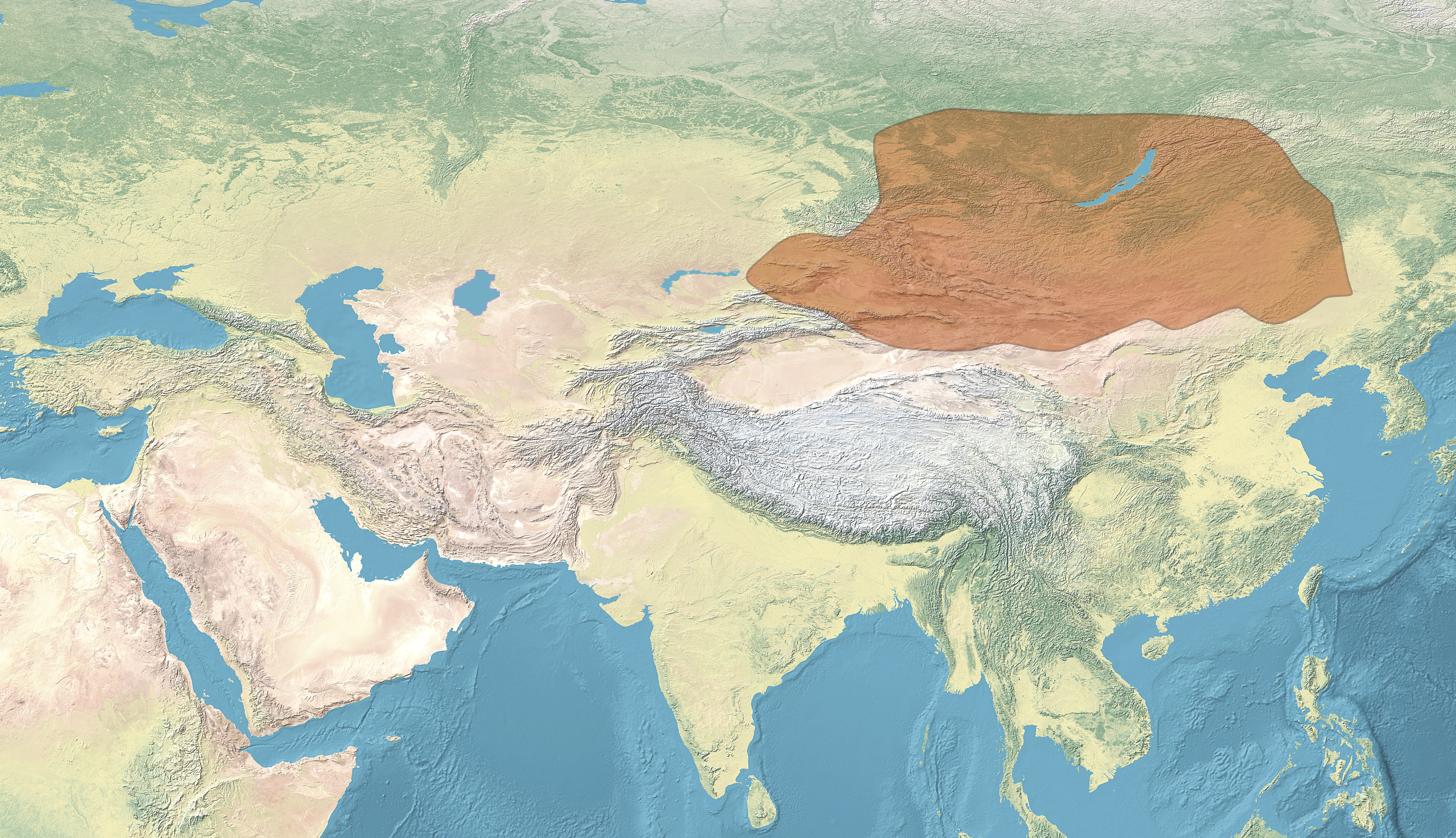
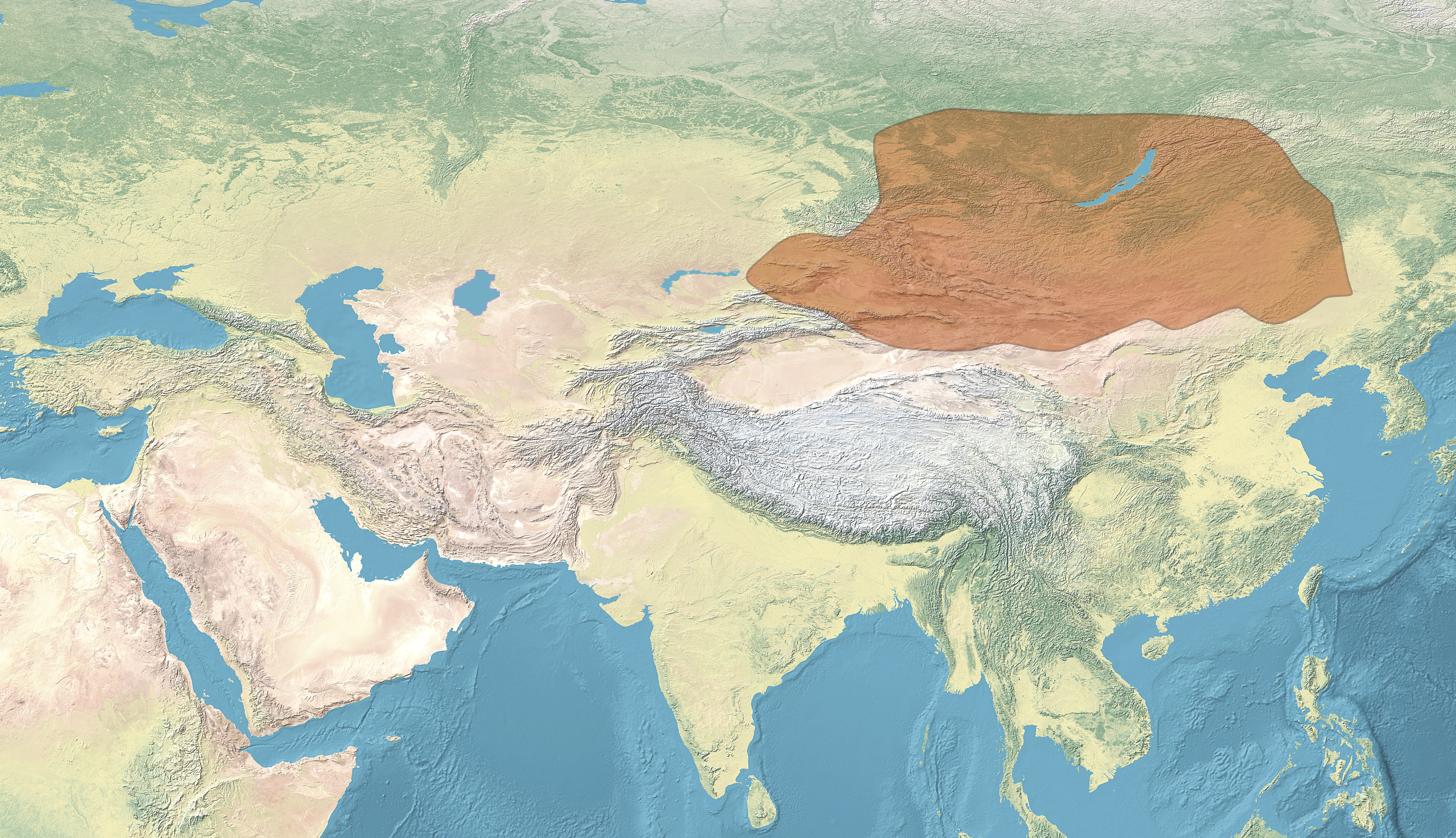
The Rouran Khaganate and contemporary continental Asian polities c. 500 CE

The Rouran were involved in many royal intermarriage (also known as heqin in China), with the Northern Yan as well as the Northern Wei dynasty and its successors Eastern and Western Wei, which were fighting each other, and each seeking the support of the Rouran to defeat the other. Both parties, in turn, took the initiative of proposing such marriages to forge important alliances or solidify relations.

In the 1970s, the Tomb of Princess Linhe was unearthed in Ci County, Hebei. It contained artistically invaluable murals, a mostly pillaged but still consistent treasure, Byzantine coins and about a thousand vessels and clay figurines. Among the latter was the figurine of a shaman, standing in a dancing posture and holding a saw-like instrument. This figurine is thought to reflect the young princess' Rouran/nomadic roots.

On one occasion, in 540, the Rourans allegedly attacked Western Wei reportedly with a million warriors because a Rouran princess reported being dissatisfied with being second to Emperor Wendi's principal wife.

The first khagan Shelun is said to have concluded a "treaty of peace based on kinship" (huoqin) with the rulers of the Jin. The royal house of Rouran is also said to have intermarried with the royal house of the Hephthalites in the 6th century.

=== Society ===
Since the time of Shelun Khan, the khans were bestowed with additional titles at their enthronement. After 464, starting with Yucheng Khan they started to use epoch names, in imitation of the Chinese. The Rouran dignitaries of the ruling elite also adopted nicknames referring to their deeds, similar to the titles the Chinese bestowed posthumously. Kradin notes that this practice is analogous with that of later Mongolian chiefs. There appears to have been a wide circle composing the nomadic aristocracy, including elders, chieftains and military commanders. The grandees could be high or low ranking. According to Kradin, the khagan could confer titles as rewards for services rendered and outstanding deeds. He cites an example of this; an event occurred in 518, when Nagai entitled the sorceress Diwai khagatun, taking her as his wife, and gave a compensation, a post and a title to Fushengmou, her then former husband. The Rouran titles included mofu, mohetu (cf. Mongolian batur, baghatur), mohe rufei (cf. Mongolian baga köbegün), hexi, sili and sili-mohe, totoufa, totouteng, sijin (cf. Turkic irkin), xielifa (cf. Turkic eltäbär).

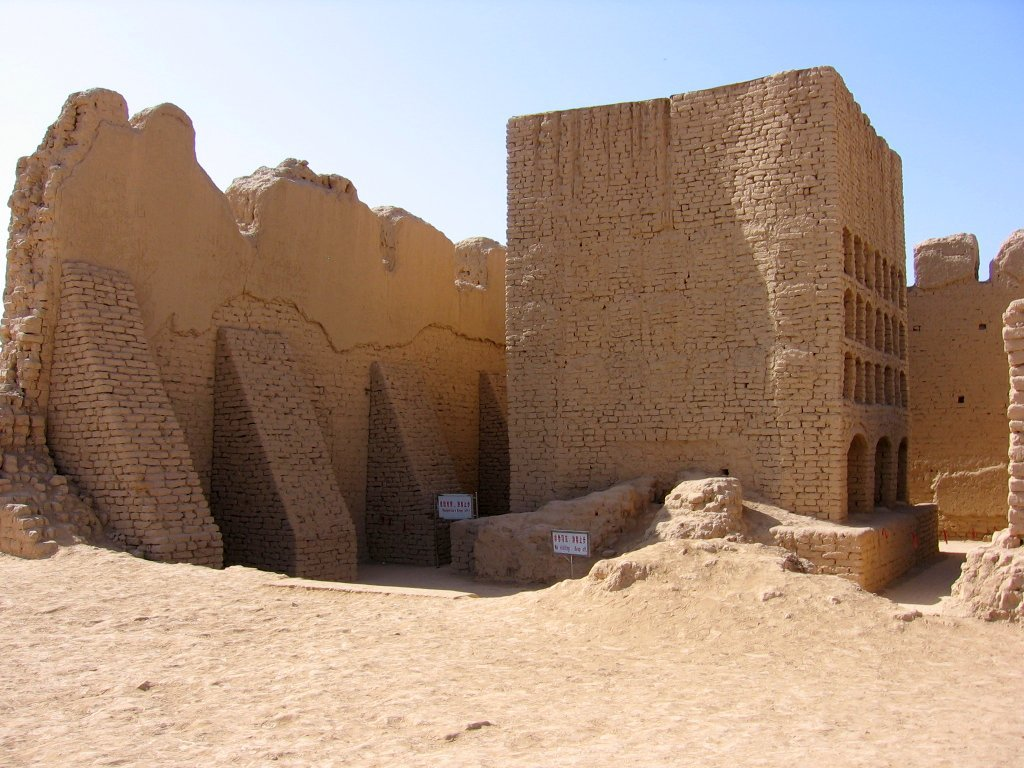
Gaochang was subjugated by the Rouran in 460.

It is known that in 521 Khagan Anagui was given two bondmaids as a gift from the Chinese, while Khagan Shelun is said to have once declared that the soldiers who fought outstandingly would receive captives. However, "there is nothing in the sources about the enslavement of prisoners of war". There is, however, evidence that the Rouran resettled people in the steppe.

Initially the Rouran chiefs, having no letters to make records, "counted approximately the number of warriors by using sheep's droppings". Later, they made records using notches on wood. A later source claims that the Rouran later adopted the Chinese written language for diplomatic relations, and under Anagui, started to write internal records. According to the same source, there were also many literate people among the Rouran by that time. Kradin notes that the level of literacy "based on the knowledge of written Chinese" was rather high, and that it didn't affect only the elite and the immigrants, but also some cattle-breeders were able to use Chinese ideograms. In the Book of Song there is a story of an educated Rouran "whose knowledge shamed a wise Chinese functionary". There is no record of monuments erected by the Rouran, though there is evidence of the latter requesting doctors, weavers and other artisans to be sent from China.

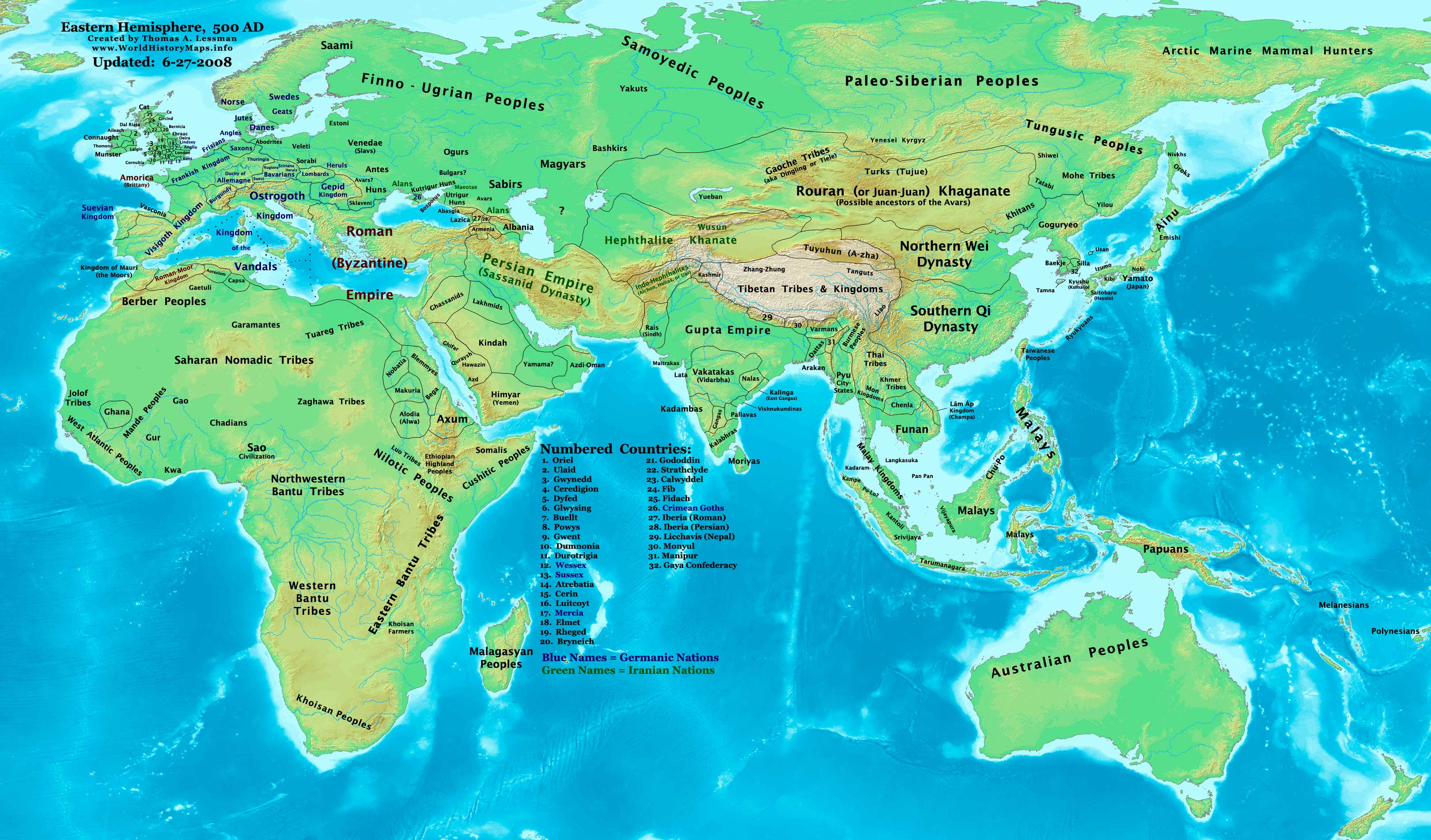
The Rouran Khaganate and main polities around 500 AD

Imitating the Chinese, Anagui Khan introduced the use of officials at court, "surrounded himself with advisers trained in the tradition of Chinese bibliophily", and adopted a staff of bodyguards, or chamberlains. Hyun Jin Kim notes a similar use of bodyguards performing the same function in the contemporary Hunnic Empire to the west. Kim also compared the "rudimentary bureaucratic organisation" of the Rourans to that of the Huns, as well as their "hierarchical, stratified structure of government". Anagui's chief advisor was the Chinese Shunyu Tan, whose role is comparable to that of Yelü Chucai with the Mongols and Zhonghang Yue with the Xiongnu (or Huns).

Recent archeological finds in Mongolia (the Urd Ulaan Uneet Burial and Khukh Nuur Burial) suggest that the Mongolic Rouran tribes had sophisticated, wooden frame saddles and iron stirrups by at least the fourth and fifth centuries AD. Radiocarbon dating of related items date them to between the 3rd century and 6th century AD. The wooden frame saddle and the iron stirrups found at these burials are one of the earliest examples found in Central and East Asia.

=== Capital ===
The capital of the Rouran likely changed over time. The headquarters of the Rouran khan (ting) was said to be initially northwest of Gansu. Later the capital of the Rouran became the legendary town of Mumocheng, said to have been "encircled with two walls constructed by Liang Shu". The existence of this city would be proof of early urbanization among the Rouran. However, no trace of it has been found so far; its location is unknown, and debated among historians.

=== Decline ===
In 461, Lü Pi, Duke of Hedong, a Northern Wei general and Grand chancellor of royal Rouran descent, died in Northern Wei. The Rouran and the Hephthalites had a falling out and problems within their confederation were encouraged by Chinese agents.

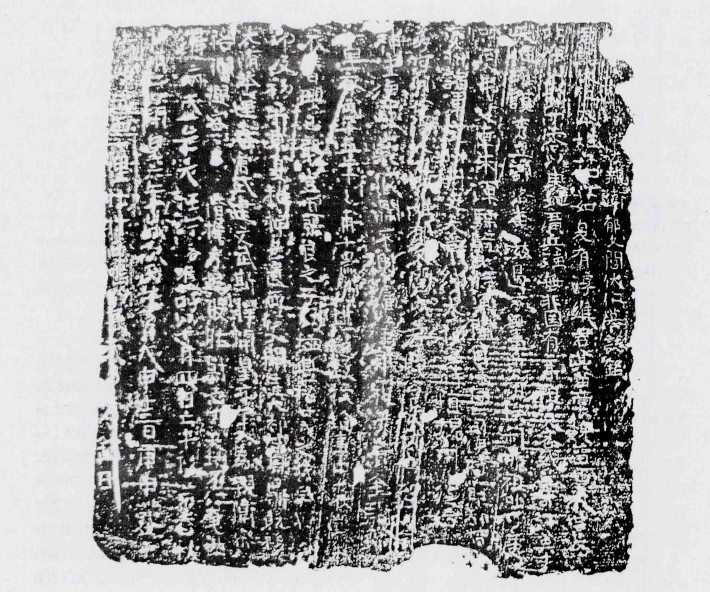
Epitaph of Yujiulü Furen (郁久闾伏仁), died on 29 November 586

In 508, the Tiele defeated the Rouran in battle. In 516, the Rouran defeated the Tiele. In 551, Bumin of the Ashina Göktürks quelled a Tiele revolt for the Rouran and asked for a Rouran princess for his service. The Rouran refused claiming that he was only a Blacksmith slave. This angered Bumin who in response declared independence.

Bumin entered a marriage alliance with Western Wei, a successor state of Northern Wei, and attacked the Rouran in 552. The Rouran, now at the peak of their might, were defeated by the Turks. After a defeat at Huaihuang (in present-day Zhangjiakou, Hebei) the last great khan Anagui, realizing he had been defeated, took his own life. Bumin declared himself Illig Khagan of the Turkic Khaganate after conquering Otuken; Bumin died soon after and his son Issik Qaghan succeeded him. Issik continued attacking the Rouran, their khaganate now fallen into decay, but died a year later in 553.

In 555, Turks invaded and occupied the Rouran and Yujiulü Dengshuzi led 3,000 soldiers in retreat to Western Wei. He was later delivered to Turks by Emperor Gong with his soldiers under pressure from Muqan Qaghan. In the same year, Muqan annihilated the Rouran. All the Rouran handed over to the Turks, reportedly with the exception of children under sixteen, were brutally killed.

On 29 November 586, Yujiulü Furen (郁久闾伏仁), an official of Sui and a descendant of the ruling clan, died in Hebei, leaving an epitaph reporting his royal descent from the Yujiulü clan.

== Possible descendants ==
=== Tatars ===
According to Xu (2005), some Rouran remnants fled to the northwest of the Greater Khingan mountain range, and renamed themselves 大檀 Dàtán (MC: *da^{H}-dan) or 檀檀 Tántán (MC: *dan-dan) after Tantan, the personal name of a historical Rouran Khagan. Tantan were gradually incorporated into the Shiwei tribal complex and later emerged as Great-Da Shiwei (大室韋) in Suishu. Klyashtorny, apud Golden (2013), reconstructed 大檀 / 檀檀 as *tatar / dadar, "the people who, [Klyashtorny] concludes, assisted Datan in the 420s in his internal struggles and who later are noted as the Otuz Tatar ("Thirty Tatars") who were among the mourners at the funeral of Bumın Qağan (see the inscriptions of Kül Tegin, E4 and Bilge Qağan, E5)".

=== Avars ===
Some scholars claim that the Rouran then fled west across the steppes and became the Avars, though many other scholars contest this claim. New genetic data seem to answer that question, says Walter Pohl, a historian at the University of Vienna. "We have a very clear indication that they must have come from the core of the Rouran Empire. They were the neighbors of the Chinese." "Genetically speaking, the elite Avars have a very, very eastern profile," says Choongwon Jeong, a co-author and a geneticist at Seoul National University.

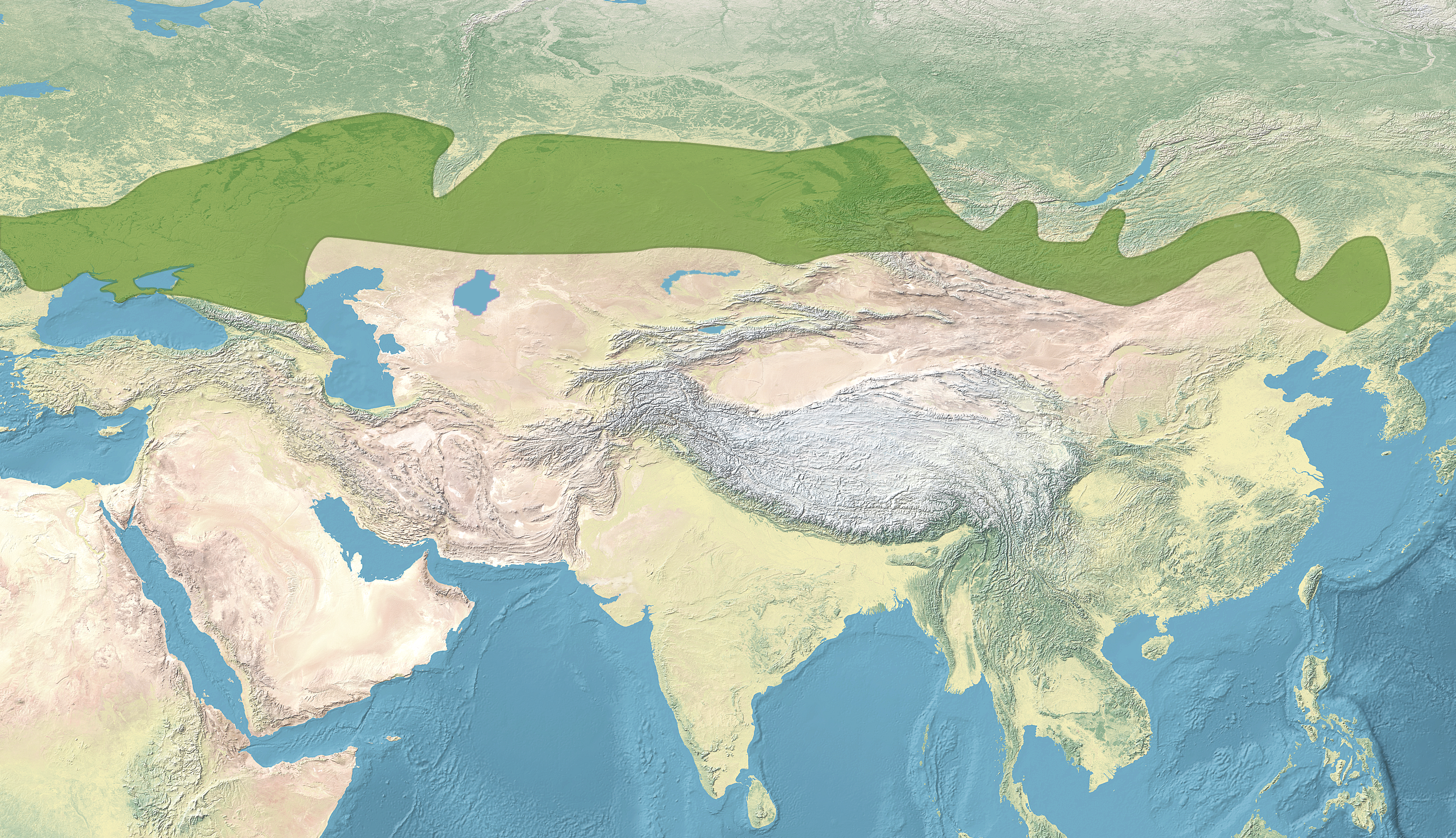
The Eurasian Steppe Belt (in on the map), the Rouran Khaganate, and main contemporary continental Asian polities circa 400 CE. Towards the east of the Steppe Belt, the rise of the powerful Rouran Khaganate may have encouraged the migration of the Huns to the west. On the other hand, other historians have noted a high synchronicity between the "reign of terror" of Attila in the west and the southern expansion of the Hephthalites, a vassal state of the Rourans, with extensive territorial overlap between the Huns and the Hephthalites in Central Asia.

That genetic data backs up two historical accounts of the Avar's origins. One sixth century Chinese source describes an enigmatic steppe people called the Rouran, one of many horse-riding nomadic groups attack their northern borders from the Mongolian steppes. The Rouran's grassland empire was reportedly defeated by rival nomads in 552. In 567, diplomats from the Eastern Roman Empire reported the arrival of a new group from the east on the shores of the Caspian Sea. The newcomers called themselves the Avars, and claimed to be related to a far-off people known as the Rouran.

However, it's unlikely that Rouran would have migrated to Europe in any sufficient strength to establish themselves there, due to the desperate resistances, military disasters, and massacres. The remainder of the Rouran fled into China, were absorbed into the border guards, and disappeared as an entity. The last khagan fled to the court of the Western Wei, but at the demand of the Göktürks, Western Wei executed him and the nobles who accompanied him.

The Avars were pursued west by the Göktürks as fugitives and accused them of unlawfully usurping the imperial title of khagan and also the prestigious name of the Avars. Contemporary sources indicate the Avars were not native to the Western Steppe but came to the region after a long wandering. Nor were they native to Central Asia to the south of which lay the Hephthalite Empire which has on and off been identified with the Avars by certain scholars. Instead the Avars' origins were further to the east, a fact which has been corroborated through DNA studies of Avar individuals buried in the Pannonian Basin which have shown that they were primarily East Asian. Their pretensions to empire despite their relatively small numbers indicate descendance from a previously hegemonic power in the Far East. The first embassy of the Avars to Justinian I in 557 corresponds directly to the fall of the Rouran Khaganate in 555. The Rouran Khaganate had fallen not through gradual decline but through a sudden internal revolution led by the Göktürks, hence the still vivid memories of empire in the Avar Khagan, a fact paralleled later by the Kara-Khitans who migrated a long distance west after being suddenly dislodged from northern China but still kept their pretensions to empire and defeated the Great Seljuk Empire in the Battle of Qatwan as the Western Liao. The Hephthalite Empire in southern Central Asia would not fall to the Göktürks until 560. The Hephthalites themselves had previously been vassals to the Rouran and adopted the title khagan from them. They were also already known as the Hephthalites to the Byzantines. In view of these facts a strong Rouran component in the Avar Khaganate has been seen as likely, although the khaganate later included many other peoples such as Slavs and Goths.

== Genetics ==
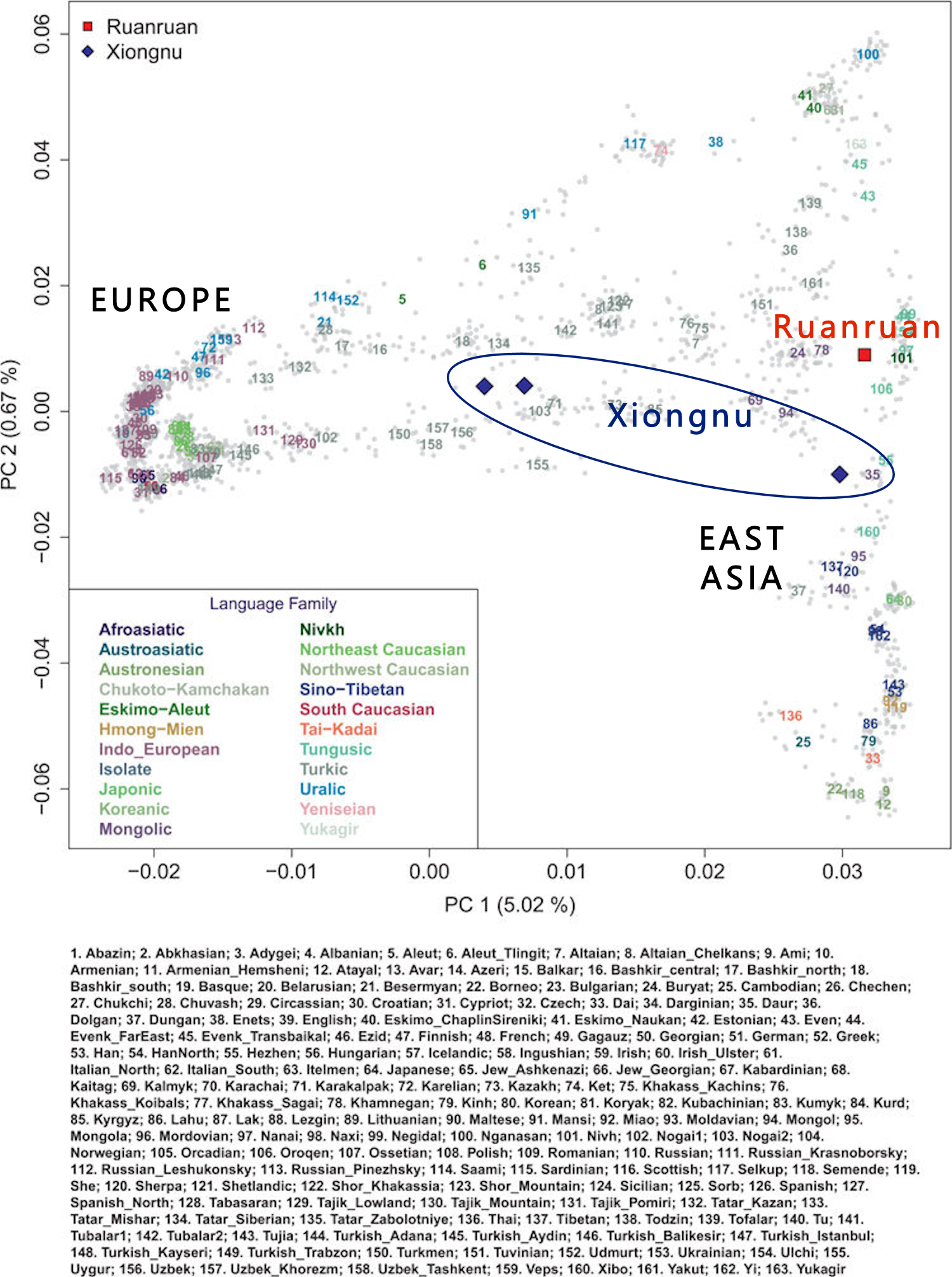
Component analysis of the Ruanruan ( ) and the Xiongnu ( ) against modern population ( ). The Rouran are closest to modern East Asian populations such as the Buryats, the Oroqen or the Mongols.

Li et al. 2018 examined the remains of a Rouran male buried at the Khermen Tal site in Mongolia. He was found to be a carrier of the paternal haplogroup C2b1a1b and the maternal haplogroup D4b1a2a1. Haplogroup C2b1a1b has also been detected among the Xiongnu, Xianbei and Göktürks.

Several genetic studies have shown that early Pannonian Avar elites carried a large amount of East Asian ancestry, and some have suggested this as evidence for a connection between the Pannonian Avars and the earlier Rouran. However, Savelyev & Jeong 2020 notes that there is still little genetic data on the Rouran themselves, and that their genetic relationship with the Pannonian Avars therefore still remains inconclusive.

== Language ==
The Rouran state was undoubtedly multi-ethnic, but there is no definite evidence as to their language. The received view is that the relationships of the language remain a puzzle and that it may be an isolate. Alexander Vovin (2004, 2010) considered the Rouran language to be an extinct non-Altaic language that is not related to any modern-day language (i.e., a language isolate) and is hence unrelated to Mongolic. Vovin (2004) notes that Old Turkic had borrowed some words from an unknown non-Altaic language that may have been Rouran. In 2018 Vovin changed his opinion after new evidence was found through the analysis of the Brāhmī Bugut and Khüis Tolgoi inscriptions and suggests that the Rouran language was in fact a Mongolic language, close but not identical to Middle Mongolian. According to Alexander Savelyev and Choongwon Jeong the identification of Brāhmī Bugut and Khüis Tolgoi with the Rouran language remains problematic because of the dating. They further write According to Vovin (2019a), the Brāhmī Bugut inscription is dated to ca. 584–587 AD, and the Khüis Tolgoi inscription must have been erected between 604 and 620 AD. As both were created several decades after the Rouran Khaganate had been destroyed, it is unsafe to make conclusions on the composition of the Rouran population, or its elite, on the basis of these inscriptions.

== Rulers of the Rouran ==
The Rourans were the first people who used the titles khagan and khan for their emperors, replacing the chanyu of the Xiongnu. The etymology of the title chanyu is controversial: there are Mongolic, Turkic, and Yeniseian versions.

=== Tribal chiefs ===
1. Mugulü, 4th century
2. Yujiulü Cheluhui, 4th century
3. Yujiulü Tunugui, 4th century
4. Yujiulü Bati, 4th century
5. Yujiulü Disuyuan, 4th century
6. Yujiulü Pihouba, 4th century
7. Yujiulü Wenheti, 4th century
8. Yujiulü Heduohan, 4th century

=== Khagans ===
Personal name	Regnal name	Reign	Era names
Yujiulü Shelun	Qiudoufa Khagan (丘豆伐可汗)	402–410	
Yujiulü Hulü	Aikugai Khagan (藹苦蓋可汗)	410–414	
Yujiulü Buluzhen		414	
Yujiulü Datan	Mouhanheshenggai Khagan (牟汗紇升蓋可汗)	414–429	
Yujiulü Wuti	Chilian Khagan (敕連可汗)	429–444	
Yujiulü Tuhezhen	Chu Khagan (處可汗)	444–464	
Yujiulü Yucheng	Shouluobuzhen Khagan (受羅部真可)	464–485	Yongkang (永康)
Yujiulü Doulun	Fugudun Khagan (伏古敦可汗)	485–492	Taiping (太平)
Yujiulü Nagai	Houqifudaikezhe Khagan (侯其伏代庫者可汗)	492–506	Taian (太安)
Yujiulü Futu	Tuohan Khagan (佗汗可汗)	506–508	Shiping (始平)
Yujiulü Chounu	Douluofubadoufa Khagan (豆羅伏跋豆伐可汗)	508–520	Jianchang (建昌)
Yujiulü Anagui	Chiliantoubingdoufa Khagan (敕連頭兵豆伐可汗)	520–521	
Yujiulü Poluomen	Mioukesheju Khagan (彌偶可社句可汗)	521–524	
Yujiulü Anagui	Chiliantoubingdoufa Khagan (敕連頭兵豆伐)	522–552	

==== Khagans of West ====
1. Yujiulü Dengshuzi, 555

==== Khagans of East ====
1. Yujiulü Tiefa, 552–553
2. Yujiulü Dengzhu, 553
3. Yujiulü Kangti, 553
4. Yujiulü Anluochen, 553–554

== Rulers family tree ==
The family tree of the Khaghans of the Rouran

Mugulü 木骨闾
Cheluhui 车鹿会
Tunugui 吐奴傀
Bati 跋提
Disuyuan 地粟袁
Wenheti 缊纥提	Pihouba 匹候跋	Puhun 僕渾
□	Jiguizhi 诘归之	Shelun 社崘 ?-402–410	Hulü 斛律 ?-410–414	Héduōhàn 曷多汗 ?-?–402	Qiba 启拔	Wujie 吴颉	Lü Dafei 闾大肥	Lu; Dàníbèiyí 闾大埿倍颐	Lu Lín 闾驎
Buluzhen 步鹿真 ?–414	Duba 度拔	Shèba 社拔 ?–414	Zhāoyí 昭仪	Feng Ba 馮跋 (d. 430)	Datan 大檀 ?-414–429	Tāw; Wúluhú 他吾无鹿胡	Pili 匹黎	Lu Fèng 闾凤
Princess; Xihai 西海公主	Wuti 吴提 ?-429–444	Tulugui 秃鹿傀	Qǐlièguī 乞列归	Qilifu 俟力弗	Lu; Zuǒzhāoyí 闾左昭仪	Emperor; Taiwu 北魏太武帝; 408–452
Tuhezhen 吐贺真 ?-444–464	Emperor; Tuoba Yu 拓拔余
Yucheng 予成 ?-464–485	Nagai 那盖 ?-492–506
Doulun 豆仑 ?-485–492	Dengshuzi 邓叔子 ?-553–555	Futu 伏图 ?-506–508	□	□
Chounu 丑奴 ?-508–520	Qínifa 俟匿伐	Anagui 阿那瓌 ?-520–552	Zuhui 祖惠	Yǐjufa 乙居伐 ?–520	Tahan 塔寒	Tutujiā 秃突佳	Poluomen 婆羅門 ?-521–525	Dengzhu 登注俟利 ?-552–553
Wen of Western Wei; 507–535–551	Empress; Dao 悼皇后; 525–540	Anluochen 庵罗辰 ?-553–554	Lanling of Eastern Wei 乐安公主	Princess; Ruru 蠕蠕公主	Gao Cheng 高澄 (521–549)	Kangti 库提 ?–553	Tiefa 铁伐 ?-552–553
Lu; Chidelian 郁久閭叱地連; 537–550	Wucheng of Northern Qi; 537–569	Gao Shi 高氏
□
Yujiulü Furen; Died on 29 November 586

== See also ==
- History of the eastern steppe
