= Yujiulü Dengshuzi =

Khagan of Rouran
- Reign: March 553 – 555
- Predecessor: Yujiulü Anagui
- Successor: Invasion by First Turkic Khaganate
- Died: 555; Chang'an, Western Wei
- House: Yujiulü clan
- Father: Yujiulü Nagai
- Religion: Buddhism

Yujiulü Dengshuzi (Chinese: 郁久閭鄧叔子; pinyin: Yùjiǔlǘ Dèngshūzǐ) (?–555) was the last western khagan of the Rouran. He was a cousin of Yujiulü Anagui.

== Reign ==
Yujiulü Dengshuzi was enthroned in March 553 by remnants of the Rouran with the support of the Western Wei in Woye (modern northern part of Ulansuhai Nur, Urad, Inner Mongolia). In 555, the Tujue invaded and occupied the Rouran and Dengshuzi led 3,000 soldiers in retreat to the Western Wei. He was later delivered to Turks by Emperor Gong with his soldiers under pressure from Muqan Qaghan.

| Preceded by Yujiulü Anagui | Khagan of the Rouran; 553–555 | Succeeded by none |
