= Princess Lanling =

Chinese princess

Princess Le'an (樂安公主)
- Born: 6th century Luoyang, Henan
- Spouse: Yujiulü Anluochen
Regnal name
- Princess Lanling (蘭陵公主)
- Father: Member of the Imperial House of Eastern Wei

Princess Le'an (Chinese: 樂安公主), also Princess Lanling (Chinese: 蘭陵公主) (fl. 530s), was the consort of the Rouran khagan Yujiulü Anluochen. She was born into the imperial house of the Eastern Wei dynasty and was a descendant of Tuoba Yulü of the Dai dynasty and of Empress Pingwen. She was the sister of Yuan Zhi, also Chang shanwang yuan ming (常山王元鸣).

== Biography ==
Princess Lanling was a native of Luoyang County, Henan (now east of Luoyang, Henan Province), a descendant of Tuoba Yulü. She was the sister of Yuan Zhi, or Chang shanwang yuan ming (常山王元鸣).

She was married to Anluochen, the khan of the Rourans, the son of Anagui. A thousand horses were sent from Rouran to the Emperor of Eastern Wei, Xiaojing, asking for the hand of the princess who, following her marriage with Anluochen, adopted the royal name of Princess Lanling (兰陵公主). In view of the importance of an alliance with the Rouran, Gao Huan personally presided the collection of the dowry and led the princess and her retinue to Rouran.

== Sources ==
- Book of Wei, ·蠕蠕传.
