= Guyang County =

Guyang County 固阳县 • ᠭᠦᠶᠠᠩ ᠰᠢᠶᠠᠨ Kuyang
- County
- Location in Inner Mongolia Guyang (China)
- Coordinates: 41°01′N 110°04′E
- Country: China
- Autonomous region: Inner Mongolia
- Prefecture-level city: Baotou
- County seat: Jinshan

Area
  - Total: 4,981 km^{2} (1,923 sq mi)
- Elevation: 1,353 m (4,439 ft)

Population (2020)
  - Total: 118,624
  - Density: 23.82/km^{2} (61.68/sq mi)
- Time zone: UTC+8 (China Standard)
- Website: www.guyang.gov.cn

Guyang County

Chinese name
- Simplified Chinese: 固阳县
- Traditional Chinese: 固陽縣
Transcriptions
Standard Mandarin
- Hanyu Pinyin: Gùyáng Xiàn

Mongolian name
- Mongolian Cyrillic: Гүян шянь
- Mongolian script: ᠭᠦᠶᠠᠩ ᠰᠢᠶᠠᠨ
Transcriptions
- SASM/GNC: Güyaŋ siyan

Guyang County (Mongolian: ᠭᠦᠶᠠᠩ ᠰᠢᠶᠠᠨ; Chinese: 固阳县) is a county in western Inner Mongolia, China. It is under the administration of Baotou City, the downtown of which is 44 kilometres (27 mi) to the south-southwest.

== Administrative divisions ==
Guyang County is made up of 6 towns.

Name	Simplified Chinese	Hanyu Pinyin	Mongolian (Hudum Script)	Mongolian (Cyrillic)	Administrative division code
Towns
Jinshan Town	金山镇	Jīnshān Zhèn	ᠵᠢᠨᠱᠠᠨ ᠪᠠᠯᠭᠠᠰᠤ	Зуншин балгас	150222102
Xidoupu Town	西斗铺镇	Xīdòupù Zhèn	ᠰᠢ ᠳ᠋ᠧᠦ ᠫᠦ᠋ ᠪᠠᠯᠭᠠᠰᠤ	Ший дүү пү балгас	150222103
Xiashihao Town	下湿壕镇	Xiàshīháo Zhèn	ᠰᠢᠶᠠ ᠱᠢ ᠬᠣᠤ ᠪᠠᠯᠭᠠᠰᠤ	Шье ши хоо балгас	150222104
Yinhao Town	银号镇	Yínhào Zhèn	ᠶᠢᠨ ᠬᠣᠤ ᠪᠠᠯᠭᠠᠰᠤ	Ин хоо балгас	150222105
Huaishuo Town	怀朔镇	Huáishuò Zhèn	ᠬᠤᠸᠠᠢ ᠱᠦᠸᠧ ᠪᠠᠯᠭᠠᠰᠤ	Хуай шүве балгас	150222106
Xingshunxi Town	兴顺西镇	Xīngshùnxī Zhèn	ᠰᠢᠩ ᠱᠦᠨ ᠰᠢ ᠪᠠᠯᠭᠠᠰᠤ	Шин шөн ший балгас	150222107

== Climate ==
Climate data for Guyang, elevation 1,403 m (4,603 ft), (1991–2020 normals, extremes 1981–2010)
Month	Jan	Feb	Mar	Apr	May	Jun	Jul	Aug	Sep	Oct	Nov	Dec	Year
Record high °C (°F)	6.8 (44.2)	15.5 (59.9)	22.4 (72.3)	31.5 (88.7)	33.6 (92.5)	38.6 (101.5)	37.8 (100.0)	34.5 (94.1)	33.5 (92.3)	25.3 (77.5)	16.6 (61.9)	10.0 (50.0)	38.6 (101.5)
Mean daily maximum °C (°F)	−5.4 (22.3)	−0.4 (31.3)	6.9 (44.4)	15.3 (59.5)	21.8 (71.2)	26.6 (79.9)	28.5 (83.3)	26.3 (79.3)	20.9 (69.6)	13.3 (55.9)	3.7 (38.7)	−4.1 (24.6)	12.8 (55.0)
Daily mean °C (°F)	−13.5 (7.7)	−8.5 (16.7)	−0.8 (30.6)	7.9 (46.2)	14.8 (58.6)	20.1 (68.2)	22.2 (72.0)	19.9 (67.8)	14.0 (57.2)	5.9 (42.6)	−3.6 (25.5)	−11.4 (11.5)	5.6 (42.1)
Mean daily minimum °C (°F)	−19.3 (−2.7)	−14.8 (5.4)	−7.4 (18.7)	0.3 (32.5)	7.2 (45.0)	12.9 (55.2)	15.9 (60.6)	13.9 (57.0)	7.9 (46.2)	−0.1 (31.8)	−8.9 (16.0)	−16.8 (1.8)	−0.8 (30.6)
Record low °C (°F)	−33.2 (−27.8)	−29.4 (−20.9)	−25.5 (−13.9)	−14.0 (6.8)	−5.4 (22.3)	0.3 (32.5)	6.7 (44.1)	2.6 (36.7)	−4.6 (23.7)	−13.5 (7.7)	−25.0 (−13.0)	−30.3 (−22.5)	−33.2 (−27.8)
Average precipitation mm (inches)	2.0 (0.08)	3.4 (0.13)	6.0 (0.24)	10.2 (0.40)	28.0 (1.10)	35.0 (1.38)	82.5 (3.25)	67.7 (2.67)	45.1 (1.78)	13.7 (0.54)	6.4 (0.25)	2.8 (0.11)	302.8 (11.93)
Average precipitation days (≥ 0.1 mm)	2.6	2.8	3.1	3.0	5.7	8.7	11.6	10.4	7.7	4.1	3.1	2.7	65.5
Average snowy days	4.0	4.0	3.9	1.7	0.3	0	0	0	0	1.3	3.8	4.4	23.4
Average relative humidity (%)	60	52	43	35	36	43	54	59	56	54	57	60	51
Mean monthly sunshine hours	210.3	210.2	254.7	270.2	288.8	274.5	271.2	263.9	239.3	242.8	206.4	198.1	2,930.4
Percentage possible sunshine	70	69	68	67	64	61	60	63	65	72	71	69	67
Source: China Meteorological Administration
