= Ci County =

Ci County 磁县
- County
- Location in Hebei
- Coordinates: 36°22′N 114°23′E
- Country: People's Republic of China
- Province: Hebei
- Prefecture-level city: Handan
- Time zone: UTC+8 (China Standard)

Ci County or Cixian (simplified Chinese: 磁县; traditional Chinese: 磁縣; pinyin: Cí Xiàn) is a county of Hebei, China. It is under the administration of Handan City.

== Administrative Divisions ==
Towns:

- Cizhou (磁州镇), Xiguanglu (西光禄镇), Gaoyu (高臾镇), Yuecheng (岳城镇), Guantai (观台镇), Lintan (林坦镇), Huangsha (黄沙镇), Baitu (白土镇), Jiangwucheng (讲武城镇)

Townships:

- Lucunying Township (路村营乡), Guyi Township (固义乡), Xinzhuangying Township (辛庄营乡), Huaguanying Township (花官营乡), Shicunying Township (时村营乡), Nancheng Township (南城乡), Taicheng Township (台城乡), Taoquan Township (陶泉乡), Dudang Township (都党乡), Jiabi Township (贾璧乡)

== Climate ==
Climate data for Cixian, elevation 87 m (285 ft), (1991–2020 normals, extremes 1981–2010)
Month	Jan	Feb	Mar	Apr	May	Jun	Jul	Aug	Sep	Oct	Nov	Dec	Year
Record high °C (°F)	18.3 (64.9)	26.7 (80.1)	28.7 (83.7)	34.3 (93.7)	37.8 (100.0)	43.4 (110.1)	41.2 (106.2)	36.3 (97.3)	38.9 (102.0)	33.8 (92.8)	28.2 (82.8)	25.0 (77.0)	43.4 (110.1)
Mean daily maximum °C (°F)	4.2 (39.6)	8.7 (47.7)	15.0 (59.0)	21.3 (70.3)	26.9 (80.4)	32.5 (90.5)	32.1 (89.8)	30.2 (86.4)	26.9 (80.4)	21.3 (70.3)	12.7 (54.9)	6.0 (42.8)	19.8 (67.7)
Daily mean °C (°F)	−1.6 (29.1)	2.2 (36.0)	8.5 (47.3)	15.1 (59.2)	20.8 (69.4)	26.0 (78.8)	27.1 (80.8)	25.5 (77.9)	20.9 (69.6)	14.8 (58.6)	6.6 (43.9)	0.3 (32.5)	13.9 (56.9)
Mean daily minimum °C (°F)	−6.1 (21.0)	−2.8 (27.0)	2.7 (36.9)	8.9 (48.0)	14.5 (58.1)	19.8 (67.6)	22.8 (73.0)	21.4 (70.5)	15.9 (60.6)	9.5 (49.1)	1.7 (35.1)	−3.9 (25.0)	8.7 (47.7)
Record low °C (°F)	−21.2 (−6.2)	−19.2 (−2.6)	−10.4 (13.3)	−2.3 (27.9)	2.3 (36.1)	8.3 (46.9)	15.4 (59.7)	12.1 (53.8)	4.2 (39.6)	−3.4 (25.9)	−17.8 (0.0)	−18.1 (−0.6)	−21.2 (−6.2)
Average precipitation mm (inches)	3.2 (0.13)	7.5 (0.30)	9.7 (0.38)	29.7 (1.17)	37.3 (1.47)	56.1 (2.21)	159.5 (6.28)	107 (4.2)	49.2 (1.94)	27.9 (1.10)	15.9 (0.63)	3.9 (0.15)	506.9 (19.96)
Average precipitation days (≥ 0.1 mm)	1.9	2.9	3.0	5.3	6.6	8.2	11.4	9.9	7.2	5.6	4.0	2.2	68.2
Average snowy days	2.8	2.8	1.0	0.2	0	0	0	0	0	0	1.1	2.4	10.3
Average relative humidity (%)	63	59	57	63	65	61	77	82	76	70	70	66	67
Mean monthly sunshine hours	125.3	137.3	189.7	218.9	245.7	218.8	183.1	190.0	175.0	170.9	139.9	131.6	2,126.2
Percentage possible sunshine	40	44	51	55	56	50	41	46	48	50	46	44	48
Source: China Meteorological Administration

== Notable natives ==
- Huang Hua, former Minister of Foreign Affairs
