= Yujiulü Anagui =

Khagan of Rouran
- Reign: 520–521
- Predecessor: Yujiulü Chounu
- Successor: Yujiulü Poluomen

Khagan of Rouran
- Reign: 522–552
- Predecessor: Yujiulü Poluomen
- Successor: Yujiulü Tiefa (in east); Yujiulü Dengshuzi (in west)
- Born: 472
- Died: 552 (aged 79–80)
- Issue: Yujiulü Anluochen; Empress Yujiulü
Regnal name
- Chìliántóuqīudòufá Kèhán (敕連頭丘豆伐可汗); Tengridü Kötölber Qaγan; All Ruling Khagan
- House: Yujiulü clan
- Father: Yujiulü Futu
- Mother: Houlüling (候呂陵)
- Religion: Buddhism

Yujiulü Anagui (Rouran: Ańakay; Chinese: 郁久閭阿那瓌; pinyin: Yùjiǔlǘ Ānàguī) (?–552) was a ruler of the Rouran (520–552) and had the title of Chiliantouqiudoufa Khagan (敕連頭丘豆伐可汗; Rouran: Tengridü Kötölber Qaγan).

== Biography ==
=== First reign ===
Yujiulü Anagui's reign as khagan of the Rouran started with trouble. A rebellion started ten days of his coronation when his brother-in-law Qilifa Shifa (俟力發示發) rose against him, killing Anagui's younger brother Yujiulü Yijufa (郁久閭乙居伐) and his mother Hou Lüling (侯呂陵). This paved the way for Anagui's cousin Yujiulü Poluomen to take over the Rouran. Having lost the fight, Anagui fled to the Northern Wei. Emperor Xiaoming sheltered him and ordered his advisors to bring him to his palace. As Anagui asked for troops to regain his throne, the Emperor recognized him but postponed going to war. Anagui was restless and bribed Yuan Cha to leave the capital. The Emperor suddenly changed his mind as Anagui was about to leave in 521 and helped him from a martial and economic perspective.

=== Second reign ===
Back in the Rouran, Qilifa Shifa this time opposed Yujiulü Poluomen, invading his domain. Poluomen's further defeat by the Gaoche forced the Northern Wei to divide Rouran between Anagui and Poluomen to establish stability. Anagui resided in Huaishuo (modern Guyang, Inner Mongolia), while Poluomen ruled from Xihai (modern Ejin, Inner Mongolia). Poluomen fled to the Hephthalites in 524, but was arrested and brought to the Northern Wei court, who executed him and made Anagui ruler of both parts of the khaganate. Swaying into Chinese influence, Anagui reformed the Rouran with Chinese bureaucracy and made a Han Chinese his chancellor. In 522, he asked for millet for sowing and received 10,000 bags from China. However his agricultural project didn't work out, so in 523 he started to raiding Wei frontier towns due to hunger.

In 525, he answered Wei's call for suppressing a revolt in the Six Garrisons with a 100,000 strong Rouran army, plundering rebellious people. He tried to maintain balance between Wei and Liang in the following years, sending gifts to both parties. He asked for a princess in marriage in 533, a request that was accepted. Emperor Xiaowu sent a cousin of his, Princess Lanling (蘭陵公主) as his bride. In 535, he managed to get another princess for his family, this time to his brother Yujiulü Tahan (郁久閭塔寒), who was married to Princess Huazheng (化政公主), a daughter of the Northern Wei official Yuan Yi (元翌). He also forced Emperor Wen to divorce Empress Yifu and marry Yujiulü Anagui's daughter who was then made Empress Yujiulü. For a while, this brought peace with the Rouran. In 540, Empress Yujiulü was pregnant when the Rouran launched a major attack on the Western Wei — causing Western Wei officials to believe that the attack was launched because she was jealous of the former Empress Yifu, who was by then a Buddhist nun. Emperor Wen, under pressure, ordered Empress Yifu to commit suicide. Later that year, when Empress Yujiulü herself was about to give birth, she heard unusual barking noises in the palace, and she suspected them to be from the spirit of Empress Yifu. She therefore grew depressed, and died either during or shortly after childbirth in 540.

The Eastern Wei regent Gao Huan skillfully used this opportunity, sent Zhang Weiquan, who transmitted a letter to the Anagui. The letter said that Yuwen Tai killed Emperor Wen, poisoned the empress and wanted to destroy the Rouran. At a military council, the nobles of the Rouran spoke in favor of recognizing the Eastern Wei. Anagui paid a small tribute in recognition of the Eastern Wei. After lengthy negotiations, Gao Huan decided to send Princess Le'an (樂安公主) for Yujiulü Anluochen. In 541, the Anagui sent 1,000 horses and asked to bring the princess, who was now renamed Princess Lanling (蘭陵公主). In view of the importance of an alliance with the Rouran, Gao Huan personally presided the collection of the dowry and led the princess and her retinue to Rouran. Anagui was very pleased with the marriage. This year he also ended the Gaoche threat.

The alliance with the Eastern Wei was quite bountiful. Now northern China was weakened by the civil war between Western and Eastern Wei and the Rouran didn't fear devastating invasions of their lands. Population increased and Anagui became one of the strongest rulers in the region. His Han Chinese secretary persuaded him not to sign his messages as a vassal – but as an equal sovereign. Anagui often switched sides.

In the fall of 545, due to an agreement between the Western Wei and Rouran to attack the Eastern Wei, Gao Huan sued for peace with the Rouran by requesting a marriage between a daughter of Anagui and Gao Cheng. Anagui refused, stating that it would only be sufficient if Gao Huan himself married her. Gao Huan himself initially refused, but Princess Lou, Gao Cheng and Wei Jing all persuaded him otherwise, and he married Yujiulü Anagui's daughter, referring to her as the Princess Ruru (蠕蠕公主). To facilitate this marriage, Princess Lou moved out of the mansion, but Gao Huan and Princess Lou were not formally divorced.

In 546, his bannerman Ashina Tumen suppressed a Tiele revolt against the Rouran. Following this, Tumen felt entitled to request a Rouran princess as his wife. Anagui sent an emissary to Tumen to rebuke him, saying, "You are my blacksmith slave. How dare you utter these words?". Tumen got angry, killed Anagui's emissary, and severed relations with the Rouran Khaganate and started an open revolt with help of Yuwen Tai.

=== Death and succession ===
Some time between February 11 and March 10, 552, Anagui was defeated by Tumen in the north of Huaihuang (in present-day Zhangjiakou, Hebei) and committed suicide. Following the defeat, Anagui's son Anluochen fled to Northern Qi, while his uncle Yujiulü Dengshuzi succeeded him under protection of the Western Wei. Another relative, Yujiulü Tiefa declared himself khagan in the east of the Gobi.

The death of Anagui effectively ended the Rouran empire which had for the previous century and a half been the dominant power on the eastern steppe.

== Family ==
He was married to Princess Lanling (蘭陵公主), daughter of Yuan Yi, Prince Qinghe Wenxian (清河文獻王 元懌; 488–520) and granddaughter of Emperor Xiaowen of Northern Wei. He had following children:

- Yujiulü Anluochen
- Empress Yujiulü (525-540) - Empress of Western Wei
- Princess Ruru (530 - 6 May 548) - Consort of Gao Huan.

== Sources ==
Preceded by Yujiulü Poluomen	Khagan of Rouran; 522–552	Succeeded by Yujiulü Dengshuzi (West)
Preceded by Yujiulü Poluomen	Khagan of Rouran; 522–552	Succeeded by Yujiulü Tiefa (East)
Preceded by Yujiulü Chounu	Khagan of Rouran; 520–521	Succeeded by Yujiulü Poluomen
