= Queen Dugu (TV series) =

- Promotional image
- Genre: Historical fiction
- Written by: Yang Ji
- Directed by: Zhang Xiaozheng
- Starring: Joe Chen; Chen Xiao
- Country of origin: China
- Original language: Mandarin
- No. of episodes: 50

Production
- Executive producer: Zhao Yifang
- Production company: Huace Media

Original release
- Network: iQiyi, Youku, Tencent
- Release: February 11, 2019

Queen Dugu (Chinese: 独孤皇后) is a 2019 Chinese web series starring Joe Chen and Chen Xiao. It is based on the life of Dugu Jialuo and her husband Yang Jian, the founder of the Sui dynasty. It started airing online via iQiyi, Youku and Tencent on February 11, 2019.

== Plot ==
After her family was accused of treason, Dugu Jialuo was determined to be brave and independent. Her husband Yang Jian was also extraordinary. He ascended to the throne during times of war and established the Sui dynasty. With the assistance of Jialuo, they created a prosperous country from scratch. As Emperor and Empress, they strengthened the economy and respected the civilians. As husband and wife, they loved and trusted each other deeply.

== Cast ==
=== Main ===
- Joe Chen as Dugu Jialuo, Empress Wenxian of Sui
  - Youngest daughter of the Dugu family. Due to her family misfortunes, Dugu Jialuo has developed a perceptive insight since young. She is intelligent and wise, and is adept at handling political matters.
- Chen Xiao as Yang Jian, Emperor Wen of Sui
  - Eldest son of Yang Zhong.

=== Supporting ===
==== Yang Family ====
- Song Yi Xing as Yang Lihua, Princess Leping of Sui
  - Crown Princess (Northern Zhou) → Empress Tianyuan (Northern Zhou) → Grand Empress Tianyuan (Northern Zhou) → Princess Leping. Dugu Jialuo and Yang Jian's daughter. Wife of Yuwen Yun.
- Zhang Lei as Yang Zhong
  - Duke of Sui. Father of Yang Jian.
- Li Zheng Yang as Yang Zheng
  - Second son of Yang family.
- Ying Zi as Yuchi Rong
  - Yuchi Jiong's daughter, wife of Yang Zheng. She harbors a grudge toward Dugu Jialuo, as the latter exposed her extramarital affair with her first love, causing her to lose her husband's favor.
- Fang Yi Lun as Yang Zan, Prince of Tai
  - Duke of Shao (Northern Zhou) → Prince of Tai. Third son of Yang family. He is adept at the arts of music.
- Liu Zhe Hui as Yang Shuang, Prince of Wei
  - Tongan Jungong (Northern Zhou) → General of Northern Zhou → Prince of Wei. Youngest son of Yang family.
- Xu Xiao Han as Chen Wanyi, Lady Xuanhua of Sui
  - Princess of Southern Chen → Palace maid → Lady Xunhua. She was taken as a consort by Yang Jian
- Tang Xiao Tian as Yang Yong, Crown Prince of Sui
  - Marquess of Boping (Northern Zhou) → Duke of Changning (Northern Zhou) → Grand Marshall (Northern Zhou) → Crown Prince. Yang Jian and Dugu Jialuo's eldest son. He was later disposed of his position, stripped of his title and became a commoner.
- Ren Wanqing as Yuan Zhen, First Crown Princess of Sui
  - Daughter of Founding Minister Yuan.
- Lu Yan as Gao Ling, Second Crown Princess of Sui
  - Daughter of Gao Jiong.
- Zhu Lingwu as Yun Ruoxia
  - Concubine of Yang Yong.
- Ma Xin Ming as Yang Guang, Emperor Yang of Sui
  - General of Northern Zhou → Prince Jin → Crown Prince → Emperor. Yang Jian and Dugu Jialuo's second son, who later become the second Emperor of Sui.
- Yang Tian Yuan as Xiao Qiang, Empress Xiao of Sui
  - Princess of Western Liang → Princess Consort Jin → Crown Princess → Empress. Wife of Yang Guang.

==== Dugu Family ====
- Qin Yan as Dugu Xin
  - Duke of Wei.
- Guo Hong as Lady Cui
  - Dugu Xin's wife.
- Xu Xiao Han as Empress Dugu
  - Eldest daughter of the Dugu family. Wife of Yuwen Yu.
- Yang Bo as Dugu Shan
  - Eldest son of the Dugu family.
- Chen Heng as Shangguan Ying'e
  - Dugu Shan's wife.

==== Yuchi Family ====
- Sun Lei as Yuchi Jiong
  - General of Northern Zhou, later Regent of Xiangchuan of Northern Zhou.
- Zhang Lin as Yuchi Kuan
  - Yuchi Jiong's son.
- Sun Mengjia as Zhao Yan
  - Yuchi Kuan's wife. Zhao Gui's daughter.
- Ying Zi as Yuchi Rong
  - Yuchi Jiong's daughter, wife of Yang Zheng.
- Gu Yu Han as Yuchi Wenji
  - Yuchi Kuan and Zhao Yan's daughter. She was a palace maid in Sui palace, and later attracted the attention of Yang Jian. She was later killed by Dugu Jialuo for seducing her husband.
- Zhang Jing as Yuchi Chifan
  - Yuchi Jiong's granddaughter. One of Yuwen Yun's five empresses.

==== Yuwen Family ====
- Jiang Kai as Yuwen Hu, Grand Preceptor of Northern Zhou
  - A vicious and merciless man who takes charge of the political affairs in court and wields great power.
- Qian Yong Chen as Yuwen Yu, Emperor Ming of Northern Zhou
- Xu Xiao Han as Empress Dugu, Empress Mingjing of Northern Zhou
  - Wife of Yuwen Yu.
- Chen Ruoxi as Yun Chan, Second Empress of Northern Zhou
  - Niece of Yuwen Hu. She was used as a political tool by Yuwen Hu to spy on Yuwen Yu.
- Qi Ji as Yuwen Yong, Emperor Wu of Northern Zhou
  - Duke of Lu → Emperor. Dugu Jialuo's first love and childhood friend; the two separated as Dugu Jialuo could not accept the idea of sharing a husband with another woman. During his captive as a "puppet ruler", he was aided by Yang Jian and Dugu Qieluo who helped him get freed. However, his suspicious nature later caused him to grow distrustful of Yang Jian.
- Hai Lu as Ashina Song, Empress Wucheng of Northern Zhou
  - Princess of Tujue → Duchess of Lu → Empress. She was married to Yuwen Yong through a political marriage between two countries. She resents Dugu Jialuo as Yuwen Yong loved her.
- Xi Zi as Yuwen Zhu, Princess Shunyang of Northern Zhou
  - Yang Zan's wife.
- Wang Xin Yu as Yuwen Yun, Emperor Xuan of Northern Zhou
  - Duke of Lu → Crown prince → Emperor. Eldest son of Yuwen Yong.
- Song Yi Xing as Yang Lihua, Grand Empress Tianyuan of Northern Zhou
  - One of Yuwen Yun's five empresses.
- Jiao Na as Zhu Manyue, Empress Tianyuan of Northern Zhou
  - One of Yuwen Yun's five empresses.
- Chen Qian as Chen Yueyi, Empress Tianzhong of Northern Zhou
  - One of Yuwen Yun's five empresses.
- Zhang Jing as Yuchi Chifan, Empress Tianzuo of Northern Zhou
  - One of Yuwen Yun's five empresses.
- Yuan Weiyi as Yuan Leshang, Empress Tianyou of Northern Zhou
  - One of Yuwen Yun's five empresses.
- Ye Kaiwen as Yuwen Xian
  - Son of Yuwen Yu and Empress Mingjing.
- Wu Hong as Yuwen Hui
  - Son of Yuwen Hu.

==== Northern country ====
- Peng Bo as Ashina Yanyu
  - Prince of Tujue. Ashina's brother.
- Ba Yuan as Tardu
- Li Chengjia as Jieji Khagan
- Peng Bo as Jieha Khagan

==== Others ====
- Zhang Lu as Gao Jiong
  - General of Northern Zhou, later Prime Minister of Sui. Childhood friend of Dugu Jialuo and Yuwen Yong.
- Yan Su as Yang Su
  - Supreme general of Northern Zhou, later Prime Minister of Sui. Close friend of Yang Jian.
- Li Duo as Gao Bin
  - Provincial governor of Northern Zhou.
- Feng Hui as Zhao Yue
  - Advisor of Northern Zhou. Yuwen Hu's subordinate.
- Feng Qian as Zhao Gui
  - General of Northern Zhou.
- Yang Mingwei as Yuwen Shu
  - General of Sui.
- Gao Ye as Zheng Qiye
  - Yang Su's wife. Close friend of Dugu Jialuo.
- Yang Sheng Yuan as Xu Zhuo
  - Ally of Dugu Xin.
- Wang Hai Long as Chen Shubao
  - Emperor of Chen dynasty.
- Yang Yu Lan as Yao Shanggong
  - Head palace maid.

== Soundtrack ==
- Rong Dui Zhuang (戎对妆) - Joey Yung
- Yi Nian San Qian (一念三千) - Zhang Lei, Liu Xijun
- Tian Gao (天高) - Yisa Yu
- Xiu Xiu (休休) - Zeng Yiming

== See also ==
- The Legend of Dugu
