= The Legend of Dugu =

- Promotional poster
- Genre: Historical fiction
- Written by: Zhang Wei
- Directed by: Hou Shu-pei; Lan Zhiwei
- Starring: Hu Bingqing; Zhang Danfeng; Ady An; Jeremy Tsui; Li Yixiao
- Country of origin: China
- Original language: Mandarin
- No. of seasons: 1
- No. of episodes: 55

Production
- Executive producers: Gao Xixi; Lü Jihong
- Running time: 45 minutes
- Production companies: Orient Star; Beijing Hope Century Motion Pictures Co., Ltd; Ledo Entertainment; Younger Culture

Original release
- Network: Tencent

The Legend of Dugu (simplified Chinese: 独孤天下; traditional Chinese: 獨孤天下; pinyin: Dúgū Tiānxià) is a 2018 Chinese television series starring Hu Bingqing, Zhang Danfeng, Ady An, Jeremy Tsui and Li Yixiao. The series chronicles the life of the Dugu sisters. It premiered on Tencent on 21 February 2018.

== Synopsis ==
During the Northern and Southern dynasties, the Dugu family was the focus of world attention to the well-known "Dugu prophecy" given to Yuwen Tai that states the true king is not yet set and the Dugu family will be the key to ruling the world. The head of the Dugu family, Dugu Xin was concerned. Two of the Dugu sisters thought they would be the ones to fulfill the prophecy.

The eldest sister Dugu Banruo is wise and ambitious. She loves the fierce general Yuwen Hu, but marries the weak Emperor Yuwen Yu to fulfill the prophecy. Banruo dies while giving birth to her son with Yuwen Yu. She previously had a daughter whom she entrusts to her sister, Dugu Jialuo. Her daughter is raised as Yang Lihua and marries Emperor Xuan. She and her daughter Lihua were both Empresses of Northern Zhou.

The second daughter Dugu Mantuo is greedy and also ambitious. She yearns to become Empress too just like her older sister because of her low status. Mantuo refuses the advances of Yang Jian and wanted to instead wed her younger sister's fiancé. Unexpectedly, she ends up marrying the father of her sister's fiancé, Li Bing. Her son with Li Bing would later become Li Yuan, the founding Emperor of the Tang dynasty. Mantuo would be honored as Empress Yuanzhen after her death.

The youngest daughter Dugu Jialuo is gentle and virtuous. She originally had feelings for Yuwen Yong, but their relationship doesn't last. She becomes the fiancée of Li Cheng, but their arrangement is broken off after Mantuo is married to Li Cheng's father. Jialuo marries Yang Jian and eventually falls in love with him. He swore to only love her, and they have several children together. Despite Jialuo's dislike for politics, they founded the Sui dynasty together. She would become Empress Dugu of Sui.

All three marry into royalty, but each have a different destiny and fate. All of them end up becoming Empresses or Empress Dowagers of three different dynasties. In the end, the Dugu prophecy didn't only mean a person, but instead meant Dugu blood would rule the world.

== Cast ==
=== Northern Zhou ===
==== Dugu family ====
- Hu Bingqing as Dugu Jialuo (Dugu Qieluo), Empress Wenxian of Sui.
  - Youngest daughter of the Dugu family. A valiant but gentle, virtuous and learned woman who wants nothing but peace. She has an unclear relationship with Yuwen Yong but later married Yang Jian due to political reasons and as her father's last wish. She eventually falls in love with him and commits her life to building a country with him even though she never wanted him to become emperor. She takes in Lihua (her sister Banruo and Yuwen Hu's daughter) as her and Yang Jian's daughter and also gives birth to two sons to Yang Jian.
- Ady An as Dugu Banruo, Empress Mingjing of Northern Zhou.
  - Eldest daughter of the Dugu family. A wise, ambitious woman who yearns for power and authority. Despite her love for Yuwen Hu, she marries Yuwen Yu in order to become the most powerful woman. However, because her husband lacks power, she ended up giving herself to Yuwen Hu to save her sister Jialuo and as a result became pregnant with their daughter, Lihua. Lihua ends up inheriting her father's one-sided blue eye so Banruo is forced to part with her daughter. She later becomes pregnant with Yuwen Yu's child, but because Geshu poisoned her during her pregnancy, they both die shortly after childbirth.
- Li Yixiao as Dugu Mantuo / Yuchi Fanye, Empress Yuanzhen of Tang.
  - Second daughter of the Dugu family. Due to her mother's status as a concubine, she is burdened by her lowly status since young and yearns for wealth and power. She refuses to marry her original fiancé, Yang Jian, and instead tried to snatch her younger sister (Jialuo)'s fiancé, Li Cheng. However, due to a miscalculation, she ended up marrying Li Cheng's father, Li Bing instead. Her first daughter with Li Bing is killed by Lady Feng's servant. She ends up having a twin boy and girl with Li Bing years later.
- Huang Wenhao as Dugu Xin
  - Minister of Northern Zhou. Head of the Dugu family.
- Tian Bo as Dugu Shun
  - State minister of Northern Zhou. Fifth son of the Dugu family.

==== Royal family ====
- Su Mao as Yuwen Tai
  - A paramount general of Western Wei. Dugu Xin and Yang Zhong's friend who is as close as a brother. Father of Yuwen Yu, Yuwen Jue and Yuwen Yong. Uncle of Yuwen Hu.
- Jeremy Tsui as Yuwen Hu, Grand Preceptor of Northern Zhou.
  - A vicious and merciless man who takes charge of the political affairs in court and wields great power. He has a romantic yet scheming relationship with Dugu Banruo, and never gets to marry her.
- Zou Tingwei as Yuwen Yu, Emperor Ming of Northern Zhou.
  - Eldest son of Yuwen Tai. Dugu Banruo's husband. He ascended the throne following his brother, Yuwen Jue's abolishment.
- Li Ruichao as Yuwen Jue, Emperor Xiaomin of Northern Zhou,
  - Founding emperor of Northern Zhou. Third son of Yuwen Tai. Was a poor emperor and was scared of Yuwen Hu. He was abolished by Yuwen Hu after his intention to kill him was exposed.
- Yang Caiying as Yuan Humo, Princess Jin'an of Northern Zhou.
  - Yuwen Jue's wife.
- Ying Haoming as Yuwen Yong, Emperor Wu of Northern Zhou.
  - Fourth son of Yuwen Tai. He has a cold and cynical personality due to his past as a hostage of Northern Qi. In order to protect his brother Yuwen Yu, he has no choice to ascend the throne following his death and succumb to Yuwen Hu's orders. He is childhood friends with Dugu Jialuo and loves her.
- Huang Xinxi as Ashina Yun, Empress Wucheng of Northern Zhou.
  - Yuwen Yong's wife. Daughter of Muqan Qaghan.
- Zhang Zixuan as Li Ezi, Empress Dowager Tianyuen.
  - Yuwen Yong's concubine. Mother of Yuwen Yun.
- Liu Shuai as Yuwen Yun, Emperor Xuan of Northern Zhou.
  - Yuwen Yong and Li E'zi's son. Crown Prince of Northern Zhou at first. Yang Lihua's husband.
- Zhu Di'er as Zhu Manyue, Empress Tianda of Northern Zhou.
  - Yuwen Yun's concubine. Mother of Yuwen Yan/Chan.
- Wang Yiwen as Yuchi Chifan, Empress Tianzuo of Northern Zhou.
  - Yuwen Yun's concubine. She initially married Yuwen Wen, Duke of Xiyang.
- Lin Jingzhe as Yuwen Yan/Chan, Emperor Jing of Northern Zhou.
  - Yuwen Yun and Zhu Manyue's son who later gives up the throne to Yang Jian.

=== Sui dynasty ===
- Marco Lo as Yang Zhong
  - Former general of Western Wei. Yang Jian's father, Dugu Xin's close confidant.
- Shangguan Tong as Lü Kutao
  - Yang Zhong's wife, Yang Jian's mother.
- Zhang Danfeng (Huang Tianqi (young)) as Yang Jian
  - Emperor Wen of Sui, Founding emperor of Sui dynasty. Dugu Jialuo's husband; a loyal man who only loves his wife. Originally Dugu Mantuo's fiancé. He ends up a prophecy at the same temple as Yuwen Tai. Except this time, his was "帝星已明，独孤天下" meaning that the ruler has appeared and the Dugu family will rule the world. That was when his thirst for power became unstoppable.
- Gao Yaoping as Yang Lihua
  - Great Empress Tianyuan of Northern Zhou, Princess Leping of Sui. Yang Jian and Dugu Jialuo's eldest daughter in name. Her birth parents are Dugu Banruo and Yuwen Hu. She loves and married Yuwen Yun. She is blessed with the teachings of Lu Zhen and inherited her parents' wits. She grows to be a wise and understanding lady worthy of high status.
- Lu Jinhao as Yang Yong
  - Prince Fangling (Crown Prince) of Sui. Yang Jian and Dugu Jialuo's eldest son and second child.
- Yang Guang
  - Yang Jian and Dugu Jialuo's third child and second son.

=== Tang dynasty ===
- Lu Xingyu as Li Bing
  - Former minister of Northern Wei. Dugu Xin's close friend. Dugu Mantuo's husband.
- Qiang Yu as Li Cheng
  - Prince Liang of Tang. Eldest son of Li Bing. Originally betrothed to Dugu Jialuo. Falls prey to Dugu Mantuo's schemes.
- Chen Kefan as Li Yuan
  - Emperor Gaozu of Tang, Founding emperor of Tang dynasty. Fourth son of Li Bing and Dugu Mantuo. He has a twin sister named Li Tong An, but she never appears in the drama.

=== Other dynasty ===
- Ma Jinghan as Yuan Xiu, Emperor Xiaowu of Northern Wei.
- Wang Zheng as Gao Zhan, Emperor Wucheng of Northern Qi.
  - Lu Zhen's lover.
- Lü Yi as Lu Zhen
  - Female prime minister of Northern Qi. Dugu Jialuo's close friend and advisor. Gao Zhan's lover.

=== Others ===
- Yu Zikuan as Yuchi Jiong
  - Yuwen Tai's nephew. General of Western Wei, later Northern Zhou.
- Shi Ning as Zhao Gui
  - Minister of Western Wei who is Dugu Xin's enemy in court.
- Ren Meixi as Princess Qinghe
  - Yuwen Hu's wife who dies.
- Zhao Yixin as Ge Shu
  - Great general of Northern Zhou. Yuwen Hu's confidant.
- Zhou Bin as Wei Chikang
  - Great general of Northern Zhou. Yuwen Yu's entourage.
- Guo Wei as Du Xiaowei
  - Commander of Jici Army. Dugu Xin's subordinate, later Dugu Jialuo's.
- Gu Yiliang as He Quan
  - Yuwen Yong's bodyguard.
- Ma Ang as Zheng Rong
  - Yang Jian's entourage who fancies Dong Qu. Dong Qu's eventual husband.
- Jiang Xinyuan as Lady Jing
  - Li Bing's concubine and mother of his second son.
- Yi Shanshan as Lady Feng
  - Li Bing's concubine and mother of his fifth daughter.
- Zhang Qian as Lady Wang
  - A royal lady-in-waiting who is sent by Dugu Banruo to help Dugu Mantuo
- Gao Xiong as Reverent
- Yao Jianming as Housekeeper of Dugu family.
- Liu Lili as Lady Ma (Ru Niang)
  - Mantuo's wet nurse who forces Mantuo to become a greater schemer than she already is. She is the one who plotted for Mantuo to steal her sister Dugu Jialuo's fiancé.
- Yuan Xiaoxu as Chun Shi
  - Dugu Banruo's maid.
- Yu Xiaowan as Qiu Ci
  - Dugu Mantuo's maid. Kind-hearted unlike her master, but is still loyal to Dugu Mantuo.
- Chun Nan as Xia Ge
  - Dugu Jialuo's maid. She was sent out of the manor after betraying Dugu Jialuo.
- Ma Fei as Dong Qu
- Li Haoyang as Chun Ye
  - Dugu Banruo's maid, who was sent to serve Dugu Jialuo for a while.

== Production ==
The series was filmed at Hengdian World Studios from August to December 2016.

== Soundtrack ==
The Legend of Dugu - Original Television Soundtrack (独孤天下电视剧原声音乐大碟)
No.	Title	Music	Length
1.	"The Legend of Dugu (独孤天下)" (Opening theme song)	Li Yugang
2.	"Bodhi verse (菩提偈)" (Ending theme song)	Liu Xijun
3.	"Dugu (独孤)" (Insert song)	Kym
4.	"Red Dust (红尘辗)" (Insert song)	Tracy (Xiaomin) Wang & Well Lee	4:03

== Awards and nominations ==
Award	Category	Nominated work	Result	Ref.
Influence of Recreational Responsibilities Awards	Web Drama of the Year		Won	
