= Empress of Northern Zhou =

The Northern Zhou dynasty of China had nine empresses consort in its history (although the first two used the alternative title of "Heavenly Princess" (天王后, Tian Wanghou), five of whom were the wives of emperors:

1. Yuan Humo (r. 557), the wife of Emperor Xiaomin.
2. Empress Dugu (r. 558), the wife of Emperor Ming.
3. Empress Ashina (r. 568–578), the wife of Emperor Wu.
4. Yang Lihua (r. 578–579), the wife of Emperor Xuan.
5. Sima Lingji (r. 579–580), the wife of Emperor Jing.

Further, Emperor Xuan, after he had become retired emperor, created four of his concubines empresses as well, in contravention to the convention of having only the emperor's wife being empress:

1. Chen Yueyi
2. Yuchi Chifan
3. Yuan Leshang
4. Zhu Manyue
