= Sima Lingji =

Last empress of Northern Zhou

Sima Lingji (Chinese: 司馬令姬) (fl.570s to 630s) was, briefly, an empress of the Xianbei-led Northern Zhou dynasty of China. Her husband was Emperor Jing, the final emperor of the dynasty.

Sima Lingji was the daughter of the Northern Zhou general Sima Xiaonan (司馬消難) the Duke of Yingyang (荥阳公); it is not known who her mother is. Sima Xiaonan was a son of Northern Qi official Sima Ziru (司马子如; 489 - 24 January 553). Sima Ziru himself was a descendant (great x 6 - grandson) of Sima Mo, the Prince of Nanyang during the Western Jin dynasty.

On 14 August 579, Emperor Jing's father, the retired emperor Emperor Xuan, took Sima Lingji to be his son Emperor Jing's wife. Sima Lingji's age at that time was not recorded in history, but Emperor Jing was six years old at the time.

Emperor Xuan died in June 580, and the official Yang Jian, the father of Emperor Xuan's wife Empress Yang Lihua, seized power as regent. The general Yuchi Jiong, suspicious of Yang's intentions, rose against Yang, and Empress Sima's father Sima Xiaonan and another general, Wang Qian (王謙), rose in support. Sima Xiaonan, then the governor of Xun Province (勛州, roughly modern Xiaogan, Hubei), also offered to submit to Chen dynasty, along with the nine provinces he controlled. Yuchi was soon defeated, however, as was Sima, and Sima fled to Chen. Yang then had Empress Sima deposed and reduced to commoner in rank.

In March 581, Yang Jian had Emperor Jing yield the throne to him, ending Northern Zhou and establishing Sui dynasty (as its Emperor Wen). He soon had Emperor Jing and the other members of Northern Zhou's imperial Yuwen clan put to death. Sima Lingji was not put to death, and, at a later unknown date, married the provincial governor Li Dan (李丹). Nothing further was recorded in history about her, other than she was still alive during the early reign of the second emperor of the succeeding Tang dynasty, Emperor Taizong of Tang (r. 626–649). As for Sima Xiaonan, he surrendered to Sui when Chen fell in February 589. As he was a sworn brother of Emperor Wen's father Yang Zhong, Emperor Wen treated him like an uncle and did not punish him further. Indeed, Emperor Wen explicitly pardoned Sima when the two met at Chang'an. Sima Xiaonan died at home shortly after.

Chinese royalty
Preceded by Yang Lihua	Empress of Northern Zhou; 579–580	Dynasty ended
Preceded by Yang Lihua	Empress of China (Northern/Western); 579–580	Succeeded by Empress Dugu of Sui dynasty
