= Empress Sima =

Empress Sima (司馬皇后) may refer to:

- Sima Maoying (393–439), empress of the Jin dynasty
- Sima Lingji (fl. 579–581), empress of the Northern Zhou dynasty
