= Li Jingxun =

Northern Zhou and Sui dynasty princess

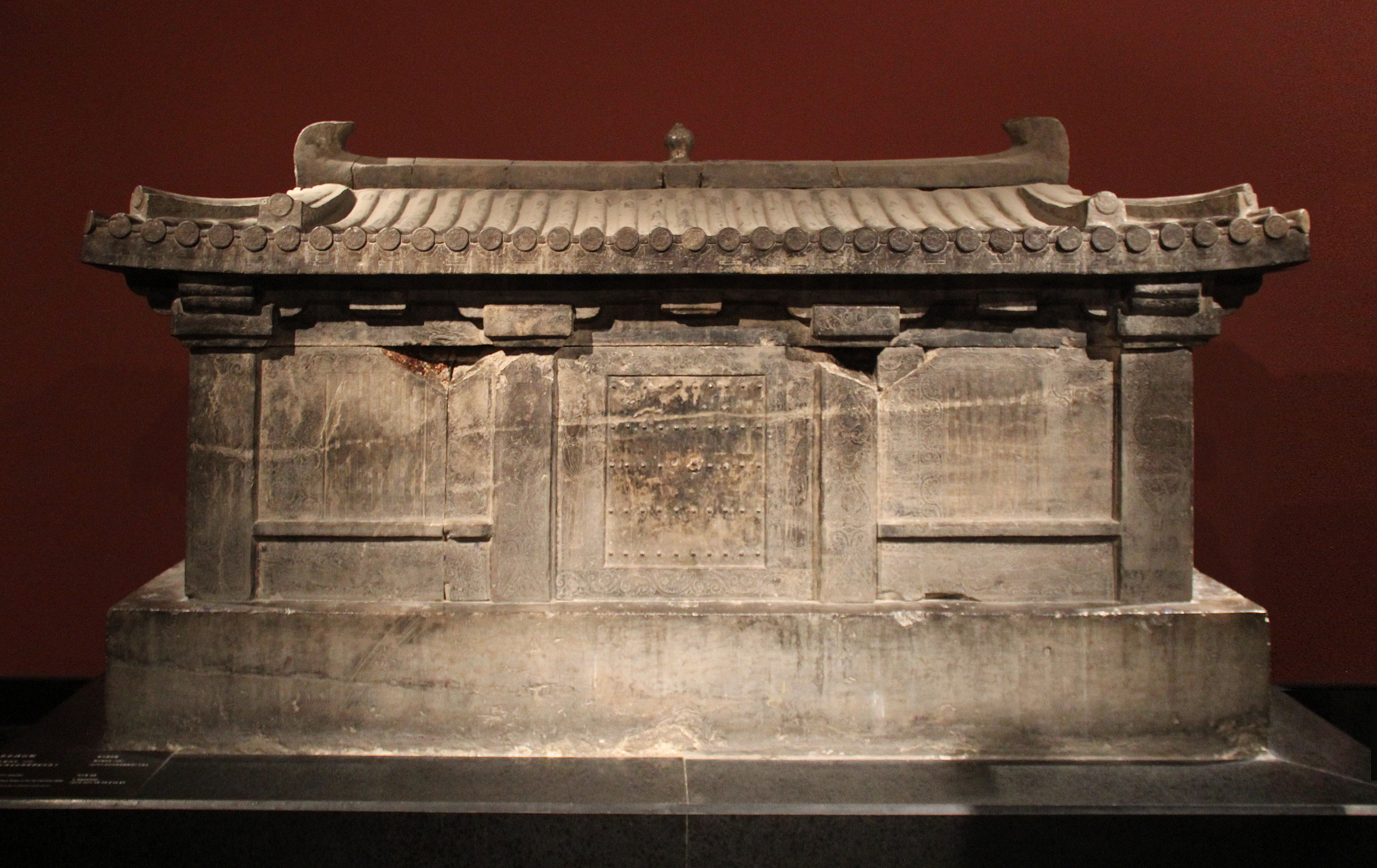
- Stone sarcophagus of Li Jingxun, 608 CE. Beilin Museum, Xi'an
- Created: 608 CE
- Discovered: Burial ground (Xi'an): 34.270047°N 108.909087°E
- Present location: Beilin Museum, Xi'an

Location

Li Jingxun (Chinese: 李靜訓, Lĭ Jìngxùn, also 李小孩, (Note: "Xiaohai" was Lady Li's courtesy name, which is an unusual case as children of her time usually did not have courtesy names.) Lĭ Xiǎohái, 600-608 CE) was a 9-year-old princess of the Sui dynasty when she died in 608 CE. Her stone sarcophagus was found undisturbed in 1957 near the Old City in Xi'an, Shaanxi Province, China, at that time named Daxing (大興, "Great Prosperity") as the capital of the Sui dynasty.

== Life ==
Li Jingxun was a granddaughter of Emperor Xuan of the Northern Zhou on her maternal side, and was raised by her maternal grandmother, Empress Xuan, herself daughter of Yang Jian who later usurped the Northern Zhou throne to become the Emperor Wen of Sui. She was born during her great-grandfather Emperor Wen's reign.

On her paternal side, she descended from a line of Northern Zhou generals. The tomb of her paternal great-grandfather, the Northern Zhou general Li Xian (北周李賢墓), has also been discovered, and the epitaph suggest that he was a Tuoba-Xianbei descendant. His tomb contained several Central Asian objects too, such as an ewer with Greco-Roman scenes.

Li Jingxun was therefore of fairly mixed ethnic lineage, since the Northern Zhou were of Xianbei origin, as was her grandmother on her maternal side, and she can be considered as an "outsider princess" in the context of the Sui dynasty.

== Tomb ==
The stone sarcophagus is in the shape of a Sui dynasty house. It is a rare design, but a carved stone coffin is also known from the tomb of another princess, Princess Yongtai (684–701). Stone outer coffins were also known among non-dynastic people, such as the Sogdian officials Wirkak and Yu Hong. The sarcophagus of Li Jingxun was decorated with two engraved male and female attendants, and with painting on the inside walls of the sarcophagus, which have disappeared due to moisture.

An inscription on a tile of the sculpted gabled roof of the sarcophagus reads: "Open this sarcophagus, and you will die immediately" (Chinese: 開棺即死).

=== Epitaph ===
The epitaph reads:

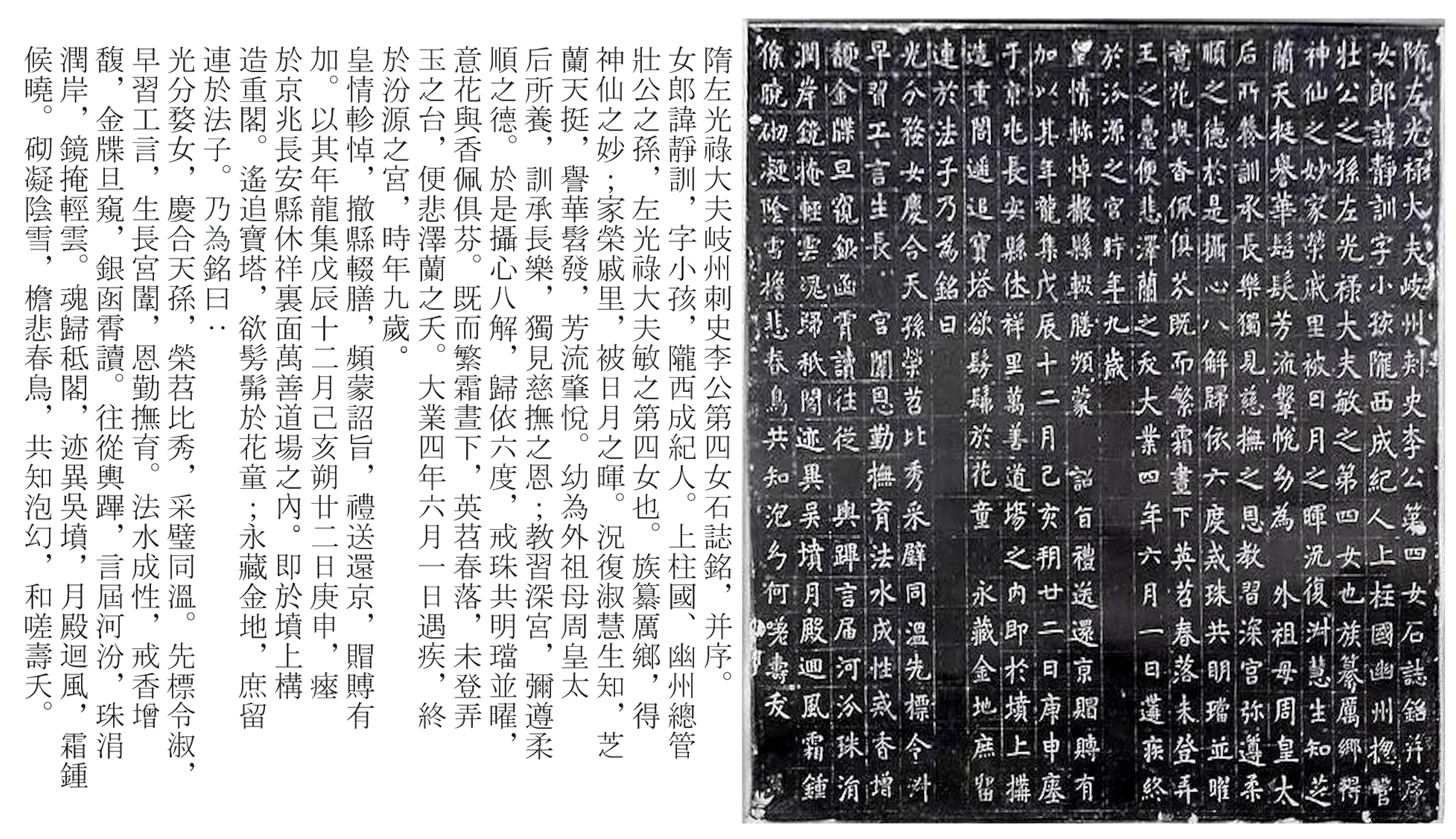
Epitaph of Li Jingxun (608 CE)

Epitaph of the 4th daughter of sir Li, Glorious Grand Master of the Left, and Prefect of Qizhou, with a prologue.
Her first name was Lingxun, also called "Little Girl" (小孩), she was from Zhenji in Longxi. She was the granddaughter of Li Zhuang, Pillar of the State and Governor of Youzhou, and the fourth daughter of Li Min, the Glorious Grand Master of the Left. Her clan, registered in Lixiang, is remarkable and immortal. Her family shines over the region, covered in the light of the sun and the moon. In addition, she was virtuous, wise and naturally intelligent, straight as an orchid, had had a great reputation since childhood, and her fragrance brought joy. She was raised by her maternal grandmother, the Empress of the Zhou, followed the rules of Everlasting Happiness, and enjoyed her warm compassion. She was educated in the depth of the Palace, and learned the virtues of pliability and obedience. Then, she focused on the Eight Liberations [of Buddhism], and converted to the Six Perfections [of Buddhism]. Her rings and earrings shined in unisson, she had the scent of flowers. But then a great frost fell on the day, the beautiful flower fell in springtime. Without ever conceiving a child, the orchid tragically died early. She became ill on the 1st of June of the 4th year of Daye (608 CE), and died in the Palace of Fenyuan. She was nine years old....
(the epitaph finishes with the account of the mourning of her death, and a formal eulogy in four-character poetic form)

— Epitaph of Li Jingxun, 608 CE

=== Tomb objects ===
Her lavish tomb contained around 350 objects, including many artifacts from the Silk Road, and foreign-style objects. The tomb included gold cups, jades, porcelains and toys, as well as a coin of the Sasanian Emperor Peroz I (459-483 CE). Still, the tomb is considered as relatively modest by imperial standards.

It is thought that the tomb artifacts reflect her northern ethnic background. Such stone sarcophagi are related to the tradition of Sogdian tombs in China, such as the tomb of Shi Jun. In comparison, other known Sui dynasty tombs have relatively few exotic items in them.

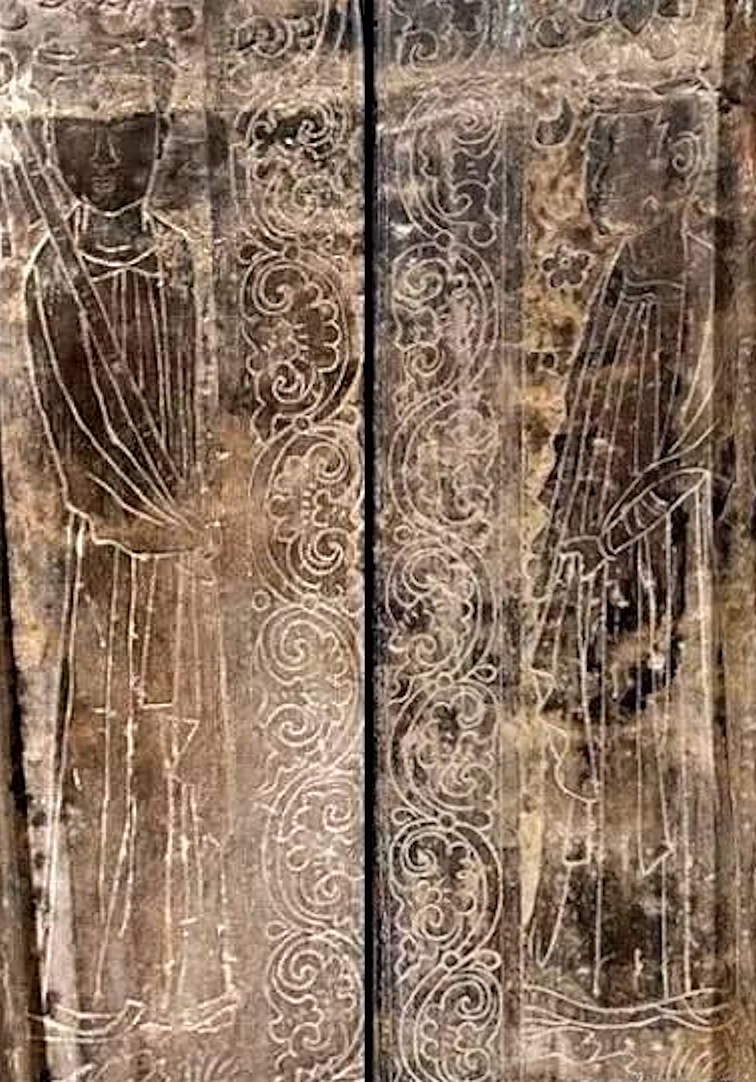
Li Jinxun tomb: engravings of female attendants left and right of the entrance

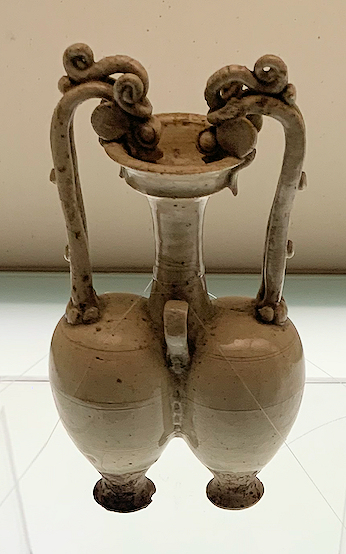
Object from the tomb of Li Jingxun, Tianjin Museum.

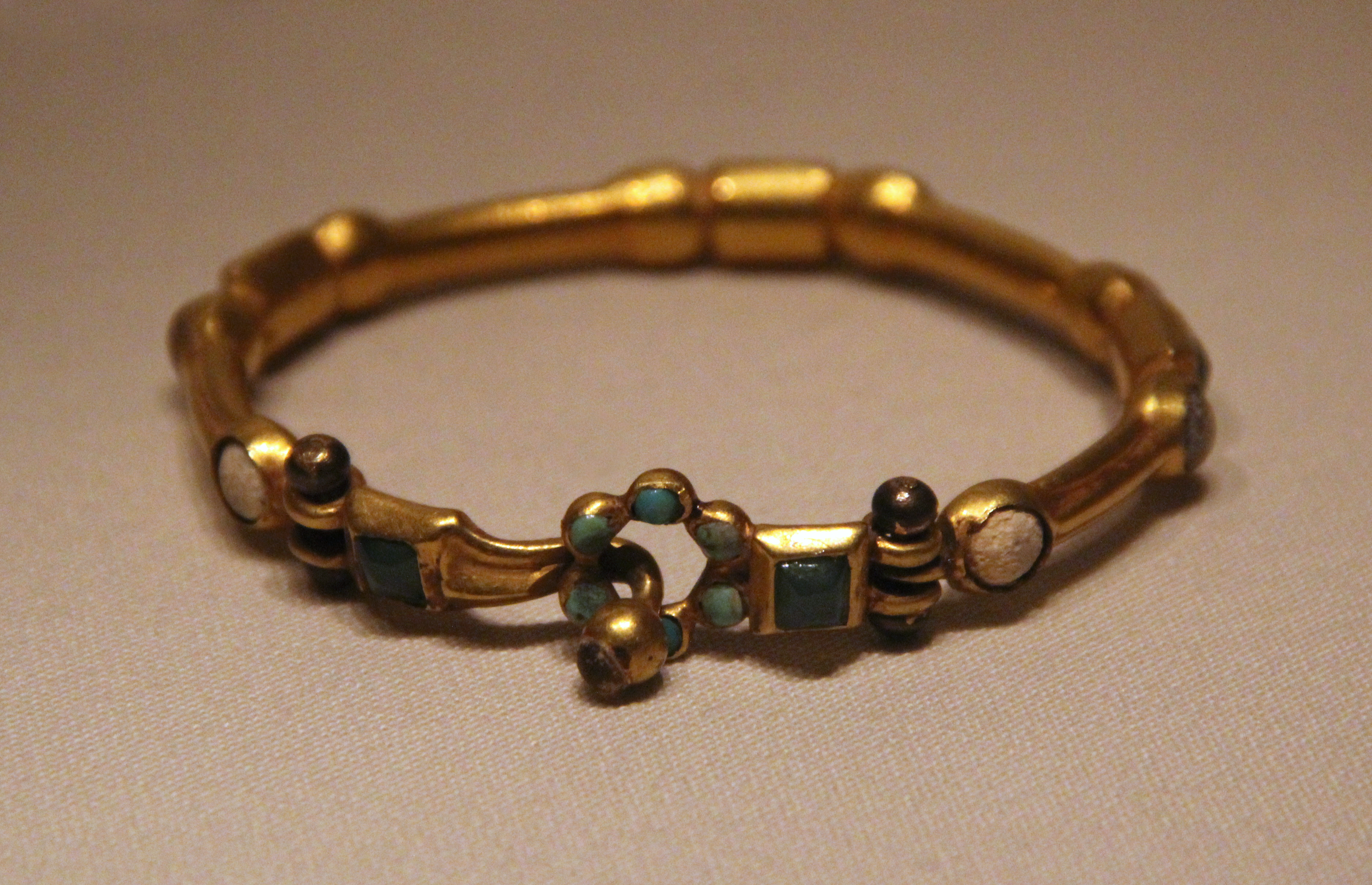
Gold bracelet from the tomb, probably imported from India. National Museum of China

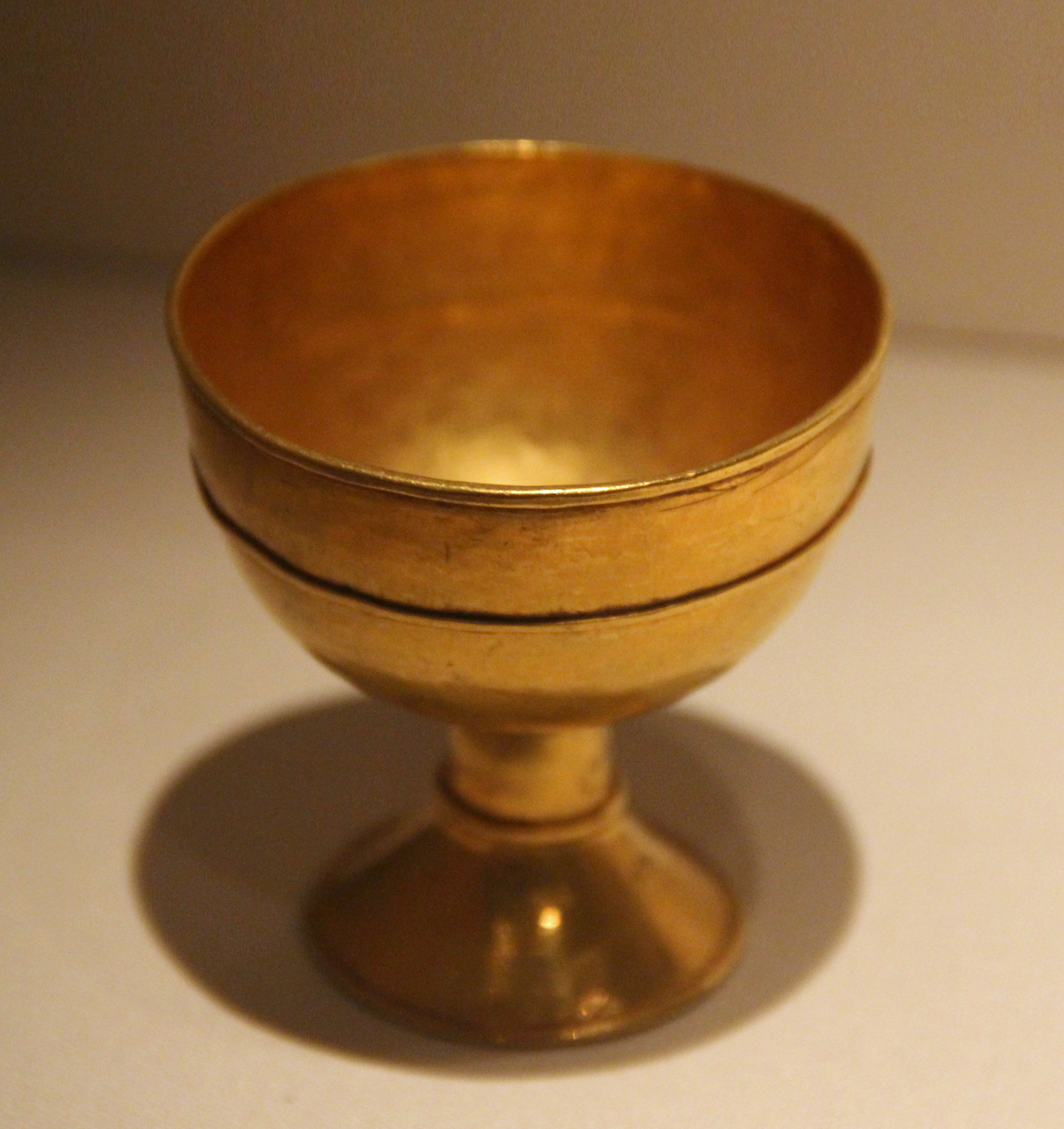
Gold stemmed cup from the tomb, National Museum of China.

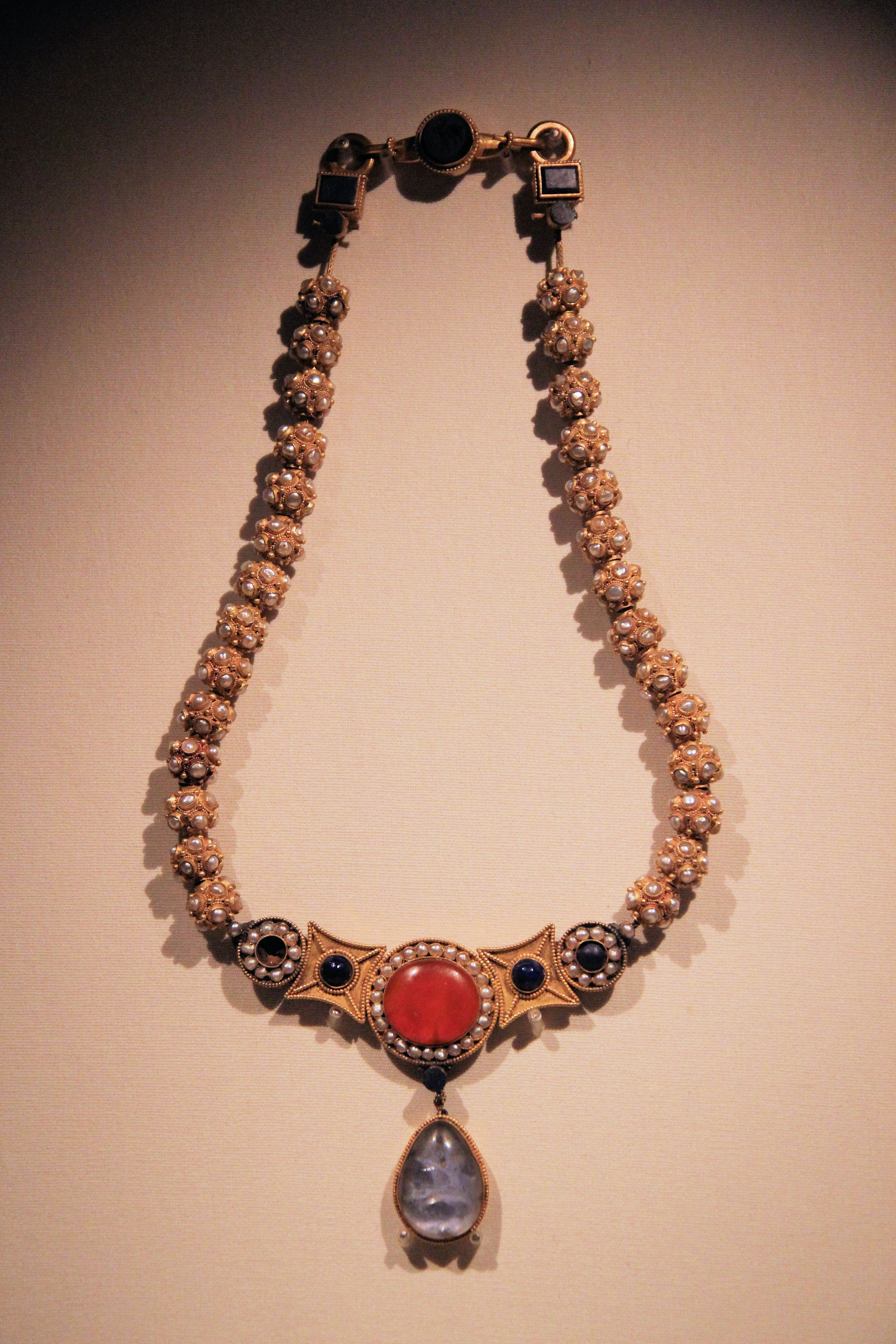
Necklace from the tomb, imported from South Asia. National Museum of China.

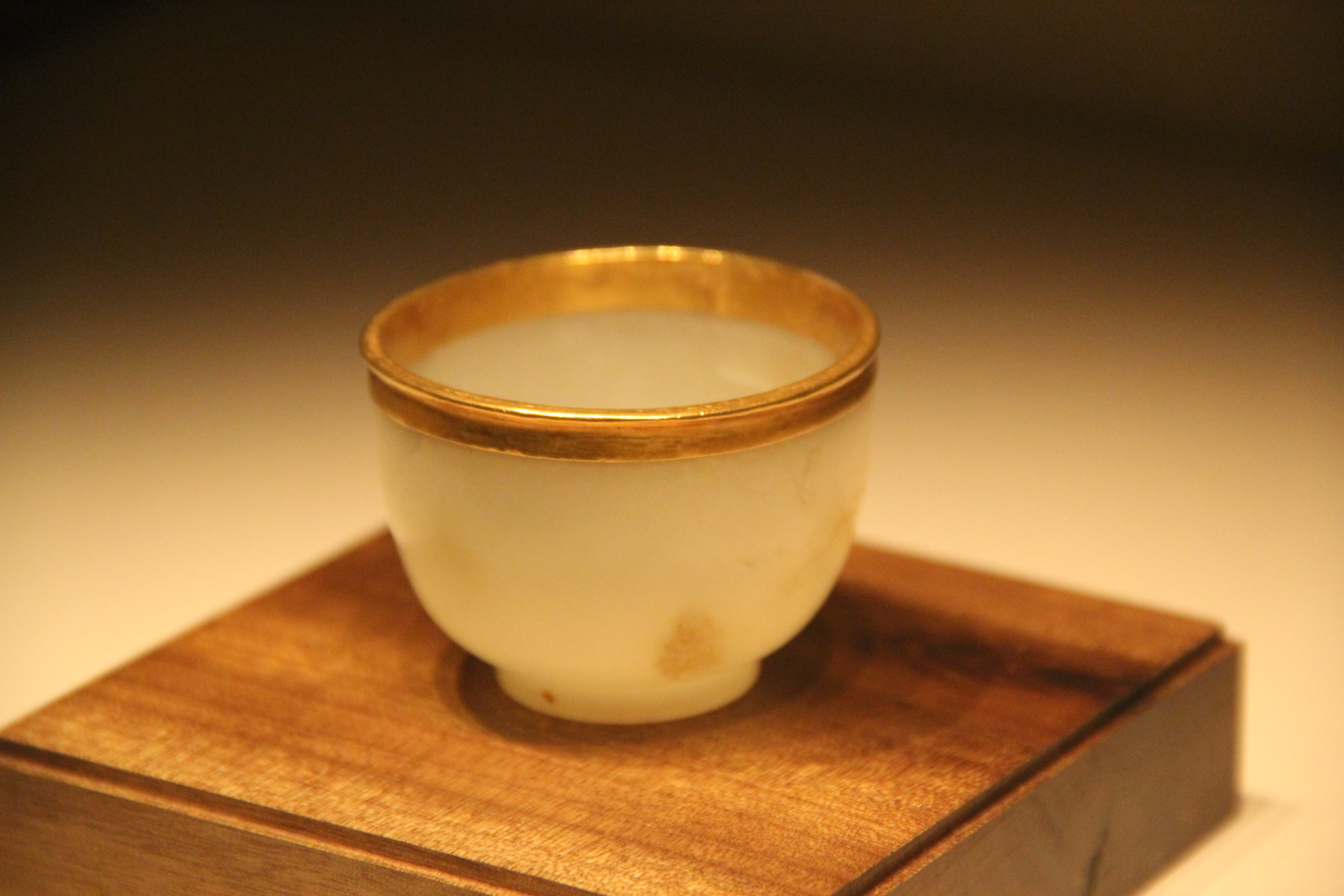
Cup with gold rim, from the tomb, National Museum of China

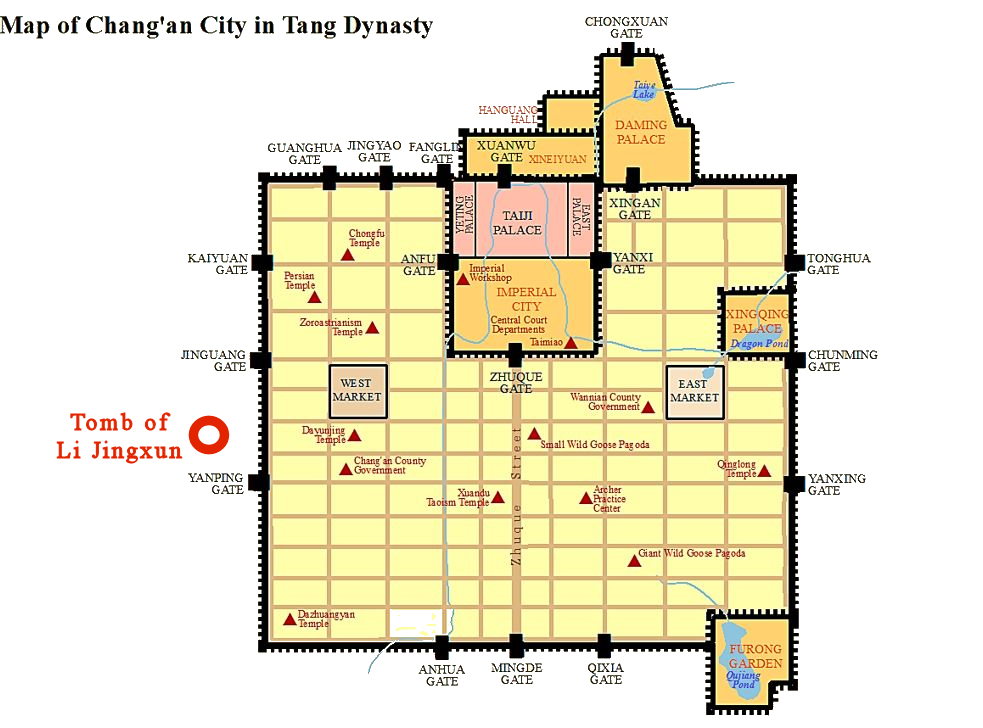
Location of the tomb of Li Jingxun, just out of the ancient city of Xi'an

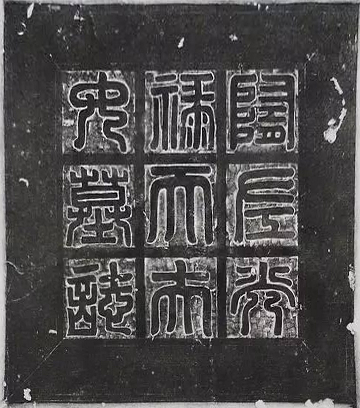
Lid of the epitaph: "隋左光禄大夫女墓志" "Epitaph by the Sui Dynasty Glorious Grand Master of the Left, for his daughter"

== Ancestry ==
Li Jingxun had an illustrious imperial and military lineage:

Li Xian (李贤, Northern Zhou general, 502-569)
Li Chen (李隆, also called 李崇, posthumously 壮, Northern Zhou general, 536-583)
Li Min (李敏, father, Sui Minister, 576-614)
Li Jingxun (李静训, 600-608)
Yuwen Tai (Xianbei General, 505–556)
Emperor Wu of Northern Zhou (543–578)
Chinu (Xianbei Princess)
Emperor Xuan of Northern Zhou (559-580)
Li Ezi (Empress Dowager Li, 535–588)
Yuwen Eying (宇文娥英, mother, 578-615)
Yang Zhong (Northern Wei General, 507–568)
Yang Jian (Emperor Wen of Sui, 541–604)
Lü Kutao
Yang Lihua (杨丽华, Empress Xuan of Northern Zhou, 561–609)
Dugu Xin (Xianbei General, 503-557)
Dugu Qieluo (Empress Wen of Sui, 544-602)
Lady Cui (崔氏, Han Chinese)
