= Chen Yueyi =

Consort of Emperor Xuan in the Northern Zhou dynasty

Chen Yueyi (Chinese: 陳月儀; fl.570 - 650), later Buddhist nun name Huaguang (華光), was a concubine of Emperor Xuan of the Northern Zhou dynasty of China.

Chen Yueyi's father was Chen Shanti (陳山提), and she was his eighth daughter. Chen Shanti was initially a servant of the Northern Wei general Erzhu Zhao, and after Erzhu's defeat by Gao Huan became a servant to Gao. He served as a general in several administrations of Northern Qi, founded by Gao's son Emperor Wenxuan of Northern Qi, eventually achieving the title of Prince of Xieyang. After Emperor Wu of Northern Zhou destroyed Northern Qi in 577, Chen Shanti became a Northern Zhou general and carried the title of Duke of Xiyang.

In c.July 579, Chen Yueyi was selected to be an imperial consort for Emperor Xuan, with the title of Defei (德妃). A month later, Emperor Xuan passed the throne to his son Emperor Jing and took an atypical title for a retired emperor, "Emperor Tianyuan" (天元皇帝, Tianyuan Huangdi). He subsequently decided that in addition to his wife Yang Lihua, he would create three more empresses, and Consort Chen was selected as one—with the title of Empress Tianzuo (天左皇后, Tianzuo Huanghou), subsequently changed in spring 580 to Tianzuo Da Huanghou (天左大皇后). Subsequently, as he wanted to create one more empress, he changed her title to Tianzhong Da Huanghou (天中大皇后) so that her Tianzuo Da Huanghou title could be given to Empress Yuchi Chifan. Among the empresses, she was said to be closest to Empress Yuan Leshang, as they entered the palace at the same time and were the same age, and they were also both favored by Emperor Xuan.

Emperor Xuan died in summer 580, and Empress Yang's father Yang Jian became regent. Empress Chen became a Buddhist nun with the name of Huaguang, and she outlived Yang Jian's subsequent Sui dynasty. According to both the Book of Zhou and History of Northern Dynasties, she and Lady Yuan were still alive during the reign of Emperor Taizong of Tang (626-649), but nothing further was recorded in either of those two official histories about her. (Note: Her Chinese Wikipedia article zh:陳月儀 indicates that she died in 650, but does not cite a source. Lady Chen's biography in Bei Shi recorded that she died in the early part of the Yonghui era (650 - 655) of the reign of Emperor Gaozong of Tang.)
