= Empress Dugu (Northern Zhou) =

Empress of the Chinese Northern Zhou dynasty

Empress Dugu or Queen Dugu (? – 14 May 558), posthumously Empress Mingjing (明敬皇后), was the wife of the Emperor Ming (Yuwen Yu) of the Xianbei-led Northern Zhou dynasty.

She was the eldest daughter of Dugu Xin, a general under Yuwen Tai, Yuwen Yu's father and paramount general of Western Wei. It is not known when she married Yuwen Yu, although historical texts imply that it was after he became the Duke of Ningdu in 548.

In 557, after Yuwen Tai's death, Yuwen Yu's cousin Yuwen Hu, the guardian of his younger di brother and Yuwen Tai's heir Yuwen Jue, forced Emperor Gong of Western Wei to yield the throne to Yuwen Jue, ending Western Wei and starting Northern Zhou.

A month later, Lady Dugu's father Dugu Xin, then the Duke of Wei, was implicated in a plot to kill Yuwen Hu with another high-level official, Zhao Gui, the Duke of Chu, even though he tried to stop Zhao. Zhao was executed, while Dugu Xin was relieved of his posts and subsequently forced to commit suicide.

Later that year, Yuwen Jue himself plotted against Yuwen Hu, and when Yuwen Hu discovered the plot, he deposed and killed Yuwen Jue and enthroned Yuwen Yu.

On 22 February 558, Yuwen Yu created Lady Dugu "Heavenly Queen". She died childless about three months later and was buried with honors due to an empress; when Yuwen Yu himself died in 560, he was buried with her.

== In popular culture ==
- Portrayed by Ady An in the 2018 series The Legend of Dugu.
- Portrayed by Xu Xiaohan in the 2019 series Queen Dugu.

Chinese royalty
Preceded by Empress Yuan Humo	Empress of Northern Zhou; 558	Succeeded by Empress Ashina
