= Empress Ashina =

Empress of Northern Zhou (551–582)

Ashina
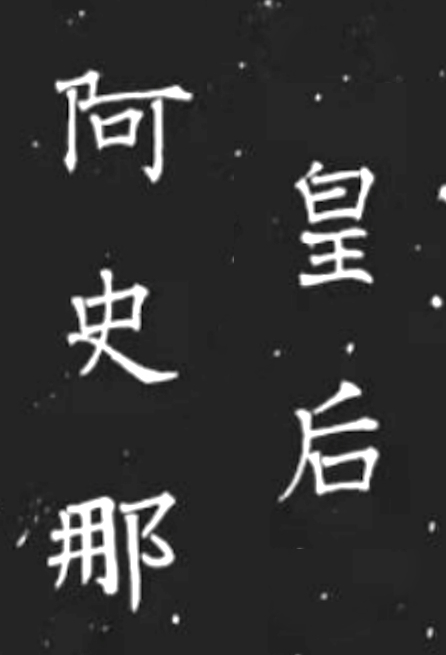
- "Empress Ashina" (皇后阿史那, Huanghou Ashina) on her epitaph

Empress consort of Northern Zhou
- Tenure: 20 April 568 – 21 June 578
- Predecessor: Empress Dugu
- Successor: Yang Lihua
- Born: 551
- Died: May 30, 582 (aged 30–31)
- Burial: 5 June, 582; Chenma (陈马), Xianyang
- Spouse: Emperor Wu of Northern Zhou
Posthumous name
- Empress Wucheng (武成皇后); Empress Wude (武德皇后, per epitaph)
- House: Ashina
- Father: Muqan Qaghan
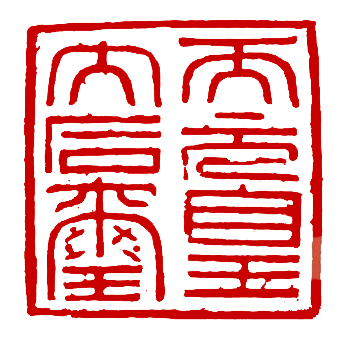
- Seal

Empress Ashina (阿史那皇后) (551 – 30 May 582) was a Göktürk princess who became an empress of the Xianbei-led Chinese Northern Zhou dynasty. She was the daughter of the Göktürk's third khagan Muqan Qaghan with a non-Turkic wife, and her husband was the Northern Zhou Emperor Wu.

== Biography ==
Ashina was born in 551 from the union of the Göktürk's third khagan Muqan Qaghan with a non-Turkic wife from a dynastic alliance.

Soon after her birth, her grandfather Tumen (Bumin Qaghan), initially a vassal of the Rouran, declared independence and established a separate Göktürk state as its Illig Qaghan. The Göktürks soon conquered most of the Rouran, taking over as the main power over the steppes to the north of the Chinese states Western Wei and Eastern Wei (and their successor states, Northern Zhou and Northern Qi respectively). Because of this, Yuwen Tai, the paramount general of the Western Wei, made repeated alliance proposals to the Göktürks, and initially, Muqan Qaghan, who took over the throne in 554 after the death of his brother, the Issik Qaghan, agreed to give a daughter to him in marriage, but soon went back on the agreement.

After Yuwen Tai's death in 556, his son Yuwen Jue seized the throne from Emperor Gong of Western Wei in the spring of 557, ending the Western Wei and establishing the Northern Zhou as its Emperor Xiaomin, and subsequently, after Emperor Xiaomin's younger brother Emperor Wu took the throne in 560, he resumed the marriage proposal with the Göktürks, and Muqan Qaghan agreed.

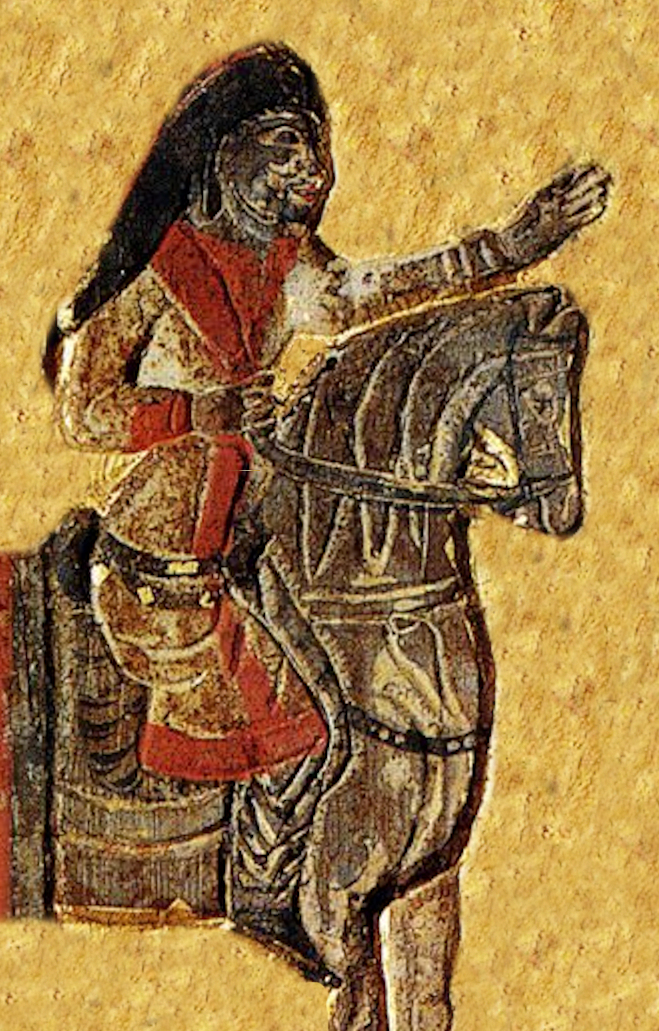
A Turkic notable, contemporary with Princess Ashina. Panel from the Tomb of An Jia, 579 CE.

In 565, Emperor Wu sent a delegation of 120 people led by his brother Yuwen Chun (宇文純), the Duke of Chen, to the Göktürks to escort Muqan Qaghan's daughter back to the Northern Zhou, but Muqan Qaghan again revoked his offer and instead considered an alliance with the Northern Qi, detaining Yuwen Chun and the rest of the delegation. In or before 568, a major storm inflicted damage on Muqan Qaghan's royal tent, and Muqan Qaghan took this as a sign of divine disapproval of his revocation of the marriage offer, and so permitted Yuwen Chun to escort his daughter to the Northern Zhou. In 568, when she arrived at the Northern Zhou capital Chang'an, Emperor Wu personally welcomed her and made her his empress.

Empress Ashina was said to be beautiful and appropriate in her actions, and Emperor Wu honored her but was said to not favor her, until his niece Lady Dou (the daughter of his elder sister the Princess Xiangyang and the official Dou Yi (竇毅), the Duke of Shenwu) reminded him of Göktürks' power and that he still had to face the rival Northern Qi and Chen dynasty, and that he needed to show the Empress greater favor to appease her home state. He agreed; However, they had no children together.

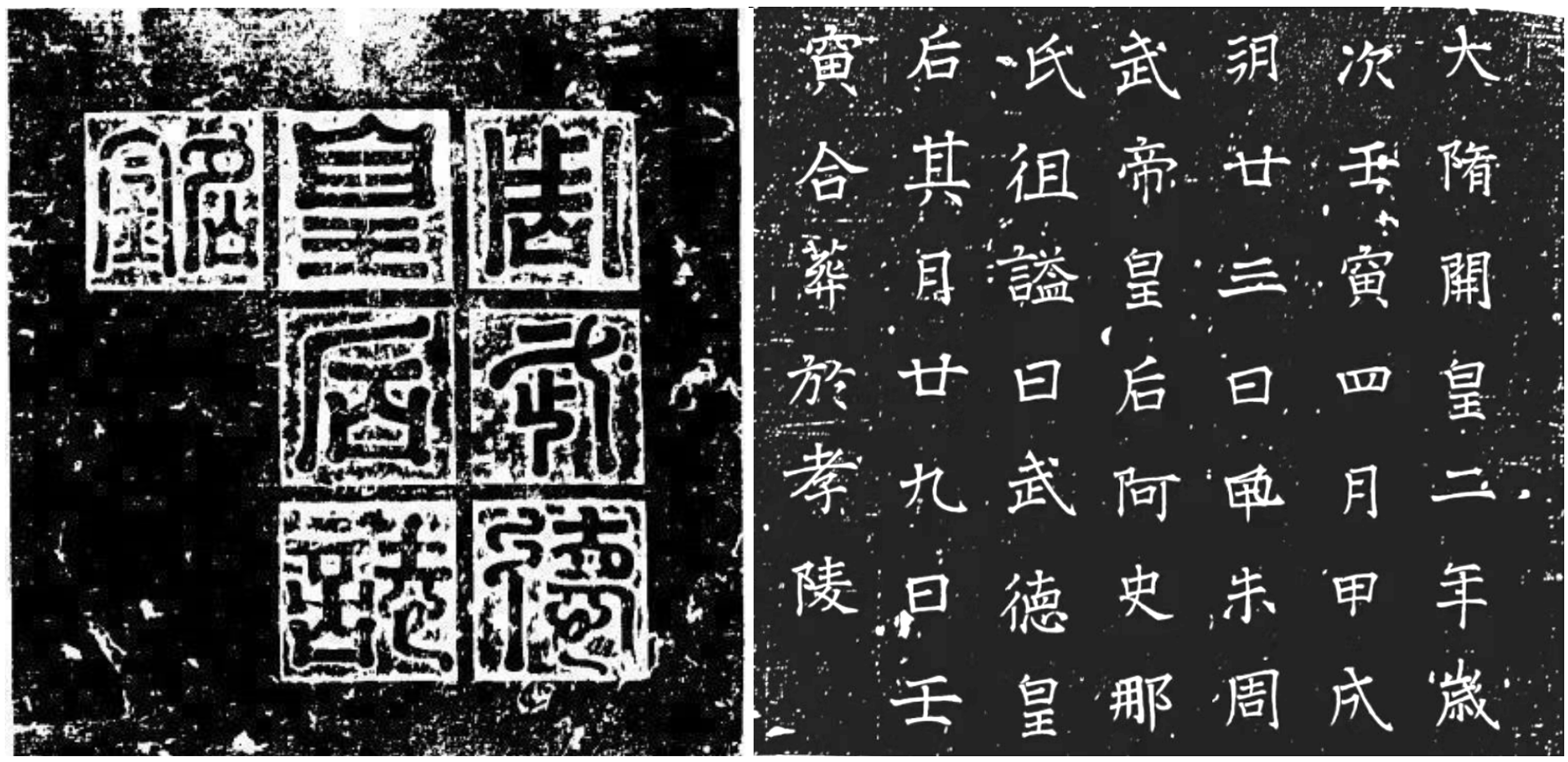
Epitaph of Empress Ashina. Front: "Inscription of Empress Wude of Zhou Dynasty" "周武德皇后志铭"). Back: "In the 2nd year of the Kai'huang era of the reign of Emperor Wen of Sui, on the 23rd day of the 4th month (corresponding to 30 May 582 in the Julian calendar), Lady Ashina, Empress Wudi of Zhou, posthumously Empress Wude, passed away and on the 29th of the same month received a joint burial in Xiaoling Mausoleum ".

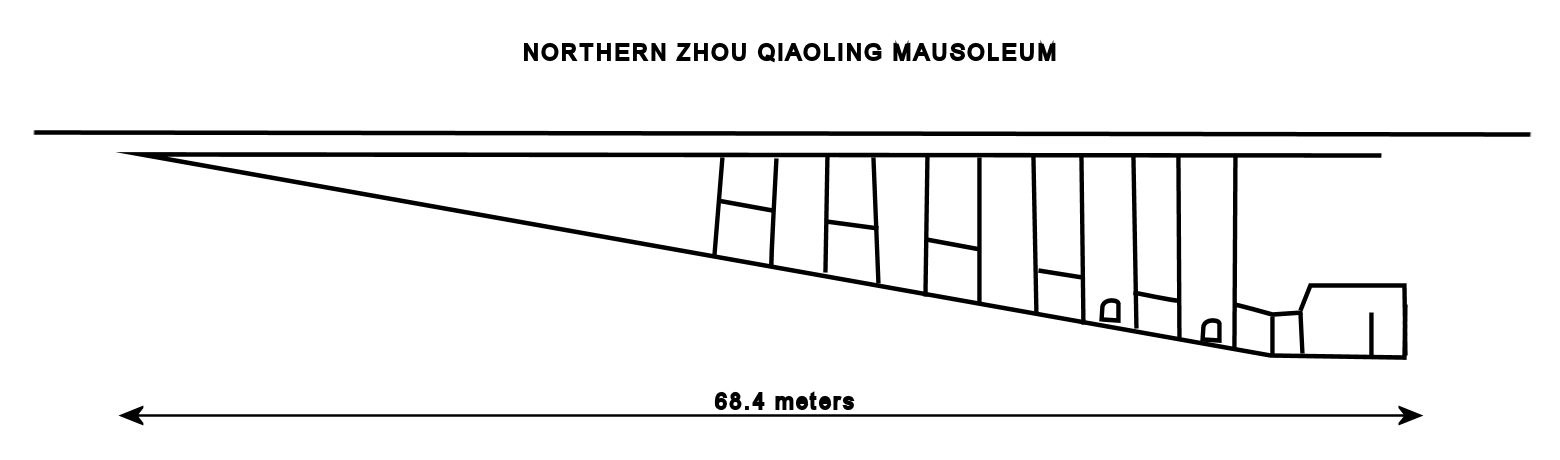
Side plan of the Northern Zhou Xiaoling Mausoleum, where Emperor Wu was buried with Empress Ashina

In 578, Emperor Wu died, and his son Yuwen Yun (by Consort Li Ezi) took the throne as Emperor Xuan. He honored both Empress Ashina and his mother Consort Li as empress dowagers. In 579, after only one year, Emperor Xuan passed the throne to his son Emperor Jing and took for himself the atypical title Tianyuan Shanghuang (天元上皇, a variation of Taishang Huang (retired emperor)), also honoring Ashina as "Empress Dowager Tianyuan" (天元皇太后 (Tianyuan Huang Taihou), later 天元上皇太后 (Tianyuan Shang Huang Taihou)).

Ashina survived the Northern Zhou's usurpation by Emperor Xuan's father-in-law Yang Jian in March 581, who established the Sui dynasty as Emperor Wen). While Yang Jian killed most of the Northern Zhou's imperial house, Ashina was not harmed. She died on 30 May 582 and was buried with honors due an empress next to her husband Emperor Wu on 5 June 582.

== Tomb ==
Her tomb was found in 1993 in Chenma village, Xianyang. She was buried there with Emperor Wu, in a large subterranean slanting structure 68.4 m (224 ft) in length, typical of imperial tombs of the period, but without a burial mound at Emperor Wu's request. The tomb was raided numerous times by looters, but several artifacts, including her golden seal and several Xianbei-style statuettes, were recovered by Shenyang police. Her golden seal is the earliest known seal, made in 579–580 with inscription "Empress Dowager Tianyuan" (天元皇太后) in large seal script. The golden seal is now in the Xianyang Museum (咸阳博物院).

An epitaph in the name of Princess Ashina was also recovered, as well as the epitaph of her husband Emperor Wu.

== Genetics ==
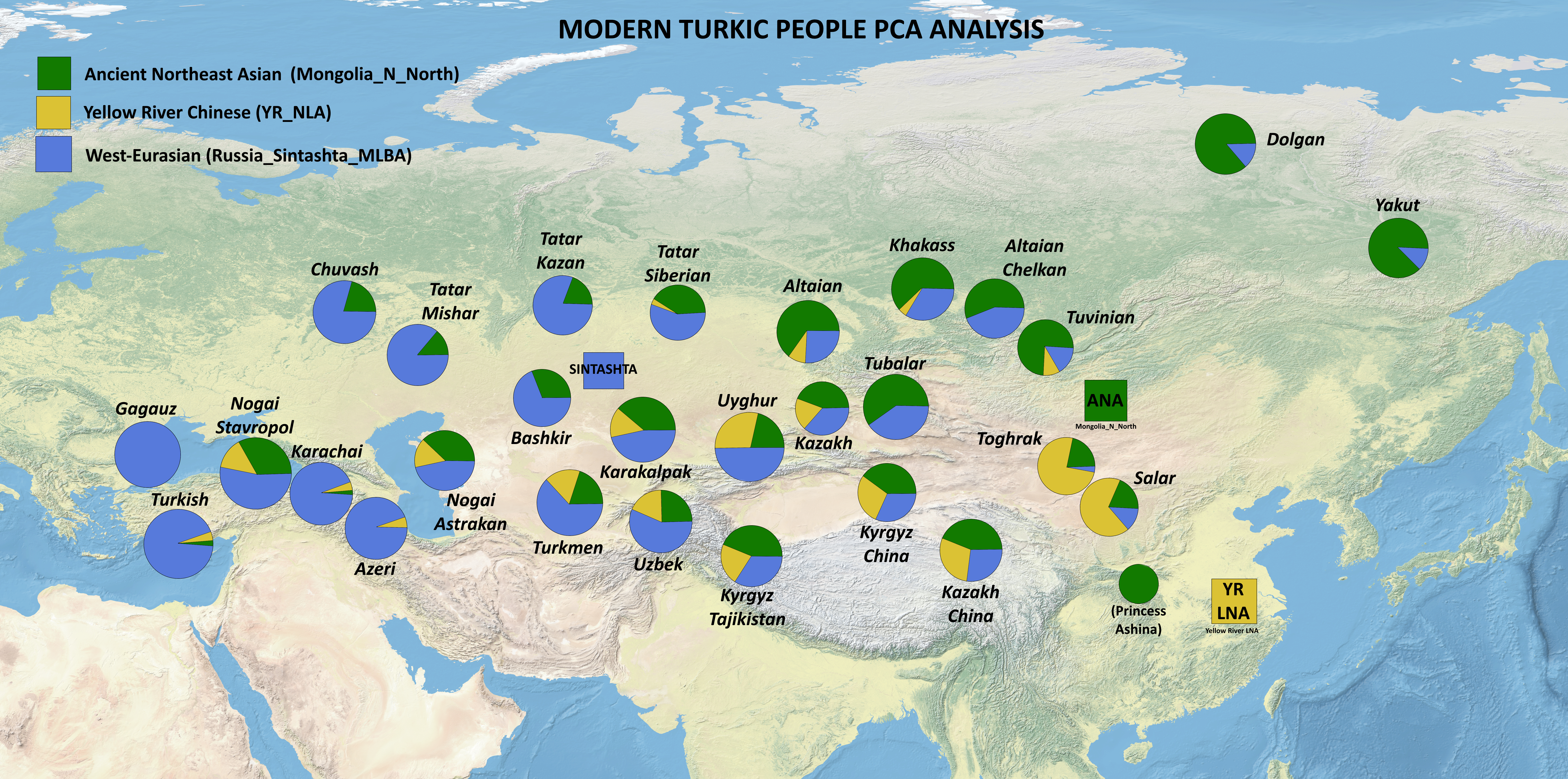
Ancestral composition of modern Turkic‐speaking populations based on supervised admixture, with modeled proportions of Ancient Northeast Asian ancestry (Mongolia_N_North and Ashina, ), as well as Chinese Central Plain millet farmers (YR_LN, ) and West Eurasian‐related ancestry (Russia_Sintashta_MLBA, ).

The first genetic analysis on the Empress Ashina in 2023 by Xiaoming Yang et al. found nearly exclusively Ancient Northeast Asian ancestry (97.7%) next to minor West-Eurasian components (2.3%), and no Chinese ("Yellow River") admixture. The small West-Eurasian component corresponded to a single admixture event (possibly Afanasievo-related) dating to around 1566 ± 396 years before Ashina's lifetime (ie dating to c. 1000 BC). Ashina's genetic profile supports the thesis of an almost exclusive Northeast Asian origin for the Ashina tribe and the Göktürk Khanate. Ashina was found to be genetically closer to East Asians than modern Central Asian Turkic groups. East Asian Turkic groups such as Dolgan, Salar, Tuvinian, Yakut, Chuvash Altaian, Altaian-Chelkan, Khakass, Kazakh-China, Kyrgyz-China showed close genetic affinity with Ashina.

The ancient Türkic royal family of the Göktürk Khaganate was found to share genetic affinities with post-Iron Age Tungusic and Mongolic pastoralists, while having heterogeneous relationships with various later Turkic-speaking groups, suggesting genetic heterogeneity and multiple sources of origin for the later populations of the Turkic Empire. According to the authors, these findings "once again validates a cultural diffusion model over a demic diffusion model for the spread of Turkic languages" and refutes "western Eurasian origin and multiple origin hypotheses" in favor of an East Asian origin for the Türks.

Modern day Turkic populations display a high level of genetic heterogeneity, with high proportions of Ashina-related Ancient Northeast Asian ancestry in the East, decreasing westward almost longitudinally to be overtaken by West Eurasian ancestry.

== Notes ==
Chinese royalty
Preceded by Empress Dugu	Empress of Northern Zhou; 568–578	Succeeded by Yang Lihua
Preceded by Empress Dugu	Empress of China (Western); 568–578	Succeeded by Yang Lihua
Preceded by Empress Mu of Northern Qi	Empress of China (Northern/Central); 577–578	Succeeded by Yang Lihua
