= Li Ezi =

- Born: 535
- Died: 588 (aged 52–53)
- Spouse: Yuwen Yong, Emperor Wu
- Issue: Yuwen Yun, Emperor Xuan
Names
- Family name: Li; Given name: Ezi Titles Empress Dowager; Empress Dowager Tianyuan (天元帝太后); Empress Dowager Tianhuang (天皇太后); Empress Dowager Tianyuan Sheng (天元聖皇太后); Grand Empress Dowager (太帝太后)

Li Ezi (Chinese: 李娥姿; 536–588), later Buddhist nun name Changbei (常悲), was an empress dowager of the Xianbei-led Chinese Northern Zhou dynasty. She was the mother of Emperor Xuan.

== Background ==
Li Ezi was born in 536, around the Jiangling region, then ruled by Liang dynasty. In 554, Northern Zhou's predecessor state Western Wei's general Yu Jin launched a major attack on Jiangling, then the capital of Liang's Emperor Yuan, capturing it and killing Emperor Yuan. While Western Wei then declared Emperor Yuan's nephew Xiao Cha Liang's emperor (as Emperor Xuan), to be a vassal of Western Wei, when Yu withdrew, he captured most of the population of Jiangling and the surrounding region back to the Western Wei capital Chang'an as spoils of war. Western Wei's paramount general Yuwen Tai awarded Li Ezi to his son Yuwen Yong, then the Duke of Fucheng, to be Yuwen Yong's concubine. She was seven years older than Yuwen Yong.

== Empress dowager ==
After Yuwen Tai's death in November 556, his son Yuwen Jue took the throne from Emperor Gong of Western Wei in 557, ending Western Wei and establishing Northern Zhou as its Emperor Xiaomin. As the emperor's brother, Yuwen Yong continued to carry the title of duke, although he was promoted to the Duke of Lu by another brother, Emperor Ming, who succeeded Emperor Xiaomin after the powerful regent Yuwen Hu deposed and killed Emperor Xiaomin later in 557. In 559, Lady Li gave birth to Yuwen Yong's oldest son Yuwen Yun. (She would later bear him another son, his second son Yuwen Zan (宇文贊), although the date of Yuwen Zan's birth is not known to history.)

In 560, Emperor Ming was poisoned by Yuwen Hu, and Yuwen Yong became emperor (as Emperor Wu). He created Yuwen Yun the Duke of Lu. He did not create Consort Li empress, and immediately began overtures to pursue formal marital relations with Tujue, commencing in marrying the daughter of Tujue's Muqan Qaghan, in 568 as his empress. However, Empress Ashina did not bear a son, and in 572, after Emperor Wu killed Yuwen Hu and personally took power, he created Yuwen Yun crown prince. In summer 578, Emperor Wu died, and Yuwen Yun became emperor (as Emperor Xuan). He honored both Empress Ashina and Consort Li as empress dowagers (with Consort Li carrying the secondary title of Di Taihou (帝太后), to distinguish her from Empress Ashina's greater title of Huang Taihou (皇太后)).

== As grand empress dowager and after the fall of Northern Zhou ==
In spring 579, the erratic Emperor Xuan formally passed the throne to his young son Yuwen Chan (as Emperor Jing), and he took an atypical title for a retired emperor — "Emperor Tianyuan" (天元皇帝, Tianyuan Huangdi). He thereafter changed her title several times — to Tianyuan Di Taihou (天元帝太后) in spring 579, then Tian Huang Taihou in summer 579, and Tianyuan Sheng Huang Taihou in spring 580. In June 580, Emperor Xuan died, and Emperor Jing, then under the control of the regent Yang Jian, honored both Empress Dowager Ashina and her as grand empress dowagers — but with the title Tai Di Taihou (太帝太后) to distinguish her from the greater title of Tai Huang Taihou (太皇太后) that Empress Dowager Ashina carried.

In March 581, Yang Jian seized the throne from Emperor Jing, ending Northern Zhou and established the Sui dynasty (as its Emperor Wen). Emperor Jing and other members of Northern Zhou's imperial Yuwen clan were soon killed. In March or April 581, Grand Empress Dowager Li became a Buddhist nun, and changed her name to Changbei (literally meaning "frequent sorrow"). She died in 588, and was buried only with ceremony due a Buddhist nun, south of Chang'an.
