= Yuan Leshang =

Concubine and Buddhist nun in Northern Zhou dynasty

Yuan Leshang (Chinese: 元樂尚; fl.570 - 630), later Buddhist nun name Huasheng (華勝), was a concubine of the Emperor Xuan of the Northern Zhou dynasty of China.

Yuan Leshang's father was Yuan Sheng (元晟), a Northern Zhou official and a descendant of the Northern Wei's imperial Yuan clan. In 579, Yuan Leshang was selected to be an imperial consort for Emperor Xuan, with the title of Guifei (貴妃). A month later, Emperor Xuan passed the throne to his son Emperor Jing and took an atypical title for a retired emperor, "Emperor Tianyuan" (天元皇帝, Tianyuan Huangdi). He subsequently decided that in addition to his wife Empress Yang Lihua, he would create three more empresses, and Consort Yuan was selected as one—with the title of Empress Tianyou (天右皇后, Tianyou Huanghou)— on 30 August 579, subsequently changed on 28 March 580 to Tianyou Da Huanghou (天右大皇后). Among the empresses, she was said to be closest to Chen Yueyi, as they entered the palace at the same time and were the same age, and they were also both favored by Emperor Xuan.

Emperor Xuan died in June 580, and Empress Yang's father Yang Jian became regent. Empress Yuan became a Buddhist nun with the name of Huasheng, and she outlived Yang Jian's subsequent Sui dynasty. According to both the Book of Zhou and History of Northern Dynasties, she and Lady Chen were still alive during the reign of Emperor Taizong of Tang (626-649), but nothing further was recorded in either of those two official histories about her.
