= Yang Lihua =

Daughter of Emperor Wen of Sui (died 609)

- Princess Leping (樂平公主; 586–609); Grand Empress Tianyuan (天元大皇后; 578–579)
- Born: 561
- Died: 609 (aged 47–48)
- Spouse: Emperor Xuan of Northern Zhou
- Issue: Yuwen Eying, Duchess of Guangzong
- Father: Emperor Wen of Sui
- Mother: Empress Dugu

Yang Lihua (Chinese: 楊麗華; 561–609) was an empress of the Xianbei-led Chinese Northern Zhou dynasty, and later a princess of the Sui dynasty.

== Background ==
Yang Lihua was born in 561, as the eldest daughter of Yang Jian, then the heir apparent to Yang Zhong (楊忠) the Duke of Sui, and Yang Jian's wife Dugu Qieluo. In 568, her grandfather Yang Zhong died, and her father Yang Jian inherited the title of Duke of Sui.

On 30 October 573, Emperor Wu of Northern Zhou arranged Yang Lihua to be the wife of Yuwen Yun, then his crown prince, and she thereafter carried the title of crown princess. He was 14 and she was 12. They had one daughter, Yuwen Eying (宇文娥英), although her birth year is not clear.

== As Empress of the Northern Zhou ==
After Emperor Wu died in June 578, Yuwen Yun took the throne as Emperor Xuan. He created Yang Lihua empress on 29 July of that same year. However, Emperor Xuan was excessive and erratic in his behavior, and less than a year after taking the throne, in spring 579, he formally passed the throne to his son Yuwen Chan (as Emperor Jing), born of his concubine Zhu Manyue. He took an atypical title for a retired emperor, "Emperor Tianyuan" (天元皇帝, Tianyuan Huangdi). She thereafter took the title of "Empress Tianyuan" (天元皇后, Tianyuan Huanghou). However, as part of his unusual behavior, he soon decided that he would have four empresses, so he gave to three of his concubines — Consort Zhu, Consort Chen, and Consort Yuan — empress titles as well, but different from Empress Yang's to distinguish them (Empress Zhu was Tianyuan Dihou (天元帝后); Empress Chen was Tianzhuo Huanghou (天左皇后); and Empress Yuan was Tianyou Huanghou (天右皇后)). He later added one more empress, Yuchi Chifan. However, Empress Yang continued to be recognized as the most honored among his empresses. In spring 580, he added Da (大, "grand") to the empresses' titles, and therefore Empress Yang's title was changed to "Grand Empress Tianyuan" (天元大皇后).

It was said that Empress Yang was not jealous, and that she was loved and respected by the other empresses and imperial consorts. As Emperor Xuan grew increasingly erratic and violent, on one occasion, he got angry at Empress Yang and wanted to punish her. When he summoned her, however, she was relaxed but firm in her defense of herself, which angered him more, and he ordered her to commit suicide. When her mother, the Duchess of Sui heard of this, she rushed to the palace and prostrated herself, begging Emperor Xuan for mercy. His anger dissipated, and he pardoned Empress Yang.

Emperor Xuan fell suddenly ill in June 580, and Yang Jian entered the palace to attend to him. Emperor Xuan died without being able to leave instructions, and his close associate Zheng Yi (鄭譯), a friend of Yang Jian's, issued an edict in Emperor Xuan's name appointing Yang Jian as regent. Empress Yang and Empress Zhu were honored as dowager empresses. She was initially happy to hear that her father had become regent, but became apprehensive and displeased at her father when she sensed that he had designs on the throne, although she made no overt attempts to stop him. After defeating the generals Yuchi Jiong (Empress Yuchi's grandfather) and Sima Xiaonan (司馬消難) after they had risen against him in 580, Yang Jian seized the throne from Emperor Jing in March 581, ending the Northern Zhou and establishing the Sui dynasty as Emperor Wen. Emperor Wen created Emperor Jing the Duke of Jie, and while it is unclear what Empress Dowager Yang's title was at this point, it was likely she carried the title of "Dowager Duchess of Jie". Emperor Wen soon slaughtered Emperor Jing and the other members of the Northern Zhou's imperial Yuwen clan.

== As Princess Leping of Sui ==
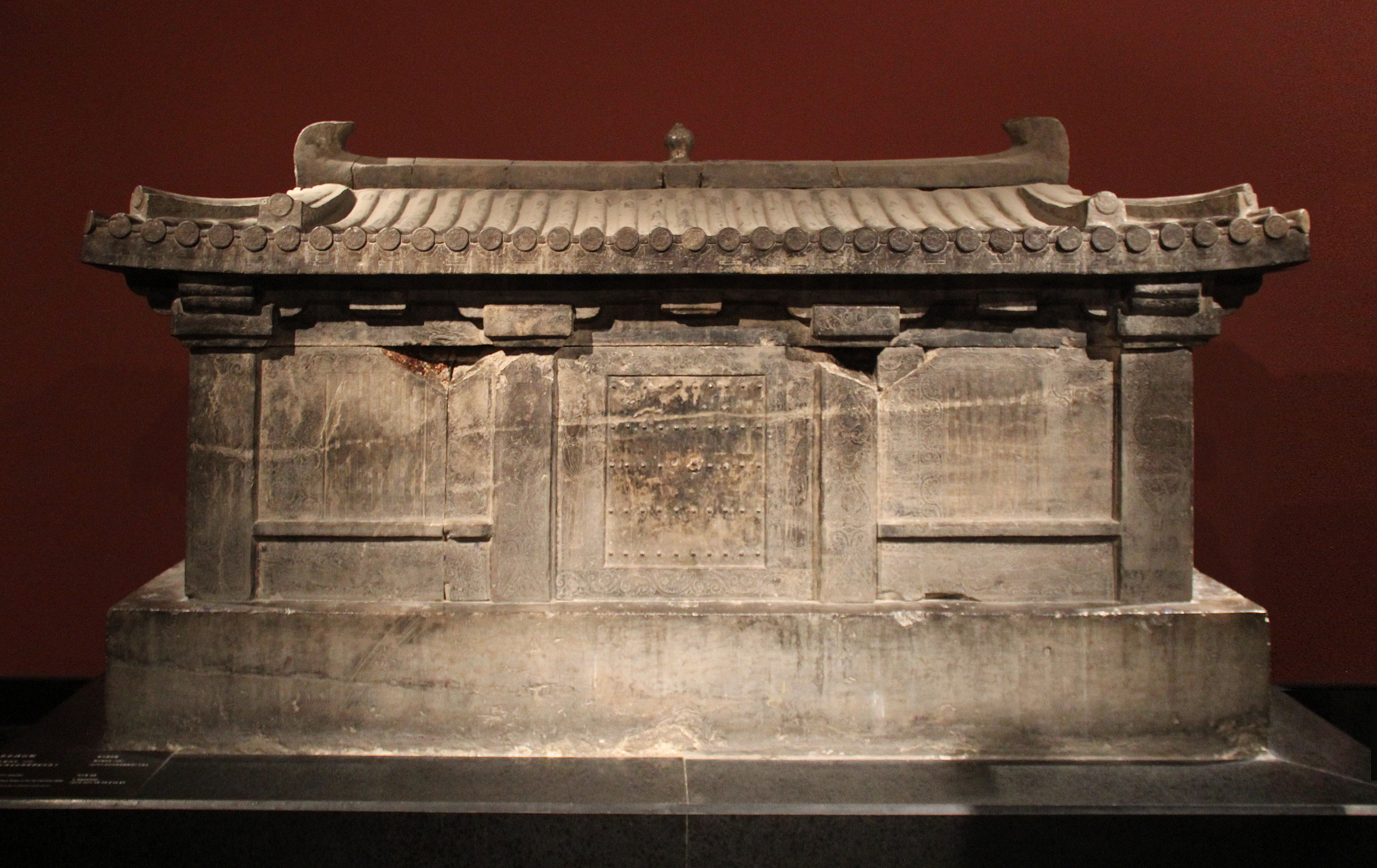
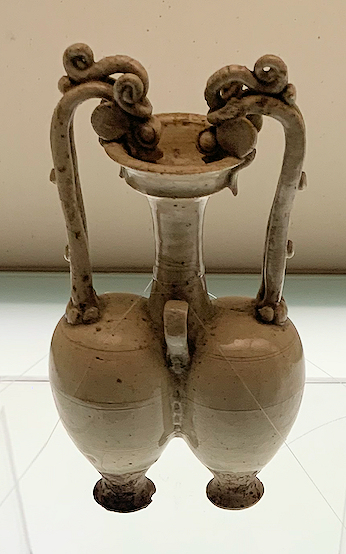
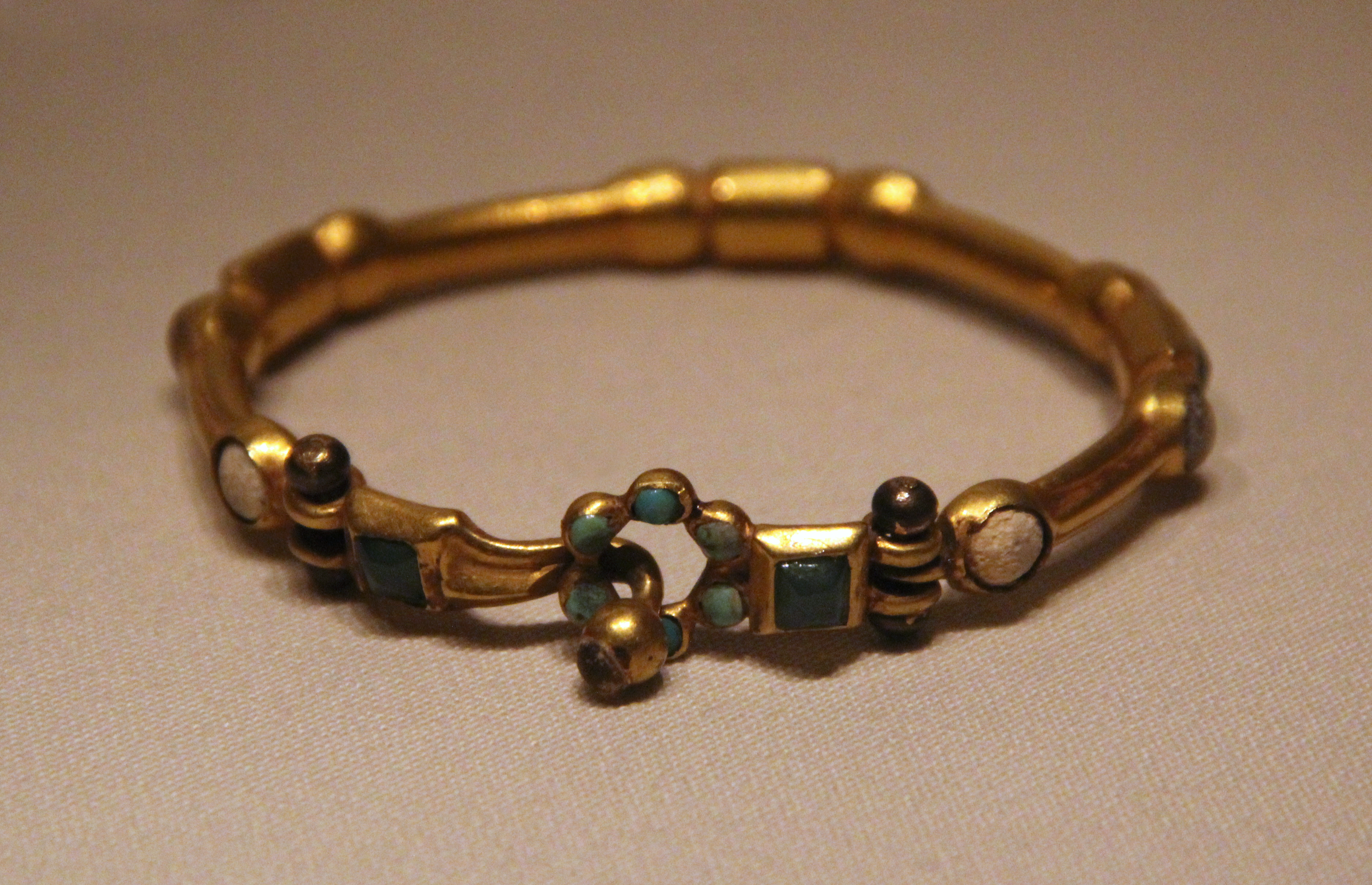
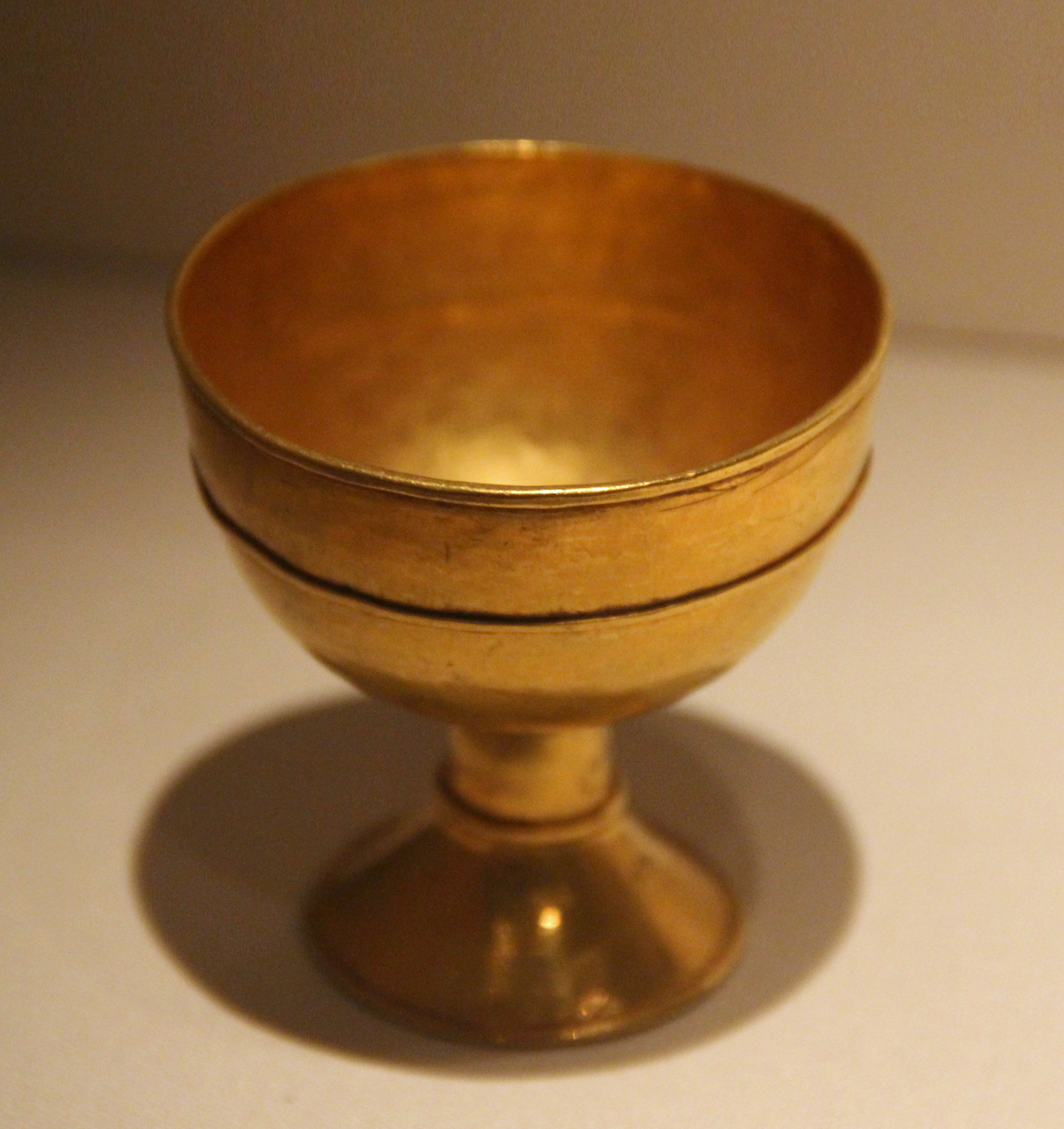
Yang Lihua commissioned the stone sarcophagus of her granddaughter Li Jingxun in 608 CE. Beilin Museum, Xi'an

In 586, Emperor Wen changed the former Empress Yang's title to Princess Leping. She was, however, still resentful of her father's usurpation, and often expressed her anger and grief. He tried to get her to remarry many times, but she refused. She instead sought a proper husband for her own daughter and eventually selected the young Li Min (李敏), Duke of Guangzong. He was raised in the palace alongside Yuwen Eying on account of his father, general Li Chong (李崇), who died in battle against the Göktürks in 583. When the wedding occurred, Emperor Wen authorized that the ceremony be as grand as if a princess were to be married.

When Emperor Wen subsequently summoned Li Min, intending to give him a mid-level official position, Princess Leping advised him to not thank the emperor until and unless the emperor bestowed him the high rank of Zhuguo (柱國) (second rank, first division, under Sui's nine-rank system). When Emperor Wen initially stated that he was going to give him the rank of Yitong (fourth rank, first division), Li Min therefore said nothing. Emperor Wen then mentioned Kaifu (開府, third rank, second division), and Li Min still said nothing. Emperor Wen finally said, "Princess Leping has achieved so much for me. How can I be stingy to her son-in-law? I will make you a Zhuguo." Only then did Li Min bow and thank the Emperor.

In 604, Emperor Wen died of illness and was succeeded by his son Yang Guang as Emperor Yang. Princess Leiping often attended to her brother, but on one occasion became a source of friction between him and his son Yang Jian (note different character than his grandfather), the Prince of Qi, as she once told Emperor Yang that a daughter of the Liu clan was beautiful, but Emperor Yang initially took no action. She then offered the woman to Yang Jian, who took her as a concubine. When Emperor Yang subsequently asked her about Lady Liu, she stated that she had already given her to Yang Jian, which brought displeasure to Emperor Yang.

In 609, while accompanying Emperor Yang on a visit to Zhangye, Princes Leiping grew ill and asked him to transfer her fief (five times the size of a usual ducal fief) to Li Min, stating that she was concerned for her daughter's future and therefore wanted her son-in-law to have her fief. Emperor Yang agreed. However, in 615, when Emperor Yang became suspicious of Li Min over popular rumors that the next emperor would be from the Li clan, he had his associate Yuwen Shu investigate the matter. Yuwen Shu persuaded Yuwen Eying that Li Min and his uncle Li Hun (李渾) (who had previously offended Yuwen Shu by refusing to pay Yuwen Shu a bribe that he had promised) were beyond help, and that she needed to save herself — and therefore got her to submit a confession stating that members of the Li clan were planning a coup to support Li Min as emperor. When Emperor Yang saw the confession, he believed the truth thereof and executed Li Hun, Li Min, and 30 other members of their clan. Several months later, Yuwen Eying was also poisoned to death.

== Ancestry ==
Yang Zhong, Duke of Sui
Yang Jian, Emperor Wen of Sui
Lady Lu
Yang Lihua
Dugu Xin, Duke of Wei
Dugu Qieluo, Empress Wenxian
Lady Cui

Chinese royalty
Preceded by Empress Ashina	Empress of Northern Zhou; 578–579	Succeeded by Empress Sima Lingji
