= Yuchi Jiong =

Yuchi Jiong (尉遲迥) (died 11 September 580), courtesy name Bojuluo (薄居羅), was a general of the Xianbei-led Western Wei and Northern Zhou dynasties of China. He first came to prominence while his uncle Yuwen Tai served as the paramount general of Western Wei, and subsequently served Northern Zhou after the Yuwen clan established the state after Yuwen Tai's death. In 580, believing that the regent Yang Jian had designs on the throne, Yuchi rose against Yang but was soon defeated. He committed suicide.

== During Western Wei ==
It is not known when Yuchi Jiong was born. His ancestors were a branch of the Tuoba tribe, which founded Northern Wei, and their subtribe was referred to as the Yuchi—and therefore took the name of the subtribe as the surname. His father Yuchi Qidou (尉遲俟兜) married an elder sister of Northern Wei's branch successor state Western Wei's paramount general Yuwen Tai, and they had two sons together—Yuchi Jiong and his brother Yuchi Gang (尉遲綱). (Yuchi Jiong's mother was later known as Princess Changle during Northern Zhou.) Yuchi Qidou died fairly early. Yuchi Jiong, who was said to be handsome, intelligent, and ambitious in his youth, served under his uncle Yuwen Tai, and married the Princess Jinming, the daughter of Emperor Wen of Western Wei. He showed talent both in military matters and in governance, and Yuwen Tai gave him increasingly important positions.

In 552, rival Liang Dynasty, in the aftermaths of the major rebellion by Hou Jing and Hou's death earlier that year, had two major claimants to its throne—Xiao Yi (Emperor Yuan of Liang), who controlled the central and eastern provinces, and Xiao Ji, who controlled the western provinces, both sons of the founding emperor Emperor Wu. Xiao Yi, under attack from Xiao Ji, requested aid from Western Wei—in the form of an attack to Xiao Ji's rear, against Xiao Ji's home province Yi Province (modern central Sichuan). Yuwen believed this to be a great opportunity for Western Wei to conquer the modern Sichuan and Chongqing region, but when he discussed the matters with the generals, most were in opposition. Yuchi, however, was supportive of the plan and advocated an immediate attack. Yuwen thus put him in command over six other generals to attack Xiao Ji's realm, and the attack was launched in spring 553. Yuchi quickly advanced to Xiao Ji's capital at Chengdu (成都, in modern Chengdu, Sichuan). Xiao Ji's army, which was then battling Xiao Yi near Xiao Yi's capital of Jiangling (江陵, in modern Jingzhou, Hubei), collapsed, and Xiao Ji was killed by Xiao Yi. After Yuchi had put Chengdu under siege for five months, Xiao Ji's cousin Xiao Hui (蕭撝) and son Xiao Yuansu (蕭圓肅), who were defending Chengdu, surrendered. The surrounding provinces also soon surrendered, and Western Wei had taken over Xiao Ji's domain. Yuwen made Yuchi the governor of Yi Province, in charge of 12 provinces centering Yi. In 554, six provinces were added to Yuchi's responsibility, for 18 provinces total. However, as Yuchi missed his mother deeply, and his mother was still at the capital Chang'an, Yuwen soon recalled him back to Chang'an.

== During Emperor Xiaomin's and Emperor Ming's reigns ==
Yuwen Tai died in 557, and his nephew Yuwen Hu, serving as the guardian for Yuwen Tai's son Yuwen Jue, forced Emperor Gong of Western Wei to yield the throne to Yuwen Jue in spring 558, ending Western Wei and establishing Northern Zhou, with Yuwen Jue as emperor (but using the alternative title "Heavenly Prince" (Tian Wang) (as Emperor Xiaomin). Emperor Xiaomin created Yuchi Jiong the Duke of Shu, in commemoration of his victory (as the modern Sichuan region was known in ancient times as the region of Shu). Later in 558, when Emperor Xiaomin tried to seize power from Yuwen Hu, Yuwen Hu deposed and then killed him, making Emperor Xiaomin's older brother Yuwen Yu the Duke of Ningdu emperor instead (as Emperor Ming). Yuchi Jiong's stance in this power struggle is not known, but his brother Yuchi Gang sided with Yuwen Hu.

Yuchi's activities during Emperor Ming's reign were not recorded in history. In 560, Emperor Ming was poisoned by Yuwen Hu. Emperor Ming's younger brother Yuwen Yong the Duke of Lu became emperor (as Emperor Wu).

== During Emperor Wu's reign ==
In 562, Yuchi Jiong became the Minister of the Army—one of the six departments of government, under a system designed by Yuwen Tai—although his actual authority over the army is not clear, as Yuwen Hu, as prime minister, also oversaw the armed forces. His brother Yuchi Gang served as Minister of Agriculture.

In winter 564, Yuwen Hu launched a major attack on rival Northern Qi, and Yuchi Jiong had the responsibility of attacking Luoyang along with Daxi Wu (達奚武) and Emperor Wu's brother Yuwen Xian the Duke of Qi, but the attack was ultimately unsuccessful and withdrawn.

In 568, Yuchi took on the even more honorific title of Taibao (太保) -- one of the three senior advisors to the emperor—but with unclear authorities.

In 572, Emperor Wu ambushed Yuwen Hu and killed him, taking over power personally. He made Yuchi Taishi (太師) -- one of the three senior advisors to him but slightly more honorific than Taibao.

In 576, Emperor Wu launched a major attack on Northern Qi, destroying it in 577 and taking over its territory. Yuchi's involvement, if any, in the campaign is unclear. (Note: Yuchi's reputation as a great general, often referred to by historians, makes it fairly inexplicable that references to his military involvement -- particularly in this major campaign where virtually all important Northern Zhou generals participated -- were exceedingly sparse after his victory over Xiao Ji's forces. One can perhaps speculate (but only speculate) that after his defeat by Yang Jian, Yang had references to him excised from Northern Zhou's official records.) In June 578, Emperor Wu died, and the crown prince Yuwen Yun became emperor (as Emperor Xuan).

== During Emperor Xuan's and Emperor Jing's reigns ==
In spring 579, Emperor Xuan established four new senior advisor posts, and he made, as those four, his uncle Yuwen Sheng (宇文盛) the Prince of Yue, Yuchi Jiong, Li Mu (李穆) the Duke of Shen, and Yang Jian the Duke of Sui (and his father-in-law, as the father of his wife Yang Lihua). He also made Yuchi in charge of the region around Xiang Province (相州, roughly modern Handan, Hebei) -- effectively, the region north of the Yellow River. Later that year, Emperor Xuan passed the throne to his young son Yuwen Chan (Emperor Jing), becoming retired emperor—but with the highly unusual title of "Emperor Tianyuan" (天元皇帝, Tianyuan Huangdi). He proceeded to rule in an erratic and cruel manner, causing officials to become alienated. His acts included raping Yuchi Jiong's granddaughter Yuchi Chifan, who had married Emperor Xuan's cousin Yuwen Liang (宇文亮)'s son Yuwen Wen (宇文溫) the Duke of Xiyang, causing Yuwen Liang to plot rebellion. When Yuwen Liang's plot was discovered, Emperor Xuan killed him and Yuwen Wen, seizing Lady Yuchi as a concubine and then creating him one of his five empresses—contrary to the tradition of creating only one empress.

In summer 580, Emperor Xuan died suddenly, and after Yang's friends and Emperor Xuan's associates Liu Fang (劉昉) and Zheng Yi (鄭譯) maneuvered behind the scenes by issuing an edict in Emperor Xuan's name, Yang became regent, and quickly took control of the political scene. As Yuchi had high reputation, Yang feared that Yuchi would oppose him, and therefore sent Yuchi's son Yuchi Dun (尉遲惇) the Duke of Wei'an to Xiang Province, summoning Yuchi back to the capital to attend Emperor Xuan's funeral and replacing him with the general Wei Xiaokuan.

Yuchi, believing that Yang was intending to seize the throne, instead announced an uprising against Yang, declaring that he was intending to protect Northern Zhou's imperial lineage. He took the son of Emperor Xuan's uncle Yuwen Zhao (宇文招) the Prince of Zhao and declared him emperor. A number of important generals declared for him—the chief of whom were Sima Xiaonan (司馬消難), who controlled the southern provinces, and Wang Qian (王謙), who controlled the southwestern provinces—but he was unable to persuaded Li Mu, who controlled the modern Shanxi region, to join him. He was also unable to get Northern Zhou's vassal state Western Liang (ruled by Xiao Kui, a great-grandson of Liang Dynasty's Emperor Wu) to join him.

Yuchi, despite his reputation, was by this point described as senile, entrusting most of his important matters to his secretary Cui Dana (崔達拏) and his second wife Lady Wang. Cui and Lady Wang's decisions were largely described as inappropriate ones, and the rebels made little advances. Soon, the central government forces, commanded by Wei, arrived at Yuchi's headquarters at Yecheng (鄴城, in modern Handan) and besieged it. When the city fell, just 68 days after Yuchi declared his rebellion, his son's father-in-law Cui Hongdu (崔弘度), who served under Wei, approached him, and gave him time to commit suicide. Yuchi did so, but only after hurling repeated insults at Yang Jian. His sons were killed.

During the reign of Emperor Gaozu of Tang (618-626), Yuchi Jiong's grandnephew Yuchi Qifu (尉遲耆福) submitted a petition to have Yuchi Jiong given a proper burial. Emperor Gaozu, because Yuchi Jiong was faithful to Northern Zhou, agreed.

== Family ==
Consort and issue

- Princess Jinming, of the Yuan clan (金明公主 元氏), daughter of Emperor Wen of Western Wei
  - Yuchi Yi, Duke of Zizhong Commandery (尉遲谊 资中郡公), first son
  - Lady Yuchi, Lady of Huiluo County ((尉迟氏 回洛县君), first daughter
    - Married Tuoba Jing (拓跋兢), Duke of Songzi （松滋公）
  - Yuchi Shun, Duke of Zuo (尉遲顺 胙国公), third son
  - Yuchi You, Duke of Xidu Commandery (尉遲祐 西都郡公), fifth son
- Lady Wang (王氏)
- Unknown
  - Yuchi Kuan, Duke of Zhangle Commandery (尉遲宽 长乐郡公), second son
  - Yuchi Dun, Duke of Wei'an Commandery (尉遲惇 魏安郡公), fourth son
  - Second Daughter
  - Lady Yuchi (尉迟氏), third daughter
    - Married Zhou Wei, Duke of Wen'an (文安縣開國公 周韙)
