= Yuchi Chifan =

Concubine of Chinese Northern Zhou dynasty Emperor Xuan (566-595)

- Born: 566
- Died: 595
- Spouse: Yuwen Wen, Duke of Xiyang; Emperor Xuan of Northern Zhou

Yuchi Chifan (Chinese: 尉遲熾繁) or Yuchi Fanchi (Chinese: 尉遲繁熾) (566 – 595), later Buddhist nun name Huashou (華首), was a concubine of the Emperor Xuan of the Northern Zhou dynasty of China.

Yuchi Chifan's grandfather Yuchi Jiong the Duke of Shu was a renowned general of Northern Zhou and a nephew of Yuwen Tai, Emperor Xuan's grandfather, making her and Emperor Xuan cousins. She initially married Yuwen Wen (宇文溫) the Duke of Xiyang—a son of Emperor Xuan's cousin Yuwen Liang (宇文亮) the Duke of Qi. She was said to be exceedingly beautiful. Sometime in or before 580, on an occasion when the wives of imperial clan members were, pursuant to the customs of the time, in the palace to greet the Emperor Xuan, Emperor Xuan was so infatuated by her beauty that he forced her to drink, and then raped her after she fell drunk. In spring 580, Yuwen Liang, angry and fearful over the incident, was one of the generals commanding troops against rival Chen dynasty. As the army withdrew from the borders after having captured the territory between the Yangtze and the Huai River in winter 579, Yuwen Liang made the plan to ambush the commander of the entire operation, Wei Xiaokuan, and then seize the entire army and support an uncle of Emperor Xuan to be emperor. The plot, however, was revealed by his staff member Ru Kuan (茹寬) to Wei, and when Yuwen Liang attacked Wei, Wei was prepared and defeated him. Yuwen Liang was killed in battle, and Emperor Xuan, then carrying the atypical title "Emperor Tianyuan" (天元皇帝, Tianyuan Huangdi) as retired emperor, then executed Yuwen Wen. He then summoned Yuchi Chifan to the palace and made her an imperial consort with the title Zhang Guifei (長貴妃). He soon further elevated her to the title of empress (of which his wife Yang Lihua and three other concubines already possessed) with the title Tianzuo Da Huanghou (天左大皇后), on 18 April 580.

Emperor Xuan died in June 580, and Empress Yang's father Yang Jian became regent to Emperor Xuan's son Emperor Jing. Empress Yuchi became a Buddhist nun with the name of Huashou. Her grandfather Yuchi Jiong subsequently rose against Yang Jian, but was defeated and committed suicide. His sons, and some other members of the Yuchi clan (but not the entire clan) were executed, although Empress Yuchi was not harmed. Yang Jian subsequently seized the throne and established Sui dynasty (as Emperor Wen), and she died in 595, during Emperor Wen's reign.
