= Zhu Manyue =

Zhu Manyue (Chinese: 朱滿月; 547–586), later known by her Buddhist name Fajing (法淨), was a concubine of Emperor Xuan (Yuwen Yun) of the Xianbei-led Northern Zhou dynasty of China. She was the mother of Emperor Jing (Yuwen Chan), last emperor of Northern Zhou.

Zhu Manyue was said to be from the Wu region, now southern Jiangsu. Because someone from her family, probably her father, was accused of crimes, she was forced to be a servant and assigned to the palace of Yuwen Yun, who was then crown prince under his father Emperor Wu. She was in charge of the clothes of Yuwen Yun, 12 years younger than her. On one occasion, he summoned her to have sexual relations with him; in July or August 573, she gave birth to his first son, Yuwen Yan (宇文衍), whose name was later changed to Yuwen Chan.

In 578 Emperor Wu died, and Yuwen Yun took the throne. He created Yuwen Chan crown prince, and after Emperor Xuan passed the throne to Yuwen Chan and became retired emperor in spring 579 (with the atypical title of "Emperor Tianyuan" (天元皇帝, Tianyuan Huangdi), he, in another unusual move, decided to create three (and later one more) additional empresses in addition to his wife, Yang Lihua, and Consort Zhu, on account of her being the mother of Emperor Jing, received the title of Empress Tianyuan (Tianyuan Di Hou, 天元帝后, a slightly less honored title than Empress Yang's Tianyuan Huanghou (天元皇后)), later changed to Tian Huanghou (天皇后), and then further changed in 580 to Tian Da Huanghou (天大皇后). It was said that she was not favored by him on account of her being much older and also of lowly birth.

Emperor Xuan died in 580, and Empress Yang's father Yang Jian became the regent. Three of Emperor Xuan's empresses, other than Empresses Yang and Zhu, became Buddhist nuns, but Empress Zhu did not at this point, and was honored as empress dowager (along with Empress Yang) but with the secondary title of Di Taihou (帝太后), lower than Empress Dowager Yang's title of Huang Taihou (皇太后). In 581, Yang Jian seized the throne from Emperor Jing, ending the Northern Zhou dynasty and establishing the Sui dynasty. The Emperor Jing and other members of the imperial Yuwen clan were soon slaughtered. Empress Dowager Zhu became a Buddhist nun and took the name Fajing. She died in 586 and was buried only with ceremonies due a Buddhist nun, west of the capital Chang'an.
