= Emperor Xuan of Northern Zhou =

Emperor of the Northern Zhou dynasty (559-580)

Emperor Xuan of Northern Zhou 北周宣帝

Emperor of Northern Zhou
- Reign: 22 June 578 (Note: wu'xu day of the 6th month of the 1st year of the Xuan'zheng era.) – 1 April 579
- Predecessor: Emperor Wu
- Successor: Emperor Jing
- Born: 559
- Died: 580 (aged 20–21)
- Burial: Ding Mausoleum (定陵)
- Consorts: Yang Lihua; Zhu Manyue; Chen Yueyi; Yuchi Chifan; Yuan Leshang
- Issue: Yuwen Eying; Yuwen Chan, Emperor Jing; Yuwen Kan, Prince of Lai; Yuwen Shu, Prince of Ying; Yuwen Xuan
Names
- Family name: Yuwen (宇文, yǔ wén); Given name: Yun (贇, yūn)
Era name and dates
- Dàchéng (大成): 579
Regnal name
- Emperor Tianyuan (天元皇帝) (adopted after abdicating in 579)
Posthumous name
- Emperor Xuan (宣皇帝)
Temple name
- None
- House: Yuwen
- Dynasty: Northern Zhou
- Father: Emperor Wu
- Mother: Empress Dowager Li

Emperor Xuan of Northern Zhou (北周宣帝) (559 – 22 June 580 (Note: According to Emperor Xuan's biography in Book of Zhou, he died aged 22 (by East Asian reckoning) on the jiyou day of the 5th month of the 2nd year of the Daxiang era. This corresponds to 22 Jun 580 on the Julian calendar. However, according to Yang Jian's biography in Book of Sui, Emperor Xuan died on the yiwei day of the same month and year. This corresponds to 8 Jun 580 in the Julian calendar. The Book of Zhou recorded that for the yi'wei day of that month, Emperor Xuan merely fell ill and returned to the palace; Bei Shi also had a similar record of Emperor Xuan's death as Zhou Shu, whereas the Zizhi Tongjian indicated that Emperor Xuan fell ill on the yi'wei day and died on the same day. In his Zizhi Tongjian Kaoyi, Sima Guang opinioned that since Yang Jian was hoping for an opportunity to execute a coup, it would be unreasonable to expect that he could keep his plans a secret for 15 days (if the account found in Book of Zhou was true). Thus, Tongjian adopted the account found in Yang Jian's biography in Book of Sui.)), personal name Yuwen Yun (宇文贇), courtesy name Qianbo (乾伯), was the fourth emperor of the Xianbei-led Northern Zhou dynasty of China. He was known in history as an erratic and wasteful ruler, whose actions greatly weakened the Northern Zhou regime. As part of that erratic behavior, he passed the throne to his son Emperor Jing in April 579, less than a year after taking the throne, and subsequently entitled not only his wife Yang Lihua empress, but four additional concubines as empresses. After his death in June 580, the government was taken over by his father-in-law Yang Jian, who soon deposed his son Emperor Jing, ending the Northern Zhou and establishing the Sui dynasty.

== Background ==
Yuwen Yun was born in 559, as the oldest son of Yuwen Yong, then the Duke of Lu and younger brother of Emperor Ming. He was born at Tong Province (同州, roughly modern Weinan, Shaanxi), as Yuwen Yong was at that time the governor of Tong Province. His mother Li Ezi was Yuwen Yong's concubine. (Note: Yuwen Yong had not yet officially married a wife by that point.)

In 560, Emperor Ming was poisoned to death by his cousin, the regent Yuwen Hu. Before he died, he willed that Yuwen Yong succeed him, and Yuwen Yong took the throne (as Emperor Wu). On 30 May 561, he created Yuwen Yun the Duke of Lu but did not create him crown prince. Only after Emperor Wu ambushed Yuwen Hu and killed him in 572 did he create Yuwen Yun crown prince, on 19 May. (Note: Yuwen Yun's mother Consort Li was not created empress, as Emperor Wu married Empress Ashina, the daughter of Tujue's Mugan Khan Ashina Qijin in 568.)

== As crown prince ==
Emperor Wu often sent Yuwen Yun on tours of the provinces—and when he himself would go on tours of the provinces or go on military campaigns, he would have Yuwen Yun guard the capital Chang'an.

On 30 October 573, Yuwen Yun married Yang Lihua, the daughter of the general Yang Jian the Duke of Sui, as his wife and crown princess.

It was around this time that it came to Emperor Wu's attention that most of Yuwen Yun's associates were men of low character. At the suggestion of the superintendent of the crown prince's palace, Yuwen Xiaobo (宇文孝伯), Emperor Wu made Yuchi Yun (尉遲運), the well-regarded nephew of the general Yuchi Jiong (a cousin of Emperor Wu's), Yuwen Xiaobo's deputy. He also chose a number of men whose characters he had high regard for to serve in other posts as the crown prince's assistance—but Yuwen Yun resented these personnel changes.

In April 574, when Emperor Wu's mother Empress Dowager Chinu died, Emperor Wu observed a mourning period for her, and during that period, Yuwen Yun served as regent.

In spring 576, Emperor Wu sent Yuwen Yun on a campaign against Tuyuhun as its nominal commander, but put Yuwen Xiaobo and Wang Gui (王軌) in actual command of the army. In fall 576, the army completed its campaign against Tuyuhun after reaching Tuyuhun's capital Fuqi (伏俟, in modern Haixi Mongol and Tibetan Autonomous Prefecture, Qinghai). Upon return to Chang'an, Wang Gui reported to Emperor Wu that Yuwen Yun and his trusted associates Zheng Yi (鄭譯) and Wang Duan (王端) had committed many immoral activities together. In anger, Emperor Wu battered Yuwen Yun and Zheng with a baton and removed Zheng from his post. Soon, however, Yuwen Yun reinstated Zheng to his post.

Historians also noted that Emperor Wu was very strict with the crown prince, treating him no easier than he did the officials. When he heard that Yuwen Yun liked drinking, he issued an edict forbidding any alcohol from entering the crown prince's palace, and whenever the crown prince had faults, he would whip or batter the crown prince, warning him, "Do you not know how many crown princes had been deposed in history? Is it that my other sons are unworthy of being crown prince?" He also ordered the officials at the crown prince's palace to watch the crown prince closely and submit reports on his actions. In reaction, Yuwen Yun suppressed his own behavior and pretended to have learned his lesson. Nevertheless, Wang Gui repeatedly suggested that Emperor Wu find a better heir, but Emperor Wu declined, because he believed his second son, Yuwen Zan (宇文贊) the Prince of Han to be even less competent than Yuwen Yun, and the other sons to be too young to be considered.

In 577, Emperor Wu destroyed rival Northern Qi, seizing its territory. In summer 578, however, he grew ill suddenly while preparing a campaign against Tujue, and he, after entrusting the important matters to Yuwen Xiaobo, died. Yuwen Yun took the throne as Emperor Xuan.

== Reign ==
Emperor Xuan honored his father Emperor Wu's wife Empress Ashina as empress dowager and created his wife Crown Princess Yang empress. Other than those proper acts, however, he began to carry out a number of inappropriate ones—including immediately promoting of Zheng Yi and having sexual relations with the ladies in waiting in his father's palace. It was also said that not only did he not mourn his father's death, but as he approached his father's casket, he touched the scars from the wounds his father had previously inflicted, and cursed, "Old man, you died too late!" He soon also honored his mother Consort Li as empress dowager (with the secondary title of Di Taihou (帝太后) to distinguish Empress Dowager Ashina's title Huang Taihou (皇太后)).

Upon hearing Emperor Wu's death, Gao Shaoyi, a Northern Qi prince who had claimed Northern Qi's imperial title in exile in Tujue, tried to launch an attack to reestablish Northern Qi, but was quickly repelled and forced to retreat to Tujue territory.

Emperor Xuan then turned to killing people that he feared or had grudges against. The first target was his uncle Yuwen Xian the Prince of Qi, due to the respect that Yuwen Xian commanded on account of his military abilities, along with Yuwen Xian's friends, the generals Wang Xing (王興), Dugu Xiong (獨孤熊), and Doulu Shao (豆盧紹). He then turned against Wang Gui, Yuwen Xiaobo, and Yuwen Shenju (宇文神舉) -- all close associates of Emperor Wu—as he suspected all of them of having spoken ill of him before Emperor Wu.

Emperor Xuan was obsessed with changing the customary protocols that his father had established, and in spring 579, he changed the official uniforms that Emperor Wu had standardized, to instead use the uniforms styled after Eastern Han dynasty and Cao Wei. He also abolished the penal code that his father had promulgated in 577 and declared several pardons, stating that he believed that Emperor Wu's punishments were too severe—but soon imposed an even more severe penal code. Also contrary to his father's prohibition of Buddhism and Taoism, he made public gestures to honor Taoism.

Also in spring 579, Emperor Xuan created his oldest son Yuwen Chan—then six-years-old—the Prince of Lu, and then crown prince. He also promoted Luoyang to the status of secondary capital, moving the subsidiary branches of the six central government departments from Northern Qi's old capital Yecheng (鄴城, in modern Handan, Hebei) to Luoyang.

Meanwhile, around this time, Tujue's Tuobo Khan (Empress Dowager Ashina's uncle) sought peace. Emperor Xuan, in response, created his cousin (the daughter of his uncle Yuwen Zhao (宇文招) the Prince of Zhao) Princess Qianjin, offering to marry Princess Qianjin to Tuobo Khan, but with the demand that Tuobo Khan surrender Gao Shaoyi. Tuobo Khan refused.

Less than a month after creating Yuwen Chan crown prince, Emperor Xuan formally passed the throne to Yuwen Chan (as Emperor Jing). Emperor Xuan himself claimed the atypical title of "Emperor Tianyuan" (天元皇帝, Tianyuan Huangdi), rather than the expected retired emperor title of Taishang Huang. He changed the name of his palace to Tian Tai (天台, "heavenly tower"), and doubled the number of tassels on his crown, as well as the number of imperial vehicles, litters, clothing, banners, and drums. He changed the name of the young emperor's palace to Zhengyang Palace (正陽宮), with the same complement of staff as his own palace. Empress Yang's title was changed to "Empress Dowager Tianyuan" (天元皇太后, Tianyuan Huang Taihou).

== As retired emperor ==
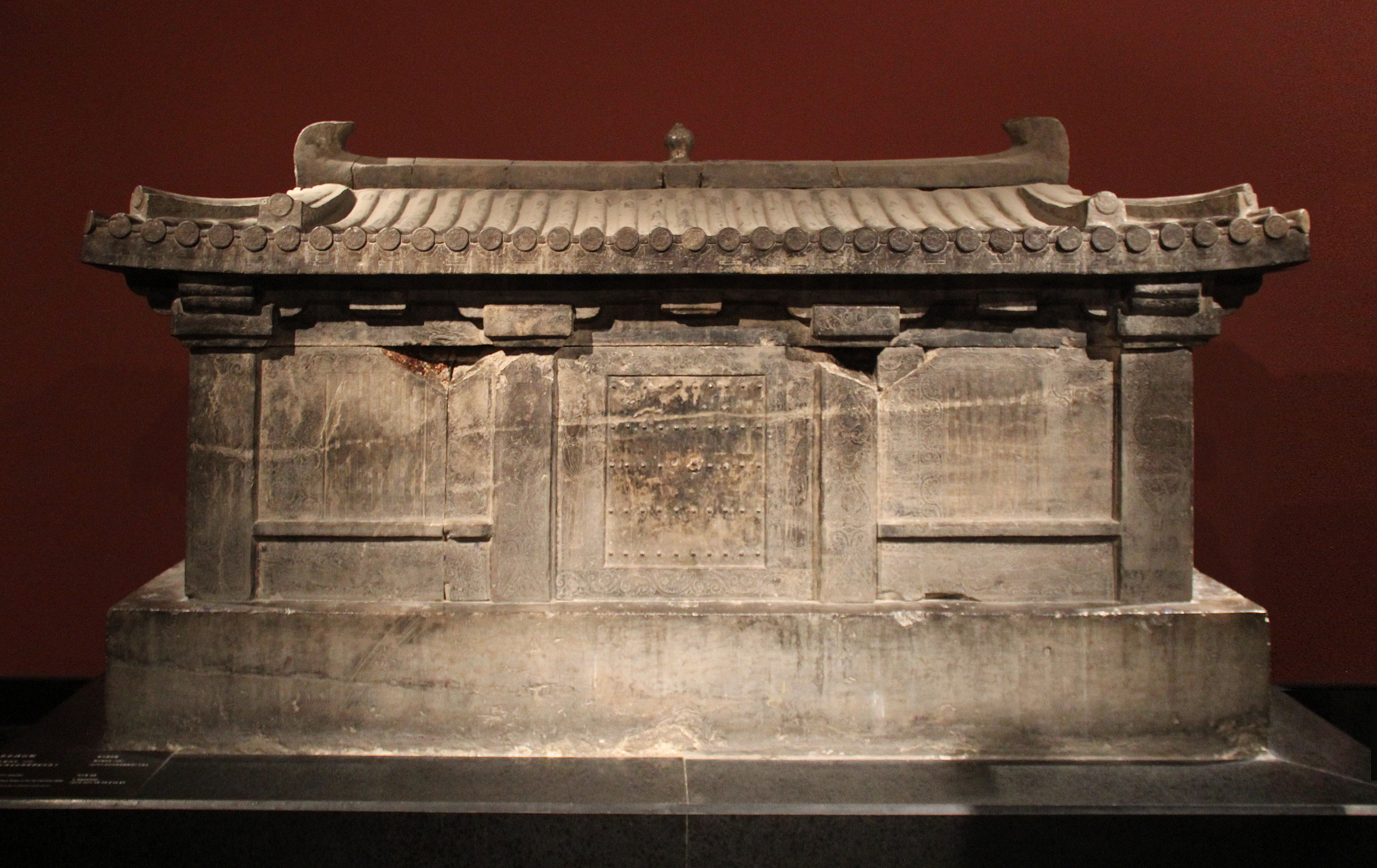
The sarcophagus of Li Jingxun, the granddaughter of Emperor Xuan, who died at the age of nine in 608

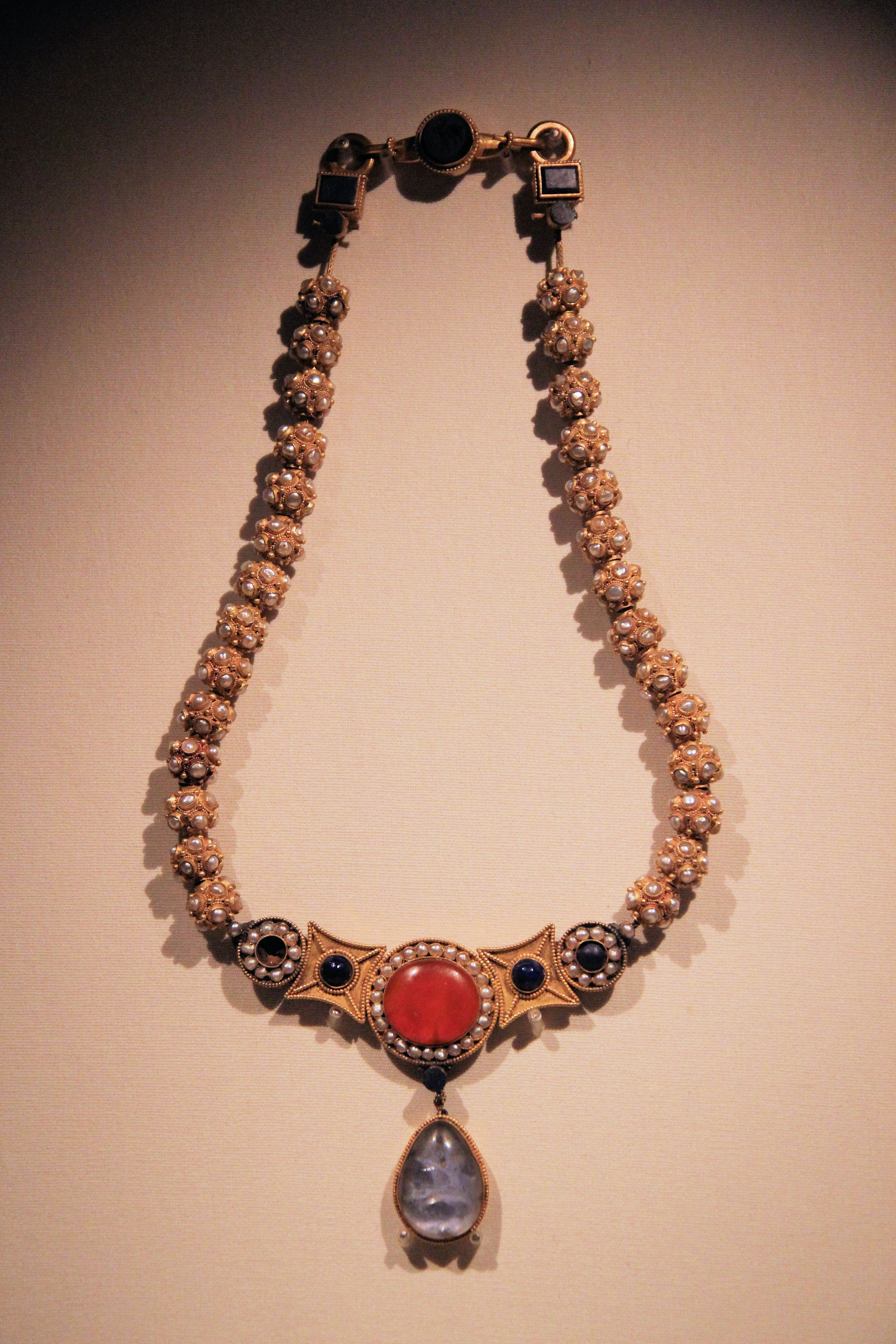
Li Jingxun's necklace

Historians described that after Emperor Xuan passed the throne to Emperor Jing, he became particularly wasteful, megalomanic, and unrestrained. He referred to himself as "Heaven," and required officials who were to visit him to have vegetarian diets for three days and bathe—then customary for the days spent before worshipping a god. He disallowed officials from using belts or decorations for their clothing, and he forbade the use of such characters as "heaven" (天), "high" (高), "upper" (上), and "grand" (大), except by himself. He forbade women, other than the women of the palace, from using cosmetics, and for reasons unknown, he ordered that all wheels be made from single pieces of wood, disallowing assembling.

It was further recorded that whenever Emperor Xuan met with officials, he only discussed with them how to change customs or how to build palaces, disregarding the affairs of state. He spent his days in games and tours, wearing out his attendants. The officials often were caned—initially, 120 times per caning, and later increased to 240 times. The terror imposed on the officials and even the women of the palace was so great that no one dared to say anything.

In summer 579, Emperor Xuan created Emperor Jing's mother Consort Zhu Manyue "Empress Tianyuan" (天元帝后, Tianyuan Di Hou). He also set up fiefs for his uncles Yuwen Zhao, Yuwen Chun (宇文純) the Prince of Chen, Yuwen Sheng (宇文盛) the Prince of Yue, Yuwen Da (宇文達) the Prince of Dai, and Yuwen You (宇文逌) the Prince of Teng, and sent them away from Chang'an, to their fiefs.

In fall 579, in a highly unorthodox action, Emperor Xuan created two more empresses -- Consort Yuan Leshang as "Heavenly Right Empress" (天右皇后, Tian You Huanghou) and Consort Chen Yueyi as "Heavenly Left Empress" (天左皇后, Tian Zuo Huanghou), changing Empress Zhu's title to "Heavenly Empress" (天皇后, Tian Huanghou). Also around this time, when Yuchi Chifan the daughter-in-law of his cousin Yuwen Liang (宇文亮) the Duke of Qi was at the palace to greet him, he raped her.

In winter 579, Emperor Xuan officially ended the prohibitions against Taoism and Buddhism that Emperor Wu had declared, and he personally sat with the statues of Buddhist and Taoist deities. He also launched a major attack on rival Chen dynasty. By spring 580, the Northern Zhou army had taken the territory between the Yangtze River and the Huai River from Chen. As the army was withdrawing, Yuwen Liang, serving as a general on the campaign, tried to ambush his commander Wei Xiaokuan and seize Wei's troops, and then declare a rebellion to support one of his uncles as emperor. Wei found out about Yuwen Liang's plot and was able to repel his attack, and was able to kill him. Emperor Xuan then also killed Yuwen Liang's son Yuwen Wen (宇文溫) the Duke of Xiyang, and then took Yuwen Wen's wife Duchess Yuchi as a consort. Then, against opposition that he already had too many empresses, he created her as another empress.

By this point, Emperor Xuan was becoming even more erratic in his behavior, and at one point, he became suddenly angry at Empress Yang and wanted to punish her. She, however, remained calm but firm in defense of herself, which made him more angry, and he ordered her to commit suicide. Empress Yang's mother, Duchess Dugu Qieluo, had to plead earnestly for Empress Yang's life, before he finally spared Empress Yang. Meanwhile, however, Emperor Xuan was suspicious of the abilities of Empress Yang's father Yang Jian, and he considered killing Yang Jian but ultimately did not do so. As Yang Jian and Zheng Yi were friends, Yang Jian made a secret request to Zheng to give him a post away from the capital, and soon, by Zheng's recommendation, Emperor Xuan made Yang Jian the commander of the forces against Chen (as he then prepared another attack against Chen).

Before the army could depart, however, Emperor Xuan suddenly grew ill in summer 580. He summoned his associates Liu Fang (劉昉) and Yan Zhiyi (顏之儀) to try to entrust the affairs to them, but when they arrived, he was already unable to speak. Liu, after consulting with fellow attendants Zheng, Liu Qiu (柳裘), Wei Mo (韋謨), and Huangfu Ji (皇甫績), decided to summon Yang Jian to attend to Emperor Xuan and to serve as regent if Emperor Xuan should die—against Yan's attempt to have Yuwen Zhao made regent. Yang initially declined, apparently fearing that it was a trap, but eventually arrived at the palace. That night, Emperor Xuan died, and Yang seized the control of the palace and the imperial troops. Within a year, Yang would seize the throne, ending Northern Zhou and establishing the Sui dynasty.

== Era name ==
- Dacheng (大成 dà chéng) 579

== Family ==
Consorts and issue:

- Empress, of the Yang clan (皇后 楊氏; 561–609), personal name Lihua (麗華)
  - Yuwen Eying (宇文娥英, 578–615), second daughter
    - Married Li Min (李敏; 576–614), a son of Li Chong (李崇), and had issue (one daughter)
- Empress, of the Zhu clan (皇后 朱氏; 547–586), personal name Manyue (滿月)
  - Yuwen Chan, Emperor Jing (靜皇帝 宇文闡; 573–581), first son
- Empress, of the Chen clan (皇后 陳氏; 565–650), personal name Yueyi (月儀)
- Empress, of the Yuan clan of Henan (皇后 河南元氏; 565 – ?), personal name Leshang (樂尚)
- Empress, of the Yuchi clan (皇后 尉遲氏; 566–595), personal name Chifan (熾繁)
- Lady, of the Wang clan (王氏)
  - Yuwen Kan, Prince of Lai (萊王 宇文衎; ? – 581), second son
- Lady, of the Huangfu clan (皇甫氏)
  - Yuwen Shu, Prince of Ying (郢王 宇文術; ? – 581), third son
- Unknown
  - Yuwen Xuan (宇文昡; 577 – 16 September 594), first daughter

== Notes ==
Regnal titles
Preceded by Emperor Wu of Northern Zhou	Emperor of Northern Zhou; 578–579	Succeeded by Emperor Jing of Northern Zhou
