= Emperor Jing of Northern Zhou =

Emperor Jing of Northern Zhou 北周靜帝

Emperor of Northern Zhou
- Reign: April 1, 579 – March 4, 581
- Predecessor: Emperor Xuan
- Regent: Emperor Xuan (1 April 579 – 22 June 580); Yang Jian (23 June 580–581)
- Born: 573
- Died: 581 (aged 7–8)
- Burial: Gong Mausoleum (恭陵)
- Consorts: Empress Sima Lingji of Henei
Full name
- Family name: Yǔwén (宇文); Given name: Initially Yǎn (衍), later Chǎn (闡)
Era dates
- Dàxiàng (大象): 579-581; Dàdìng (大定): 581
Posthumous name
- Emperor Jìng (靜皇帝, "silent")
- House: Yuwen
- Dynasty: Northern Zhou
- Father: Emperor Xuan
- Mother: Zhu Manyue

Emperor Jing of Northern Zhou ((北)周靜帝) (July or August 573 – 10 July 581), personally name né Yuwen Yan (宇文衍), later Yuwen Chan (宇文闡), was the fifth and last emperor of the Xianbei-led Chinese Northern Zhou dynasty. He became emperor at the age of six, after his father Emperor Xuan formally passed the throne to him, but Emperor Xuan retained the imperial powers. After Emperor Xuan's death in 580, the official Yang Jian, the father of Emperor Xuan's wife Yang Lihua, seized power as regent. Yang soon defeated the general Yuchi Jiong, who tried to resist him, and in 581 had the young Emperor Jing yield the throne to him, ending Northern Zhou and establishing the Sui dynasty. Yang soon had the young emperor, as well as other members of Northern Zhou's imperial Yuwen clan, put to death.

== Background ==
Yuwen Chan was born in 573, initially with the name Yuwen Yan. (It is not known when the name was changed to Yuwen Chan.) His father Yuwen Yun was then crown prince under Yuwen Chan's grandfather Emperor Wu, and Yuwen Chan was his oldest son. Yuwen Chan's mother Zhu Manyue was Yuwen Yun's concubine, who, on account of her low birth, was not made Yuwen Yun's wife. Rather, nine months after Yuwen Chan's birth, Yuwen Yun married Yang Lihua, the daughter of the general Yang Jian the Duke of Sui, as his wife and crown princess.

Emperor Wu died in summer 578, and Yuwen Yun took the throne as Emperor Xuan. On 22 February 579, Emperor Xuan created Yuwen Chan, then six-years-old, as the Prince of Lu—echoing the title of Duke of Lu that both Emperors Wu and Xuan carried prior to their becoming emperor. 15 days later, on 9 March, Emperor Xuan created Yuwen Chan crown prince. Less than a month later, Emperor Xuan formally passed the throne to Yuwen Chan (as Emperor Jing), Emperor Xuan himself becoming retired emperor (with the atypical title of "Emperor Tianyuan" (天元皇帝, Tianyuan Huangdi). Emperor Jing's palace became known as Zhengyang Palace (正陽宮), and he received the same complement of staff as his father Emperor Xuan.

== As emperor ==
Emperor Xuan, even though he formally passed the throne to Emperor Jing, retained imperial powers, and there was no indication that the young Emperor Jing exercised any actual authority.

In summer 579, because Emperor Jing was now emperor, Emperor Xuan created Emperor Jing's mother Consort Zhu the special title of "Empress Tianyuan" (天元帝后, Tianyuan Di Hou), slightly subordinate to the title of Emperor Xuan's wife Empress Yang.

In fall 579, Emperor Jing formally married Sima Lingji, the daughter of the general Sima Xiaonan (司馬消難) as his wife and empress, and she carried the semi-official title of "Empress Zhengyang" (正陽皇后) to distinguish her from Emperor Xuan's empresses.

In summer 580, the erratic Emperor Xuan died. Empress Yang's father Yang Jian quickly took control of power and served as regent. The general Yuchi Jiong, believing that Yang's intentions were to seize the throne, rose in rebellion, and he was joined by Sima Xiaonan and Wang Qian (王謙). The central government forces, following Yang's orders under the command of the general Wei Xiaokuan, quickly defeated Yuchi, forcing Yuchi to commit suicide. Wang was also defeated and killed, while Sima Xiaonan fled to rival Chen dynasty. On account of Sima Xiaonan's resistance of Yang Jian, Emperor Jing's wife Empress Sima was deposed.

Prior to Yuchi's rebellion, Yang Jian, apprehensive that Emperor Jing's granduncles Yuwen Zhao (宇文招) the Prince of Zhao, Yuwen Chun (宇文純) the Prince of Chen, Yuwen Sheng (宇文盛) the Prince of Yue, Yuwen Da (宇文達) the Prince of Dai, and Yuwen You (宇文逌) the Prince of Teng, whom Emperor Xuan had sent to their fiefs, would resist him, summoned them to the capital Chang'an. Soon, believing that the princes would act against him, he first executed Yuwen Xian (宇文賢) the Prince of Bi (Emperor Xuan's cousin). When Yuwen Zhao did subsequently carry out an attempted assassination of Yang, Yang had Yuwen Zhao and Yuwen Sheng as well as their households put to death. Following Yuchi's defeat, Yang continued to execute the princes in earnest. Around the new year 581, he had Emperor Jing create him the Prince of Sui and bestow the nine bestowments on him. Two months later, he had Emperor Jing yield the throne to him, ending Northern Zhou and establishing the Sui dynasty, with Yang taking the throne as its Emperor Wen.

== Death ==
Emperor Wen created the young emperor the Duke of Jie. However, he had all of close male clansmen of the duke—all other male descendants of Emperor Jing's great-grandfather Yuwen Tai—put to death, as well as Emperor Jing's brothers Yuwen Kan (宇文衎) the Duke of Lai and Yuwen Shu (宇文術), the Duke of Yan. He also executed those of Yuwen Tai's elder brother Yuwen Hao. About three months later, Emperor Wen had the Duke of Jie secretly assassinated as well, but pretended to be shocked and declared a mourning period, and then buried him with honors due an emperor. The dukedom was passed to a distant relative, Yuwen Luo (宇文洛).

== Family ==
Consorts:

- Empress, of the Sima clan of Henei (皇后 河內司馬氏), personal name Lingji (令姬)

Chinese royalty
Preceded by Emperor Xuan of Northern Zhou	Emperor of Northern Zhou; 579–581	Dynasty ended
Preceded by Emperor Xuan of Northern Zhou	Emperor of China (Northern/Western); 579–581	Succeeded by Emperor Wen of Sui
