= House of Li =

Chinese imperial family

Li 李
- Imperial House of China
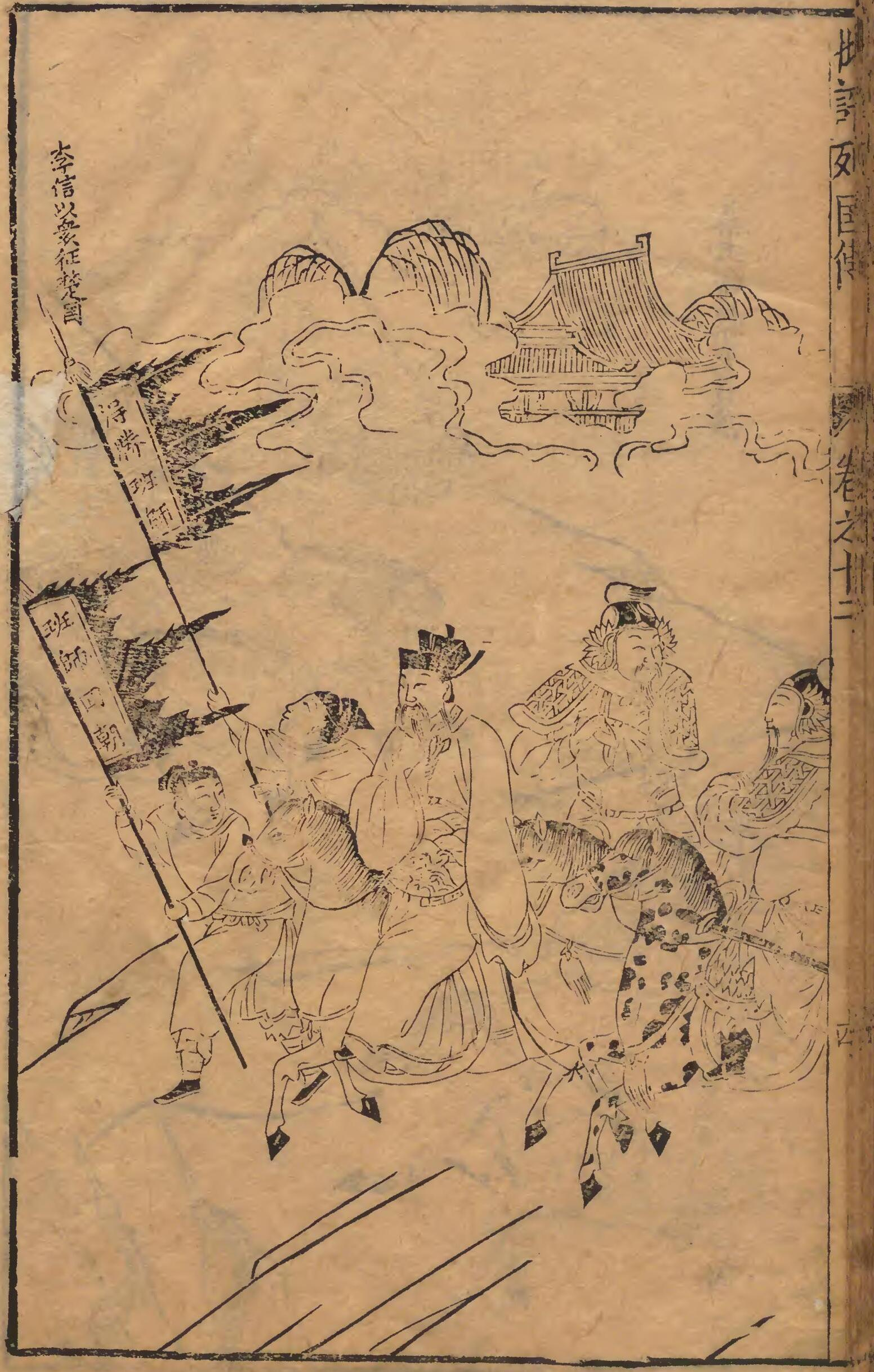

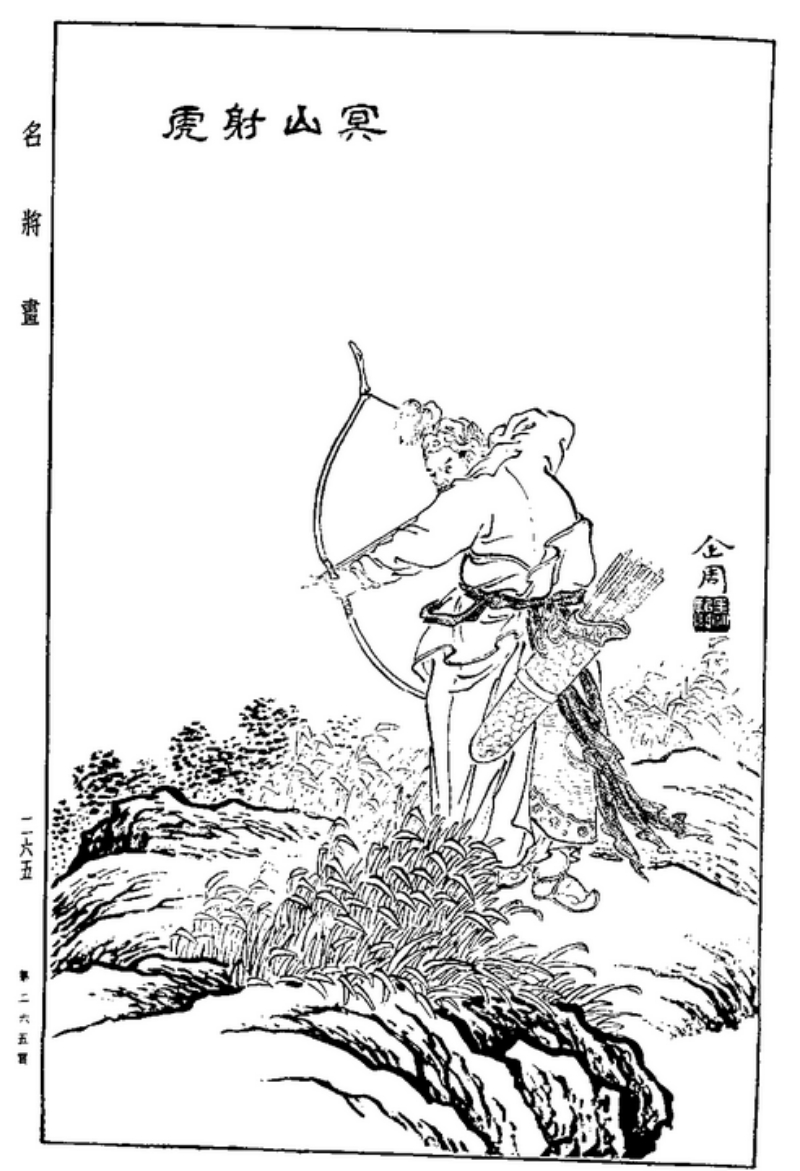

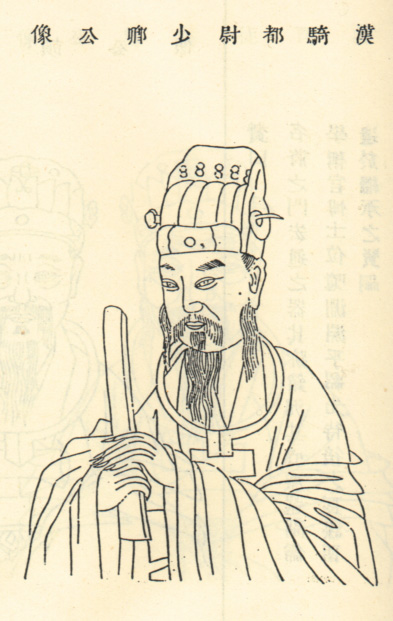

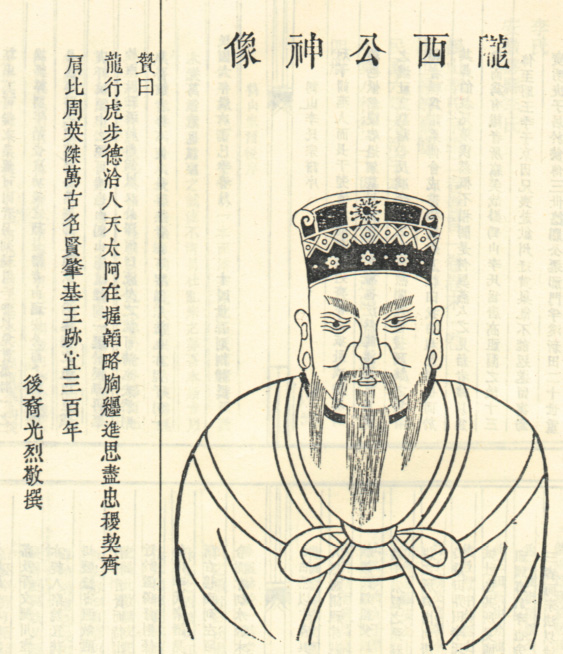

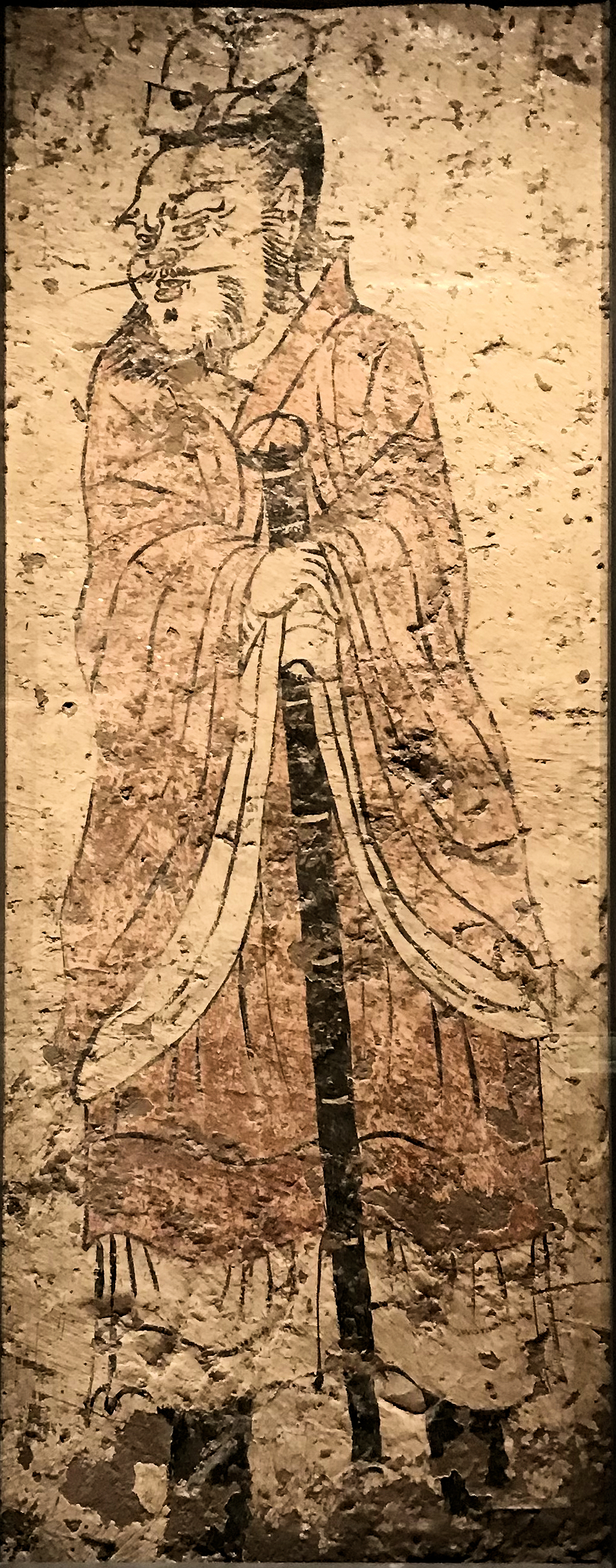

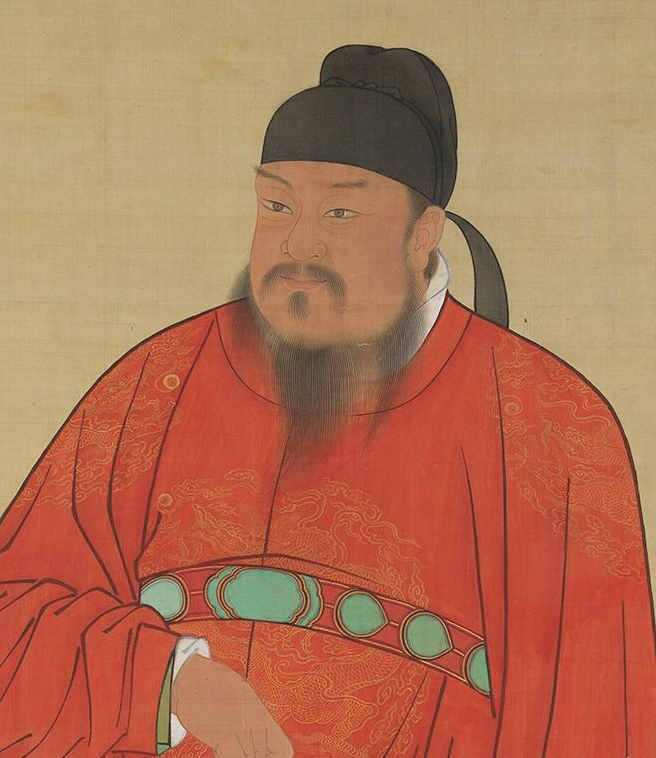

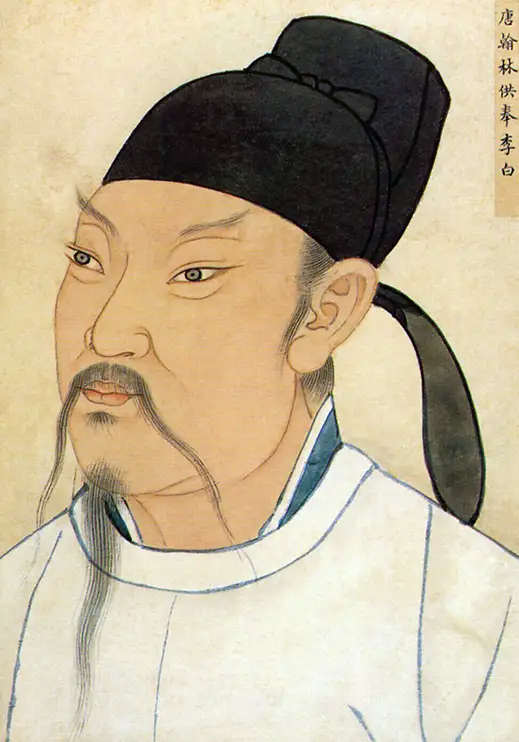

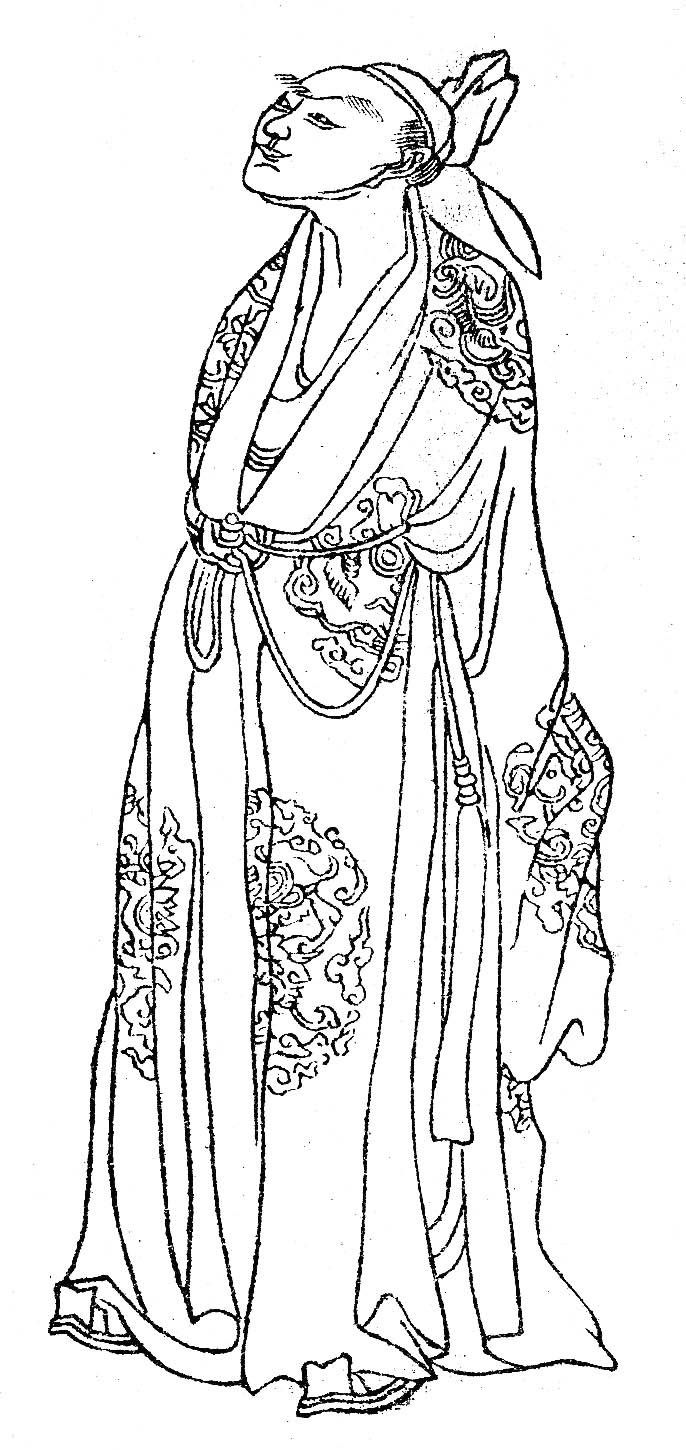
Li Xin	Li Guang	Li Ling	Li Gao	Li Xian
Li Yuan	Li Bai	Li He
- Country: Western Liang; Tang dynasty
- Founder: Laozi
- Final ruler: Emperor Ai of Tang
- Titles: Duke of (Western) Liang; Emperor of Tang
- Connected families: Ajo (阿熱) clan of the Kyrgyz Khaganate

The House of Li (Chinese: 李; pinyin: Lǐ; Wade–Giles: Li), also known as the Li clan of Longxi (隴西李氏), was the ruling house of the Western Liang and the Tang dynasty of China.

== Family information ==
The Li family originated in the Longxi Commandery and had Han ethnic origins. They were also known as the Longxi Li lineage (隴西李氏), which included the famous Tang poet Li Bai. The Li family were members of the northwest military aristocracy prevalent during the Sui dynasty.

According to the official records of Tang dynasty, the Li family was paternally descended from the famous Daoist sage Laozi (whose personal name was Li Dan or Li Er), as well as the Qin dynasty general Li Xin and the Han dynasty general Li Guang, and Li Gao, the ethnic Han ruler of Western Liang dynasty. During the late Northern and Southern dynasties period, the Li family intermarried with Xianbei royalty when Li Bing (the ethnically Han father of the first Tang emperor) married the part-Xianbei Duchess Dugu (the daughter of prominent Xianbei general Dugu Xin). Marriages between elite Han men and Xianbei princesses were common in this period, as the Northern Wei had arranged for Han elites to marry daughters of the Xianbei Tuoba imperial family since the 480s CE. More than half of the Tuoba Xianbei princesses of the Northern Wei were married to Han men from the imperial families and aristocrats from the Southern dynasties, who had defected and moved north to join the Northern Wei.

The Khagans of the Yenisei Kyrgyz Khaganate also claimed Longxi Li ancestry, through descent from the Han dynasty general Li Ling. Li Ling, a grandson of Li Guang, had defected from the Han dynasty to the Xiongnu in the first century BCE. For this reason, the Kyrgyz Khagan was recognized as a member of the Tang imperial family. Emperor Zhongzong of Tang even said to the Kyrgyz that "Your nation and Ours are of the same ancestral clan (Zong). You are not like other foreigners."

The Tang Imperial family was watched over by the Zongcheng si (宗正寺). Other prominent members of the Longxi Li lineage from the Tang period included generals Li Jing and Li Jiongxiu, chancellors Li Yiyan, Li Kui, Li Wei, Li Fengji, and Li Zhaode, the official Li Zhongyan, and the poet Li Bai. The Tang Imperial Longxi Li lineage also included sub lineages like the Guzang Li (姑臧 ), from which Li Zhuanmei (李專美) came from, who served the Later Jin.

During the Tang dynasty the Li family of Zhaojun (趙郡李氏), the Cui clan of Boling, the Cui clan of Qinghe, the Lu clan of Fanyang, the Zheng family of Xingyang (滎陽鄭氏), the Wang family of Taiyuan (太原王氏), and the Li family of Longxi (隴西李氏) were the seven noble families between whom marriage was banned by law.

In more recent times, some scholars have speculated that the Tang imperial family might have modified its genealogy to conceal Xianbei heritage. They cite as an example the Northern Zhou General Li Xian, who claimed descent from the Han general Li Ling, but whose tomb indicates that he had distant Xianbei ancestry. There is however no direct evidence that the Tang imperial family carried out such actions.

The House of Li did not simply disappear when the Tang dynasty ended in 907. Members of the former imperial family and families claiming descent from them continued to appear in historical records during later dynasties. However, the evidence becomes less certain over time, so it is important to distinguish between well-documented descendants and later genealogical claims.

The rulers of the Later Tang also used the surname Li, but they were not necessarily descendants of the original Tang imperial family. Their ruling family came from the Shatuo people and had received the surname Li during the Tang period. Because of this, the Later Tang should not automatically be considered a direct continuation of the bloodline of Li Yuan or Li Shimin.

The Southern Tang rulers made a stronger claim to Tang ancestry. Its founder, Li Bian, claimed that he descended from Li Ke, a prince of the Tang imperial family. He restored the surname Li and named his state Tang in order to present himself as a continuation of the earlier dynasty. Historians generally treat this as a claimed genealogy rather than a completely proven line of descent.

During the Later Jin dynasty of the Five Dynasties period, there were dukedoms (二王三恪) established for the descendants of the Northern Zhou, Sui, and Tang imperial families.

During the Song dynasty, several families were described as descendants of the Tang imperial clan. One notable example is the painter Li Cheng, who was traditionally said to descend from members of the Tang royal family who had moved away from the old political centers during the wars that followed the fall of the Tang.

Records from the Yuan dynasty also mention Li families that claimed Tang imperial ancestry. Some family inscriptions state that their ancestors had belonged to the Tang imperial clan and had fled to southern China during the rebellions and warfare of the late Tang period.

Similar claims continued during the Ming dynasty. Certain officials and regional Li families were recorded as having ancestors from the Tang imperial house. By this period, however, many of these traditions depended heavily on family genealogies and local records rather than on an unbroken series of contemporary documents.

During the Qing dynasty, numerous Li clan genealogies continued to trace their ancestry back to the Tang imperial family. Some identified themselves with particular branches of the Tang princes or with the older Longxi Li clan. These traditions became an important part of family identity, but they do not always provide enough historical evidence to prove direct biological descent.

Some of the Tang dynasty Imperial family's cadet branches ended up in Fujian. The branch founded by Li Dan (李丹) became prominent during the Song dynasty, as did another founded by Li Fu (李富). Descendants of the Tang Emperors now live in Chengcun village, near the Wuyi Mountains in Fujian.

The Hu family of Xidi are descended from Hu Shiliang, of Wuyuan, who was a descendant of Hu Changyi, a son of Emperor Zhaozong of Tang who was adopted by the Wuyuan Hu family.

== People ==
- Laozi
- Li Xin (Qin)
- Li Mu
- Li Xin (Western Liang)
- Li Guang (Han general)
- Li Ling
- Li Rangyi
- Li Fengji
- Li Gao (Founder of Western Liang dynasty)
- Li Wei (Tang dynasty)
- Li Bai (Tang poet)
- Li Yiyan
- Li Hui (Tang dynasty)
- Li Shi (Tang dynasty)
- Li Yuanhong (Tang chancellor)
- Li Ke
- Li Borui
- Li Yu (Last Southern Tang ruler)
- Li Cheng (Song painter)
- Li Zhongrong (Song minister)
- Li Zhigang (Ming minister)
- Li Shuzheng (Ming minister)
- Li Guangdi (Qing Grand Secretary)

== Family tree ==
Tang dynasty	dotted line denotes passage of more than one generation
Li Er 李耳, alias Li Dan 李聃 d.? Laozi 老子
Li Zong 李宗; Courtesy name Zunzu 字尊祖; Forestry official in the State of Wei 魏國木大夫
Li Tong 李同; Grand General in the State of Zhao 趙國大將軍
Li Dui 李兌; Prime Minister of the State of Zhao 趙國丞相
Li Ji 李躋; Lord of Yang'an in the State of Zhao 趙國陽安君
Li Ke 李恪; Courtesy name Daohong 字道弘; Tutor to the crown prince of the State of Qin 秦國太子太傅
Li Xingzu 李興族, alias Li Wang，一名李汪; Courtesy name Yushen 字育神; General in the State of Qin 秦國將軍
Li Tan 李曇; Courtesy name Guiyuan 字貴遠; Marquis of Bairen county in the State of Zhao, moved to the State of Qin and became its Supreme Censor 趙國柏人縣侯、入秦國為御史大夫
Li Chong 李崇; Courtesy name Bo 字伯 (Note: the family line of the Li of Longxi started from him) 注：隴西李氏房系始於此; Prefect of Longxi and Duke of Nanzheng 隴西郡太守、南鄭公
Li Pingyao 李平瑤; Courtesy name Neide 字內德; Prefect of Nan and Marquis of Didao 南郡太守、狄道侯
Li Xin 李信; Courtesy name Youcheng 字有成; Grand General and enfeoffed as Marquis of Longxi 大將軍、隴西侯
Li Chao 李超 alias Li Kang 一名伉; Courtesy name Rengao 字仁高; Grand General of the Han and Prefect of Yuyang 漢大將軍、漁陽郡太守
Li Zhongxiang 李仲翔; Prefect of Hedong also held the military rank of General Who Conquers the West 河東郡太守、征西將軍
Li Bokao 李伯考; Prefect of Longxi and Hedong 隴西、河東二郡太守
Li Shang 李尚; Magistrate of Chengji county 成紀縣令
Li Guang 李廣 d.119 BC; General of Front Guard during the Han dynasty 前將軍
Li Gan 李敢; Courtesy name Youqing 字幼卿; Minister of the Imperial Bodyguard and Marquis of Guannei 郎中令、關內侯	Li Danghu 李當戶
Li Yu 李禹; Courtesy name Zitong 字子通	Li Ling李陵 d.74 BC; General of the Han dynasty
Li Chenggong 李丞公; Courtesy name Chenggong 字丞公; Prefect of Henan 河南郡太守	Yenisei Kirghiz Khagans (surname Are 阿熱氏; Khans of the Kirghiz Khaganate all claimed descent from Li Ling during the Tang dynasty
Li Xian 李先; Courtesy name Jingzong 字敬宗; Prefect of Shu and Beiping 蜀、北平二郡太守
Li Zhangzong 李長宗; Courtesy name Boli 字伯禮; Secretary to the Prefect of Yuyang 漁陽郡丞
Li Junkuang 李君況; Courtesy names Shu 字叔 and Ziqi 一字子期; Imperial Savant, Court Consultant and Intermediate Minister 博士、議郎、太中大夫
Li Ben 李本; Courtesy name Shangming 字上明; Served as Court Attendant and Censor 郎中、侍御史
Li Cigong 李次公; Courtesy name Zhongjun 字仲君; Prefect of Ba and Captain of the Western Barbarians (in modern day Sichuan) 巴郡太守、西夷校尉
Li Gui 李軌; Courtesy name Wenyi 字文逸; Prefect of Linhuai in Wei of the Three Kingdoms, later Minister of Farming 三國魏臨淮郡太守、司農卿
Li Long 李隆; Courtesy name Yanxu 字彥緒; Magistrate of Chang'an and General of Massed Crossbows 長安令、積弩將軍
Li Ai 李艾; Courtesy name Shiji 字世績; General of Cavalry and Prefect of Wei in the Western; Jin 西晉驍騎將軍、魏郡太守
Li Yong 李雍; Courtesy name Junxi 字俊熙; Prefect of Jibei and Dongguan in the Western Jin. 濟北、東莞二郡太守
Li Yan 李弇; Courtesy name Jizi 字季子; Served Zhang Jun, king of the Former Liang, as Prefect of Tianshui, General of the Bodyguard, and Marquis of Anxi Pavilion. 前涼張駿天水郡太守、武衛將軍、安西亭侯
Li Chang 李昶; Courtesy name Zhongjian 字仲堅; Lecturer to the Crown; Prince of the Former; Liang 前涼太子侍講
Li Gao 李暠 d.417AD; Courtesy name Xuansheng 字玄盛; King Wuzhao of the Western Liang (founded Western Liang in 400 AD) and posthumously titled of Emperor; Xingsheng 西涼武昭王、興聖皇帝; Prince Wuzhao of (Western); Liang (西)涼武昭王主
Li Xin 李歆 d. 420; Courtesy name Shiye 字士業; Sovereign of Western Liang 西涼後主; Sovereign of Western Liang 西涼君主	Li Xun李恂 d. 421; Sovereign of Western Liang 西涼君主; Sovereign of Western Liang 西涼君主
Li Chong'er 李重耳; Courtesy name Jingshun 字景順; When the Western Liang was conquered [by the Northern Liang in 421], he fled to the Liu-Song and was appointed Prefect of Runan. Later, when the Northern Wei conquered Yuzhou province he surrendered to them and was appointed Prefect of Hengnong. Yuzhou was then recaptured by General Xue Andu of the Song. Later served as General Who Subdues the South and Governor of Yuzhou under the Northern Wei. 以國亡奔宋，為汝南郡太守 北魏克豫州，以地歸之，拜恒農郡太守， 複為宋將薛安都所陷，北魏安南將軍、豫州刺史
Li Xi 李熙; Courtesy name Mengliang 字孟良; General garrisoning Jinmen under the Northern Wei. Posthumously given the title Xianzu by the Tang dynasty 北魏金門鎮將。（唐獻祖）
Li Tianci 李天賜 or Li Tianxi 李天錫; Courtesy name Dezhen 字德真; Posthumously given the title Tang Yizu（唐懿祖）
Li Hu 李虎 d.551 Courtesy name Wenbin 字文彬; Grand Pillar-of-the-State General under the Northern Zhou, and enfeoffed as Duke Xiang of the Duchy of Tang. Posthumously titled as Tang Taizu. 北周柱國大將軍、唐國襄公。（唐太祖） Duke of Longxi 隴西郡公
Li Bing 李昺 d.572 Courtesy name Dezhen 字德真; Military Superintendent of Anzhou under the Northern Zhou, Grand Pillar-of-the-State General, and Duke Ren of Tang. Posthumously; Tang Daizu. 北周安州總管、柱國大將軍、 唐國仁公。（唐代祖）Duke of Tang 唐國公
Li Yuan 李淵 566–635; Gaozu 高祖; 618–626
1	2	4
Li Jiancheng 李建成 589–626; Cr.Prince Yin 隱太子	Li Shimin 李世民 599–649; Taizong 太宗; 626–649	Li Yuanji 李元吉 603–626; Prince of Qi 齊王
3	8
Li Ke 李恪 d. 653; Prince of Yulin 鬱林王	Li Zhen 李貞 d. 688; Prince Jing of Yue 越敬王
1	4	9	ZHOU DYNASTY
Li Chengqian 李承乾 619–645; Prince Min of Hengshan 恆山愍王	Li Tai 李泰 618–652; Prince Gong of Pu 濮恭王	Li Zhi 李治 628–683; Gaozong 高宗; 649–683	Wu Zhao 武曌 624–705; Wu Zetian 武則天; 690–705
1	4	5 (1)	7 (3)	8 (4)
Li Zhong 李忠 643–665; Prince of Yan 燕王	Li Sujie 李素節 646–690; Prince of Xu 許王	Li Hong 李弘 652–675; Xiaojing 孝敬	Li Xian 李顯 656–710; Zhongzong 中宗; 684, 705–710	Li Dan 李旦 662–716; Ruizong 睿宗; 684–690, 710–712
4
Li Chongmao 李重茂 695/698–714; Shangdi 殤帝; 710
1	3
Li Chengqi 李成器 679–742; Rangdi 讓帝	Li Longji 李隆基 685–762; Xuanzong I 玄宗; 712–756
1	2	3	16
Li Cong 李琮 d. 752; Fengtian 奉天	Li Ying 李瑛 d. 737; Crown Prince	Li Heng 李亨 711–762; Suzong 肅宗; 756–762	Li Lin 李璘 d. 757; Prince of Yong 永王
1	3
Li Yu 李豫 727–779; Daizong 代宗; 762–779	Li Tan 李倓 d. 757; Chengtian 承天
1
Li Gua 李适 742–805; Dezong 德宗; 779–805
1
Li Song 李誦 761–806; Shunzong 順宗; 805
1
Li Chun 李純 778–820; Xianzong 憲宗; 805–820
1	3	13
Li Ning 李寧 793–812; Cr.Prince Huizhao 惠昭太子	Li Heng 李恆 795–824; Muzong 穆宗; 820–824	Li Chen 李忱 810–859; Xuānzong 宣宗; 846–859
1	2	5	1
Li Zhan 李湛 809–827; Jingzong 敬宗; 824–827	Li Ang 李昂 809–840; Wenzong 文宗; 827–840	Li Yang 李炎 814–846; Wuzong 武宗; 840–846	Li Cui 李漼 833–873; Yizong 懿宗; 859–873
5	7
Li Xuan 李儇 862–888; Xizong 僖宗; 873–888	Li Yue 李曄 867–904; Zhaozong 昭宗; 888–904
9
Li Zhu 李柷 892–908; Aidi 哀帝 or Zhaoxuan 昭宣; 904–907

== See also ==
- Tang dynasty
- List of emperors of the Tang dynasty
- Li (surname 李)
