= Xianzhi =

Xiongnu tribe mentioned in the Book of Jin

The Xianzhi (Old Chinese: 鮮支 (xiānzhī)), was one of the Xiongnu tribes.

== Etymology ==
Xianzhi means Gardenia in Chinese.

== History ==
The Xianzhi were one of the 19 Xiongnu tribes recorded in the Book of Jin. There is limited information about the Xianzhi tribe. According to the Book of Jin, in 417 AD, the Western Liang ruler Li Xin defeated Juqu Mengxun at the Xianzhi creek. Dai the Elder's ritual records state that the Xianzhi, the Qosuo, the Di, and the Qiang were pacified by Emperor Shun in the West. And the same sentence is cited as the pacified tribes in Shiji, "the Western Rong, the Xizhi (析枝), the Qusou, the Di, and the Qiang". Based on this, it is possible to say that it is mentioned as Xianzhi in the Jin book and the Book of Rites, but as Xizhi in Shiji.
