= Li Jingshou =

5th-century Chinese princess

Li Jingshou (Chinese: 李敬受) (died 437?) was a princess of the Lushuihu-led Northern Liang dynasty of China. Her husband was Juqu Mujian (Prince Ai).

Li Jingshou was the daughter of the Western Liang prince Li Gao and Lady Yin, who was later princess dowager when Li Jingshou's brother Li Xin became prince in 417. When he was subsequently defeated and killed in 420 by the Northern Liang prince Juqu Mengxun, the Western Liang capital Jiuquan (酒泉, in modern Jiuquan, Gansu) fell to Northern Liang, and Princess Dowager Yin and Li Jingshou were captured. However, because Juqu Mengxun admired Princess Dowager Yin's courage (in refusing to plead for her life), he treated her with respect, and married Li Jingshou to his son Juqu Mujian.

In 433, with Juqu Mengxun extremely ill, the Northern Liang nobles, believing Juqu Mengxun's younger brother Juqu Puti (沮渠菩提), whom Juqu Mengxun had designed heir apparent, to be too young to govern, deposed Juqu Puti and made Juqu Mujian heir apparent instead. Apparently, after Juqu Mengxun soon died and was succeeded by Juqu Mujian, Li Jingshou was created princess. However, in 437, Emperor Taiwu of Northern Wei, to whose state Northern Liang submitted as a vassal, wanted to marry his sister Princess Wuwei to Juqu Mujian. Juqu Mujian was therefore forced to divorce Princess Li, and she and her mother Princess Dowager Yin were relocated from the Northern Liang capital Guzang (姑臧, in modern Wuwei, Gansu) to Jiuquan. Princess Li soon died.

Chinese royalty
Preceded by Princess Meng	Princess of Northern Liang; 433?–437	Succeeded by Princess Tuoba
