= Consort Dugu =

Consort Dugu may refer to:

- Dugu sisters
  - Empress Mingjing (died 558), Emperor Ming of Northern Zhou's wife
  - Duchess Dugu (died 580s or later), Li Bing's wife
  - Dugu Qieluo (544–602), Emperor Wen of Sui's wife
- Consort Dugu (Tang dynasty) (died 775), Emperor Daizong of Tang's concubine

== See also ==
- Queen Dugu (TV series), based on Dugu Qieluo's life
