= Li Xun (Western Liang) =

Li Xun 李恂

Ruler of Western Liang
- Reign: 420–421
- Predecessor: Li Xin
- Born: Unknown
- Died: 421
Full name
- Family name: Lǐ (李); Given name: Xún (恂)
Era name and dates
- Yǒngjiàn (永建): 420–421
Regnal name
- Champion General, Inspector of Liang Province (冠軍將軍 涼州刺史)
- House: Li
- Dynasty: Western Liang
- Father: Li Gao

Li Xun (Note: In this Chinese name, the family name is Li.) (Chinese: 李恂; died 421), courtesy name Shiru (士如), was the third and last ruler of China's Western Liang dynasty during the Sixteen Kingdoms period. Li Xun tried to hold out against the conquering Northern Liang armies under its prince Juqu Mengxun, after his brother Li Xin's death in 420. He was only able to hold the city of Dunhuang for several months, before Juqu Mengxun successfully sieged the city, and Li Xun committed suicide, which marked the collapse of the Western Liang dynasty.

== Brief reign ==
Very little is known about Li Xun's life, including whether he was the son of his brother Li Xin's mother Princess Dowager Yin. Under his father Li Gao (Prince Wuzhao) and/or Li Xin, Li Xun successively served as the governor of Jiuquan (酒泉, roughly modern Jiuquan, Gansu) and Dunhuang Commanderies. His rule of Dunhuang was said to be benevolent and favored by the people. In 420, while trying to attack Northern Liang, Li Xin fell into a trap set by Juqu Mengxun and was killed in battle. Juqu Mengxun then quickly reached the Western Liang capital Jiuquan, and Li Xin's other brothers abandoned Jiuquan and fled to Dunhuang. Once they reached Dunhuang, they and Li Xun, then the governor of Dunhuang, abandoned Dunhuang and fled to the hills north of Dunhuang.

Juqu Mengxun commissioned Suo Yuanxu (索元緒) to be the governor of Dunhuang. However, Suo quickly lost favor with the people by being rude, dishonest, and cruel. Some people of Dunhuang, under the leadership of Song Cheng (宋承) and Zhang Hong (張弘), secretly invited Li Xun back to Dunhuang, and in winter 420 he did so, forcing Suo to flee. Song and Zhang offered Li Xun the titles of Champion General (冠軍將軍) and Inspector of Liang Province (涼州刺史), and he changed the era name to signify that Western Liang was still a state. Juqu Mengxun then sent his heir apparent Juqu Zhengde (沮渠政德) to attack Dunhuang, and Li Xun defended the city, refusing to engage Juqu Zhengde.

However, Juqu Mengxun soon arrived, and he built levees to accumulate water around Dunhuang. Li Xun offered to surrender, but Juqu Mengxun refused. At this point, Song Cheng betrayed him and offered the city to Juqu Mengxun. Upon hearing this, Li Xun committed suicide, and Juqu Mengxun slaughtered the city. Western Liang was at its end.

== Notes ==
Lord of (Western) Liang House of Li Died: 421
Chinese nobility
Preceded by Li Xin	Duke of Western Liang; 420–421	Extinct
Preceded by Li Xin	Duke of Jiuquan; 420–421	Forfeit Title next held by Helian Lun
Titles in pretence
Preceded by Li Xin	— TITULAR — Emperor of China; 420–421; Reason for succession failure: Annexed by Northern Liang	Succeeded by Juqu Mengxun
