= Empress Yuanzhen =

Empress Yuanzhen (Chinese: 元貞皇后) may refer to:

- Duchess Dugu (fl. 6th century), posthumously honored as an empress by her son Li Yuan, the first emperor of the Tang dynasty
- Lady Zhang (Zhu Quanzhong's wife) (died 904), posthumously honored as an empress by her son Zhu Youzhen, the last emperor of Later Liang
