= Yongjian =

Yongjian (永建) may refer to:

- Yongjian, Yunnan, a town in Weishan Yi and Hui Autonomous County, Yunnan, China
- Yongjian (126–132), the era name used by Emperor Shun of Han
- Yongjian (420–421), the era name used by Li Xun, ruler of Western Liang
