= Jinta =

Jinta may refer to:

- Jinta County, county in Jiuquan, Gansu, China
- Phanuwat Jinta (born 1987), Thai footballer
- The name Jinta means "a false friend"
