= Princess Dowager Yin =

Princess Dowager Yin (尹太后, personal name unknown) was a princess dowager of the Chinese state Western Liáng. She was the mother of its second duke, Li Xin and the second wife of its founder Li Gao (Prince Wuzhao), who was posthumously honored by Li Xin as a prince, and therefore Lady Yin was honored as a princess dowager even though her husband never carried the princely title while alive.

== Background ==
The family of future Princess Dowager Yin was originally from Tianshui. She was said to be studious, capable of speaking, ambitious, and virtuous in her young age. She initially married one Ma Yuanzheng (馬元正), whose family was from Fufeng (扶風, roughly modern Xianyang, Shaanxi). (It was likely, though, by the time that she married Ma, both of their families had settled in the Hexi Corridor.) After Ma died, she married Li Gao as his second wife, and it was said that because this was her second marriage, she spent three years not speaking. She raised his first wife's children as if they were her own, and it was said that she had much contributions in Li Gao's career and founding of Western Liang in 400. Therefore, a common saying at the time was, "Li and Yin rule Dunhuang." However, there is no historical record as to whether she carried any titles during Li Gao's reign.

== As princess dowager ==
After her husband died in 417, Lady Yin was honored as princess dowager. She was described as wise and full of composure, and she tried in vain to stop her son Li Xin from attacking rival Northern Liang in 420—an attack that was induced by a trap set by Northern Liang's prince Juqu Mengxun. She pointed out that a small country such as theirs should first strive to become strong and they would not be able to defeat as strong a state as that of Juqu Mengxun.

Li Xin was defeated and killed by Juqu Mengxun, and Western Liang's capital Jiuquan (酒泉, in modern Jiuquan, Gansu) fell. Princess Dowager Yin was captured, but she maintained her dignity and did not plead with Juqu Mengxun for her life or mourn her son's death. Juqu Mengxun praised her and had his son Juqu Mujian marry her daughter Li Jingshou.

After Juqu Mujian succeeded Juqu Mengxun in 433, Lady Li became princess, but in 437, Juqu Mujian was forced to divorce her and marry Northern Wei's Princess Wuwei, sister to Northern Wei's Emperor Taiwu. Princess Li died soon thereafter, and after Princess Li's death, Princess Dowager Yin had been sent to live in Jiuquan. Before the commander of the garrison there, she feigned disinterest in going to Yiwu (伊吾, in modern Hami Prefecture, Xinjiang), where some of her grandsons had fled. When the guard around her relaxed, she secretly fled and she lived out her years in Yiwu, dying at the age of 74.
