= Jinta County =

Jinta County 金塔县
- County
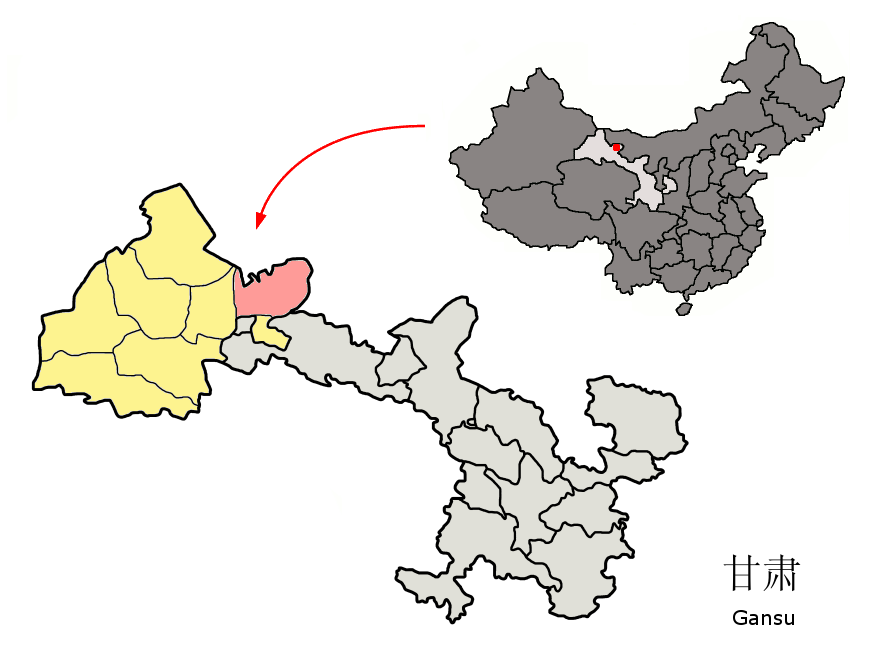
- Jinta (pink) within Jiuquan prefecture (yellow) within Gansu (grey)
- Coordinates (Jinta government): 39°59′03″N 98°54′06″E
- Country: China
- Province: Gansu
- Prefecture-level city: Jiuquan
- County seat: Jinta Town

Area
  - Total: 18,800 km^{2} (7,300 sq mi)

Population (2017)
  - Total: 145,600
  - Density: 7.74/km^{2} (20.1/sq mi)
- Time zone: UTC+8 (China Standard)
- Postal code: 735300

Jinta County (Chinese: 金塔县; pinyin: Jīntǎ Xiàn) is a county in the northwest of Gansu province, China, bordering Inner Mongolia to the north and east. It is under the jurisdiction of the prefecture-level city of Jiuquan. Its postal code is 735300, and in 1999 its population was 137,816 people.

== Administrative divisions ==
Jinta County is divided to 7 towns, 2 townships and 2 others.

Towns

- Zhongdong (中东镇)
- Dingxin (鼎新镇)
- Jinta (金塔镇)
- Dongba (东坝镇)
- Hangtian (航天镇)
- Dazhuangzi (大庄子镇)
- Xiba (西坝镇)

Townships

- Gucheng Township (古城乡)
- Yangjingziwan Township (羊井子湾乡)

Others

- Gansu Yasheng Agriculture and Industry Group Co., Ltd. (甘肃亚盛农工商集团有限责任公司)
- Industrial Park Management Committee (工业园区管委会)

== Climate ==
Climate data for Jinta, elevation 1,271 m (4,170 ft), (1991–2020 normals, extremes 1991–present)
Month	Jan	Feb	Mar	Apr	May	Jun	Jul	Aug	Sep	Oct	Nov	Dec	Year
Record high °C (°F)	16.0 (60.8)	17.3 (63.1)	26.4 (79.5)	34.2 (93.6)	36.6 (97.9)	38.1 (100.6)	40.5 (104.9)	39.5 (103.1)	35.2 (95.4)	29.3 (84.7)	20.1 (68.2)	11.9 (53.4)	40.5 (104.9)
Mean daily maximum °C (°F)	−1.7 (28.9)	4.2 (39.6)	11.9 (53.4)	20.1 (68.2)	25.6 (78.1)	30.2 (86.4)	32.2 (90.0)	30.6 (87.1)	25.2 (77.4)	17.5 (63.5)	8.1 (46.6)	−0.4 (31.3)	17.0 (62.5)
Daily mean °C (°F)	−9.0 (15.8)	−3.7 (25.3)	3.8 (38.8)	12.0 (53.6)	17.9 (64.2)	22.8 (73.0)	24.8 (76.6)	22.8 (73.0)	16.6 (61.9)	8.5 (47.3)	0.4 (32.7)	−7.2 (19.0)	9.1 (48.4)
Mean daily minimum °C (°F)	−14.8 (5.4)	−10.2 (13.6)	−3.1 (26.4)	4.0 (39.2)	9.5 (49.1)	14.6 (58.3)	17.0 (62.6)	15.0 (59.0)	9.1 (48.4)	1.3 (34.3)	−5.4 (22.3)	−12.5 (9.5)	2.0 (35.7)
Record low °C (°F)	−29.6 (−21.3)	−27.2 (−17.0)	−20.8 (−5.4)	−8.6 (16.5)	−1.1 (30.0)	6.2 (43.2)	9.6 (49.3)	5.7 (42.3)	−2.2 (28.0)	−11.0 (12.2)	−19.5 (−3.1)	−29.6 (−21.3)	−29.6 (−21.3)
Average precipitation mm (inches)	1.6 (0.06)	1.1 (0.04)	3.4 (0.13)	3.3 (0.13)	4.8 (0.19)	9.0 (0.35)	17.8 (0.70)	15.6 (0.61)	8.4 (0.33)	2.3 (0.09)	1.5 (0.06)	1.5 (0.06)	70.3 (2.75)
Average precipitation days (≥ 0.1 mm)	2.1	1.2	1.9	1.9	2.8	4.2	6.0	5.4	2.8	1.1	1.1	2.1	32.6
Average snowy days	3.3	1.8	2.1	0.8	0.1	0	0	0	0	0.4	1.9	3.3	13.7
Average relative humidity (%)	55	43	37	30	32	39	45	46	47	44	49	57	44
Mean monthly sunshine hours	234.3	233.5	272.9	292.5	326.2	318.0	316.4	302.5	283.9	283.0	239.5	225.6	3,328.3
Percentage possible sunshine	78	76	73	73	73	71	70	72	77	84	81	78	76
Source: China Meteorological Administration

Climate data for Dingxin Town, Jinta, elevation 1,177 m (3,862 ft), (1991–2020 normals)
Month	Jan	Feb	Mar	Apr	May	Jun	Jul	Aug	Sep	Oct	Nov	Dec	Year
Mean daily maximum °C (°F)	−1.3 (29.7)	4.4 (39.9)	12.1 (53.8)	20.3 (68.5)	26.0 (78.8)	30.6 (87.1)	32.4 (90.3)	30.6 (87.1)	25.5 (77.9)	17.9 (64.2)	8.2 (46.8)	0.0 (32.0)	17.2 (63.0)
Daily mean °C (°F)	−9.1 (15.6)	−4.1 (24.6)	3.4 (38.1)	11.9 (53.4)	18.1 (64.6)	23.1 (73.6)	24.9 (76.8)	22.7 (72.9)	16.7 (62.1)	8.6 (47.5)	0.3 (32.5)	−7.2 (19.0)	9.1 (48.4)
Mean daily minimum °C (°F)	−15.5 (4.1)	−11.3 (11.7)	−3.8 (25.2)	4.1 (39.4)	9.9 (49.8)	15.0 (59.0)	17.4 (63.3)	15.5 (59.9)	9.5 (49.1)	1.2 (34.2)	−5.9 (21.4)	−13.1 (8.4)	1.9 (35.5)
Average precipitation mm (inches)	0.8 (0.03)	0.5 (0.02)	2.3 (0.09)	1.7 (0.07)	4.0 (0.16)	9.5 (0.37)	15.9 (0.63)	15.6 (0.61)	7.6 (0.30)	1.7 (0.07)	0.7 (0.03)	1.0 (0.04)	61.3 (2.42)
Average precipitation days (≥ 0.1 mm)	1.3	0.7	1.7	1.4	2.7	4.4	6.2	5.1	2.7	0.9	0.8	1.4	29.3
Average snowy days	2.6	1.4	1.9	0.8	0	0	0	0	0	0.4	1.5	2.7	11.3
Average relative humidity (%)	52	42	37	32	31	39	45	47	45	42	49	54	43
Mean monthly sunshine hours	231.8	232.8	273.3	289.6	326.2	316.8	315.7	303.6	281.6	281.5	236.6	223.3	3,312.8
Percentage possible sunshine	77	76	73	72	73	71	70	72	77	83	81	78	75
Source: China Meteorological Administration

== See also ==
- List of administrative divisions of Gansu
