= Yumen City =

Yumen 玉门市
- County-level city
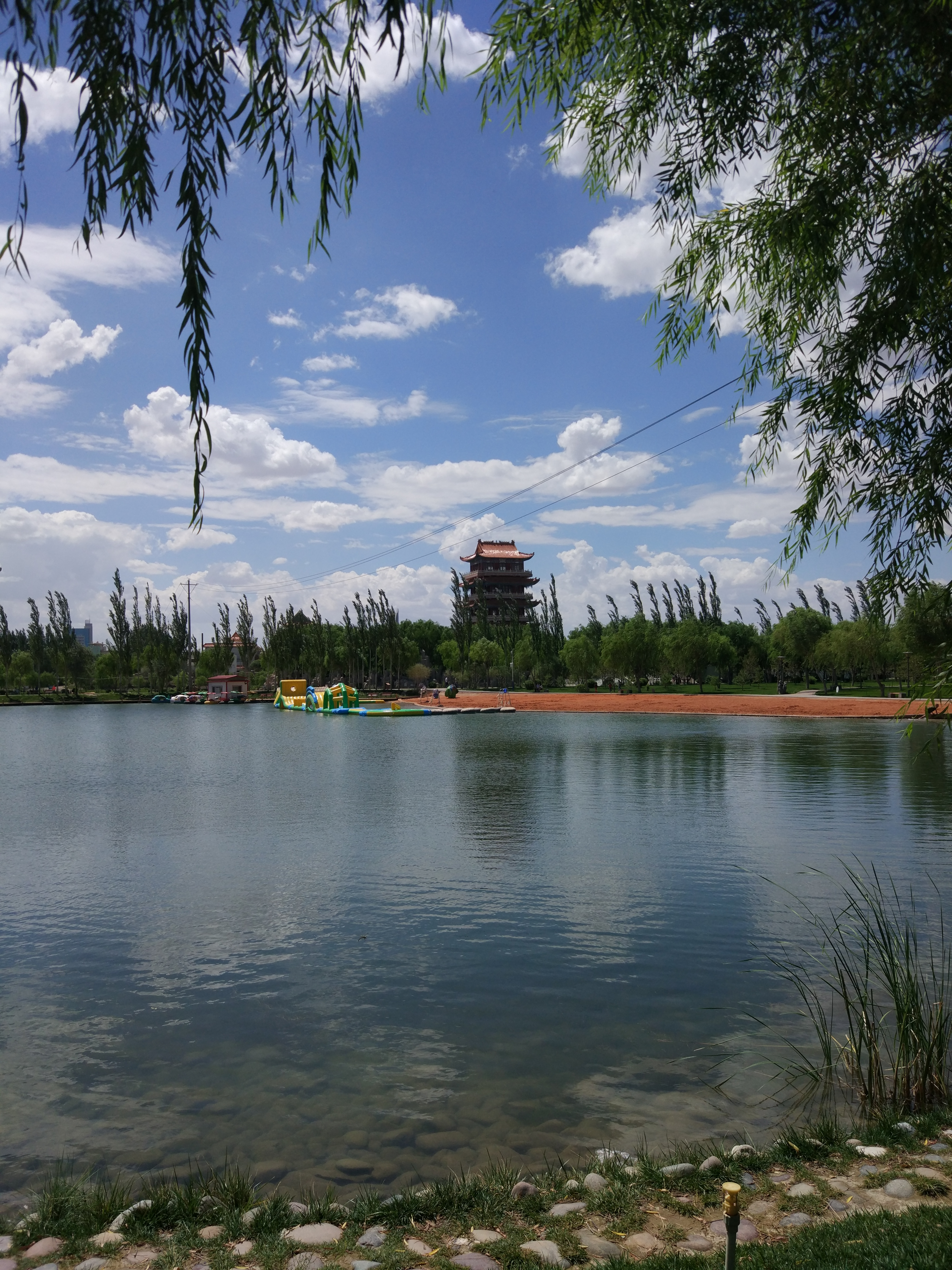
- Yuzehu Park, Yumen, Gansu Province

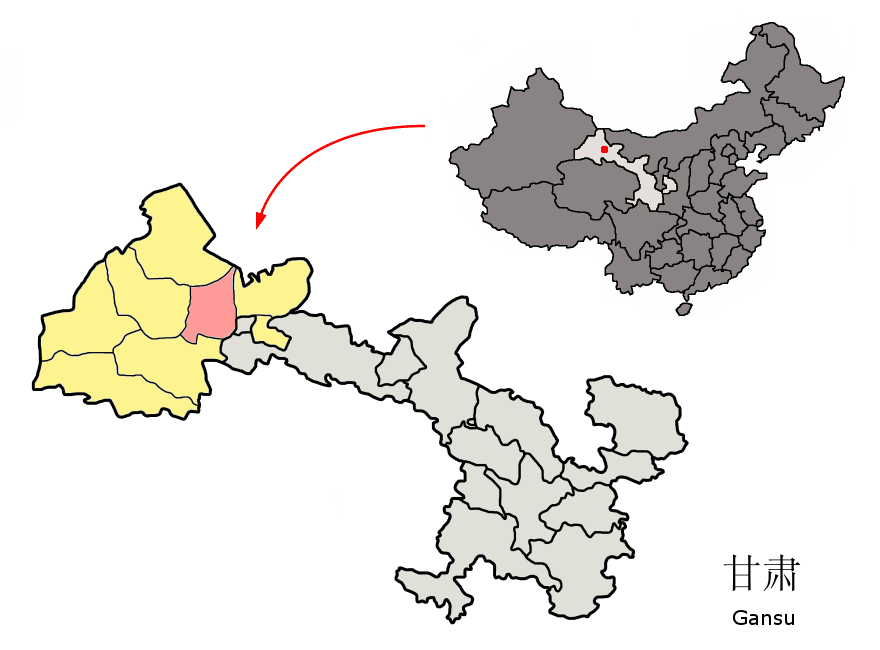
- Location of Yumen City (pink) within Jiuquan City (yellow) and Gansu

- Location of the city centre in Gansu Yumen (China)
- Coordinates: 39°50′N 97°34′E
- Country: China
- Province: Gansu
- Prefecture-level city: Jiuquan
- Municipal seat: Yumen Town

Area
  - Total: 13,500 km^{2} (5,200 sq mi)
- Elevation: 1,507 m (4,944 ft)

Population (2020)
  - Total: 137,736
  - Density: 10.2/km^{2} (26.4/sq mi)
- Time zone: UTC+8 (China Standard)
- Postal code: 735211
- Area code: 0937
- Website: www.yumen.gov.cn

Yumen (simplified Chinese: 玉门; traditional Chinese: 玉門; pinyin: Yùmén, literally, "Jade Gate") is a city in western Gansu province, China. It is a county-level city with a population of 106,812 (2002 est.), and is part of Jiuquan "prefecture-level city" (a multi-county administrative unit). It is located on the Silk Road and is best known for its oil production.

The city's name is often confused with the Yumen Guan or Jade Gate which is the frontier-pass of ancient times, the entrance to the old Silk Roads, which was situated not far to the west of Dunhuang. Although both Yumen City and Yumen Gate are within Jiuquan, the latter is some 400 kilometres (250 mi) to the west from the former.

== History ==
The site of Yumen was brought under Chinese control around the end of the 2nd century BCE. Yumen was known as 'Huiji' in the 5th century when the area was reclaimed by the Northern Wei dynasty (386–534/535) and was soon after renamed back to Yumen in 581. Under the Tang dynasty (618–907), Yumen's county seat was located at Chijinzhen which is east of the present Yumen City. The city was then under Tibetan control around 770 CE for some 70 years. After the Tang dynasty, Yumen became a part of the Western Xia (1038–1227). During the Ming dynasty (1368–1644), the area came under Tibetan control again and was only reestablished later on in the early Qing dynasty (1644–1912).

In 1939, the first oilfield in China was established at Yumen.

In 2003, with the approval of the State Council, the Yumen Municipal Government moved from the old urban area (now Laojunmiao Town), which was dominated by the oil industry, to Yumen Town, which was mainly based on agriculture. The population of the old town has since dropped from 135,000 at its peak to 15,000.

In 2014, areas of the city were sealed off after a resident died of the bubonic plague. Districts of the city which house up to 100,000 were turned into quarantine zones. The city allocated 1 million yuan to be used for emergency vaccinations.

== Administrative divisions ==
Yumen City is divided to 1 subdistrict, 10 towns, 2 ethnic townships and 5 others.

Subdistricts

- Xinshiqu Subdistrict (新市区街道)

Towns

- Yumen (玉门镇)
- Chijin (赤金镇)
- Huahai (花海镇)
- Laojunmiao (老君庙镇)
- Huangzhawan (黄闸湾镇)
- Xiaxihao (下西号镇)
- Liuhe, Gansu (柳河镇)
- Changma, Gansu (昌马镇)
- Liuhu (柳湖镇)
- Liudun (六墩镇)

Ethnic townships

- Xiaojinwan Dongxiang (小金湾东乡族乡)
- Dushanzi Dongxiang (独山子东乡族乡)

Others

- State-owned Horse Drinking Farm (国营饮马农场)
- State-owned Yellow Flower Farm Dongxiangzu Township (国营黄花农场)
- Gansu Nongken Yusheng Agricultural Company (甘肃农垦裕盛农业公司)
- Gansu Provincial Agricultural Reclamation Construction Engineering Company (甘肃省农垦建筑工程公司)
- Gansu mining area (甘肃矿区)

== Economy ==
The overland route to Western Asia from China flourished until the end of the Tang dynasty. Furthermore, due to increased use of sea transportation, Yumen became a backwater.

There were two catalysts for Yumen's rapid revival in the 1930s and 40s. The construction of a modern highway over the old caravan route from Yumen to Ürümqi (capital of the Uygur Autonomous Region of Xinjiang) and continuing on-wards to Kazakhstan. The railway of Yumen is the linking point of the railway line between Lanzhou (capital of Gansu) and Ürümqi.

After the discovery of oil in the Jiuquan basin, to the north of the Qilian Mountains the city's economy was given another major push. The first oil was drilled at Laojunmiao near Yumen in 1939 where an appreciable production was achieved in 1941. Only until 1949 did large-scale development begin, and prospecting in 1950 revealed much larger reserves than had been speculated. Yumen has its own refinery but is also linked by pipeline to a refinery at Lanzhou. Other than oil drilling and refining, Yumen also has thermal and wind power-generating facilities. Manufacturing includes machinery, building materials, chemical fertilizers and process agricultural products.

China appears to be constructing 120 missile silos near Yumen.

== Geography and climate ==
Yumen has a cold desert climate (Köppen BWk), with an annual total precipitation of 67 millimetres (2.64 in), the majority of which occurs in summer. Winters are long and cold, with a 24-hour average temperature of −9.8 °C (14.4 °F) in January, while summers are very warm, with a July average of 21.7 °C (71.1 °F); the annual mean is 7.13 °C (44.8 °F). The diurnal temperature variation reaches or exceeds 15 °C (27 °F) for much of the year. With monthly percent possible sunshine ranging from 67% in March to 80% in October, the city receives 3,214 hours of bright sunshine annually.

Climate data for Yumen, elevation 1,526 m (5,007 ft), (1991–2020 normals, extremes 1991–present)
| Month | Jan | Feb | Mar | Apr | May | Jun | Jul | Aug | Sep | Oct | Nov | Dec | Year |
|---|---|---|---|---|---|---|---|---|---|---|---|---|---|
| Record high °C (°F) | 15.2 (59.4) | 16.3 (61.3) | 24.2 (75.6) | 32.2 (90.0) | 34.2 (93.6) | 35.2 (95.4) | 38.0 (100.4) | 37.0 (98.6) | 32.7 (90.9) | 27.1 (80.8) | 18.3 (64.9) | 10.6 (51.1) | 38.0 (100.4) |
| Mean daily maximum °C (°F) | −2.8 (27.0) | 2.9 (37.2) | 10.4 (50.7) | 18.4 (65.1) | 23.7 (74.7) | 28.0 (82.4) | 29.9 (85.8) | 28.7 (83.7) | 23.5 (74.3) | 15.9 (60.6) | 6.7 (44.1) | −1.4 (29.5) | 15.3 (59.6) |
| Daily mean °C (°F) | −9.9 (14.2) | −4.9 (23.2) | 2.4 (36.3) | 10.4 (50.7) | 16.2 (61.2) | 20.9 (69.6) | 22.7 (72.9) | 21.0 (69.8) | 15.0 (59.0) | 7.5 (45.5) | −0.5 (31.1) | −7.9 (17.8) | 7.7 (45.9) |
| Mean daily minimum °C (°F) | −15.4 (4.3) | −11.2 (11.8) | −4.3 (24.3) | 2.8 (37.0) | 8.1 (46.6) | 12.9 (55.2) | 14.8 (58.6) | 13.1 (55.6) | 7.7 (45.9) | 0.9 (33.6) | −5.9 (21.4) | −13.0 (8.6) | 0.9 (33.6) |
| Record low °C (°F) | −29.0 (−20.2) | −27.5 (−17.5) | −23.5 (−10.3) | −11.5 (11.3) | −2.4 (27.7) | 3.9 (39.0) | 7.4 (45.3) | 3.4 (38.1) | −5.8 (21.6) | −10.9 (12.4) | −22.3 (−8.1) | −35.1 (−31.2) | −35.1 (−31.2) |
| Average precipitation mm (inches) | 1.6 (0.06) | 1.6 (0.06) | 5.1 (0.20) | 4.4 (0.17) | 8.8 (0.35) | 14.9 (0.59) | 13.2 (0.52) | 12.1 (0.48) | 7.7 (0.30) | 2.2 (0.09) | 2.2 (0.09) | 2.6 (0.10) | 76.4 (3.01) |
| Average precipitation days (≥ 0.1 mm) | 2.6 | 1.4 | 2.4 | 2.3 | 3.5 | 4.4 | 5.9 | 4.6 | 2.3 | 1.3 | 1.7 | 3.4 | 35.8 |
| Average snowy days | 5.1 | 2.7 | 3.1 | 1.3 | 0.2 | 0 | 0 | 0 | 0.1 | 0.8 | 2.6 | 5.7 | 21.6 |
| Average relative humidity (%) | 56 | 42 | 35 | 30 | 31 | 39 | 46 | 45 | 44 | 40 | 47 | 57 | 43 |
| Mean monthly sunshine hours | 215.6 | 211.7 | 253.2 | 277.7 | 311.5 | 308.1 | 306.1 | 299.5 | 281.8 | 273.9 | 223.7 | 210.7 | 3,173.5 |
| Percentage possible sunshine | 72 | 69 | 68 | 69 | 69 | 69 | 68 | 71 | 77 | 81 | 76 | 73 | 72 |
Source: China Meteorological Administration
