= Li Bing (Northern Zhou) =

Chinese politician of the Northern Zhou dynasty (died 572)

Duke of Tang (唐國公)
- Tenure: September 564 – 572
- Predecessor: Title created
- Successor: Li Yuan
- Born: Li Bing (李昞); 512; Northern Zhou
- Died: 572; Northern Zhou
- Consorts: Lady Dugu
- Issue: Li Yuan, Emperor Gaozu of Tang: Princess Ton'an; Li Cheng; Li Zhan; Li Hong; Lady Li
Posthumous name
- After 572; Benevolent Duke of Tang (唐仁公): After 18 June 618; Emperor Yuan (元皇帝)
- House: House of Li
- Father: Li Hu
- Mother: Lady Liang
- Occupation: Politician

Li Bing (李昞; d. 572), Xianbei name Daye Bing (大野昞), was a Chinese politician of the Northern Zhou dynasty, during the Northern and Southern dynasties period. He was the father of Gaozu, the founding emperor of the Tang dynasty.

His father, Li Hu, served as a major general under the Western Wei general Yuwen Tai, and was created the Duke of Longxi in 554; Li Bing eventually inherited his father's title, and became the Duke of Tang (唐國公) in 22 September 564. He was appointed zhuguo on 27 June 571. His posthumous title was the Benevolent Duke of Tang (唐仁公).

After his son became emperor, he was granted the posthumous name of Yuan (元皇帝) on 19 July 618, while his temple name was Shizu (世祖).

== Family ==
Parents

- Father: Li Hu (李虎)
- Mother: Lady Liang (梁氏), posthumous name Empress Jinglie (景烈皇后)

Wife(s) and issue:

- Empress Yuanzhen, of the Dugu clan of Henan (元贞皇后 独孤氏), daughter of Dugu Xin
  - Li Cheng, Prince of Liang (梁王 李澄), 1st son
  - Li Zhan, Prince of Shu (蜀王 李湛), 2nd son
  - Li Hong, Prince of Zheng (鄭王 李洪), 3rd son
  - Li Yuan, Emperor Gaozu (唐高祖李淵; April 566 – 25 June 635), 4th son
  - Princess Tong'an (同安公主), 1st daughter
    - Married Wang Yu (王裕), and had issue (one son and one daughter)
- Unknown:
  - Lady Li (李氏), 2nd daughter
    - Married Lu Yu (鹿裕)
