= Dugu sisters =

Part-Xianbei, part-Han Chinese sisters of the Dugu clan

The Dugu sisters were part-Xianbei, part-Han sisters of the Dugu clan who lived in the Western Wei (535–557), Northern Zhou (557–581) and Sui (581–618) dynasties of China. All were daughters of the Western Wei general Dugu Xin. The eldest sister became a Northern Zhou empress, the seventh sister became a Sui dynasty empress, and the fourth sister was posthumously honored as empress of the Tang dynasty (618–907). The seventh sister Dugu Qieluo, in particular, was one of the most influential women in ancient Chinese history, owing to her closeness to her husband Emperor Wen of Sui, throughout their 45-year monogamous marriage. Some authors have written that the three sisters "married emperors" or "married into imperial families". However, at the time of their marriages, none of their husbands were members of an imperial family (yet): each of the three sisters became an empress or a posthumous empress after a dynastic change. Out of the three dynastic transitions, only the first — the usurpation of the Western Wei throne by the Yuwens — is considered a long time coming, in which the Dugus played no role. In both Yang Jian's and Li Yuan's (Emperor Gaozu of Tang) rise to power, family ties to the ruling house (through the sisters and Dugu Qieluo's daughter Yang Lihua) were important.

== Family tree ==
- – Dugu sisters
- – Western Wei (535–557) emperors
- – Northern Zhou (557–581) emperors
- – Western Liang (555–587) emperors
- – Sui dynasty (581–618) emperors
- – Tang dynasty (618–907) emperors

Family of Dugu sisters

Yuan Baoju	Yuwen Tai	Dugu Xin
Yuan Kuo	Yuan Qin	Empress Yuwen	Yuwen Yong	Yuwen Yu	1. Empress Dugu	7. Empress Dugu	Yang Jian	Dugu Luo
Empress Yuan	Yuwen Jue	Princess Xiangyang	Li Bing	4. Duchess Dugu	Xiao Kui
Yuwen Yun	Duchess Dou	Li Yuan	Empress Yang	Yang Guang	Empress Xiao	Xiao Cong	Xiao Yu	Duchess Dugu

== Basic information ==
Sister	Personal name	Mother	Husband	Posthumous name	Birth year	Death year	Issue
1st	Unknown	Lady Guo (郭氏)	Yuwen Yu (宇文毓)	Empress Mingjing (明敬皇后)	Unknown	558	1
4th	Unknown	Unknown	Li Bing (李昞)	Empress Yuanzhen (元貞皇后)	Unknown	Unknown	2
7th	Dugu Qieluo	Lady Cui (崔氏)	Yang Jian (楊堅)	Empress Wenxian (文獻皇后)	544	602	10

== See also ==
- Two Qiaos
- Soong sisters
