= Dugu Xin =

Chinese general (503–557)

- 獨孤信
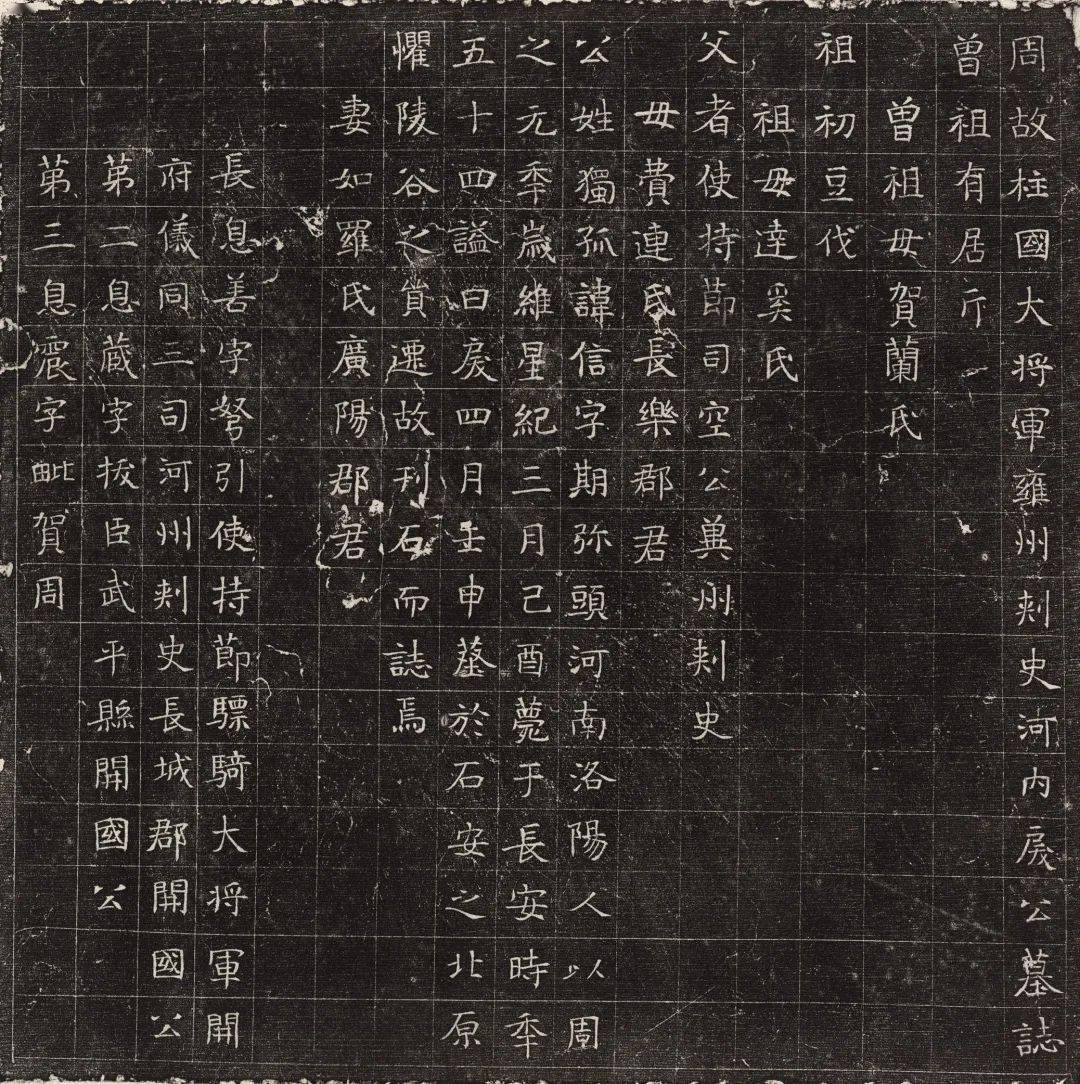
- Epitaph of Dugu Xin
- Born: 503; Luoyang, Northern Wei
- Died: 24 April 557 (aged 53–54); Chang'an, Northern Zhou
- Cause of death: Forced suicide
- Spouses: Lady Ruluo; Lady Guo; Lady Cui
- Children: Dugu Luo; Dugu Shan; Dugu Mu; Empress Mingjing; Empress Yuanzhen; Dugu Cang; Dugu Shun; Empress Wenxian; Dugu Tuo; Dugu Zong; Dugu Zheng
- Parents: Dugu Kuzhe (father); Lady Feilian (mother)

Dugu Xin (Chinese: 獨孤信; 503 – 24 April 557), Xianbei name Qimitou (期彌頭), known as Dugu Ruyuan (獨孤如願) before 540, was a general and official during the chaotic Northern and Southern dynasties period of imperial China. In 534, Dugu Xin followed Emperor Xiaowu of Northern Wei to the west to join the warlord Yuwen Tai, and in the ensuing years led Western Wei forces against their nemesis, the Eastern Wei. Despite an early debacle (after which he fled to and stayed for three years in the southern Liang state before returning to the northwest), he captured the former Northern Wei capital Luoyang from Eastern Wei in 537. He became one of the Eight Pillars of the State (八柱國) in 548. When the Northern Zhou replaced Western Wei, Dugu Xin was created Duke of Wei (衛國公), but was soon forced to commit suicide by the powerful regent Yuwen Hu. He received the posthumous name Li (戾; lit. ''unrepentant'').

He is best remembered today due to his three daughters: it is because of their marriages that he was a father-in-law to two emperors from two Chinese dynasties (Emperor Ming of Northern Zhou and Emperor Wen of Sui), and maternal grandfather to two emperors from two dynasties (Emperor Yang of Sui and Emperor Gaozu of Tang), all after his death. In fact, every Chinese emperor for 3 centuries (from 604 to 907, with the exception of Wu Zetian and self-proclaimed rebels) was descended from him. During the Sui dynasty, Dugu Xin was honored as Duke Jing of Zhao (趙國景公) by Emperor Wen. In 583, Empress Wenxian built a temple dedicated to his memory in the capital Daxing, the remains of which were discovered in 1997 on the campus of Xi'an Jiaotong University. During the Tang dynasty, he was honored as Prince of Liang (梁王).

== Family ==
Parents

- Father: Dugu Kuzhe, Duke of Sikong (司空公 獨孤庫者)
- Mother: Lady of Changle Commandery, of the Feilian clan (長樂郡君 費連氏)

Consorts and issue

- Lady of Guangyang Commandery, of the Ruluo clan (廣陽郡君 如羅氏)
  - Dugu Luo, Duke Gong of Shu (蜀恭公 獨孤羅; 534 – 7 March 599), first son
- Lady, of the Guo clan of Taiyuan (太原郭氏)
  - Dugu Shan, Duke of Henei Commandery (河内郡公 獨孤善; 538–577), second son
  - Dugu Mu, Duke of Jinquan County (金泉縣公 獨孤穆), third son
  - Empress Mingjing (明敬皇后; ? – 14 May 558), first daughter
    - Married Yuwen Yu, Emperor Ming of Northern Zhou (北周明帝 宇文毓; 534 – 30 May 560), and had issue (one son)
  - Dugu Cang, Duke of Wuping County (武平縣公 獨孤藏; 544–578), fourth son
  - Dugu Shun, Duke Cheng of Wu (武成公 獨孤順), fifth son
  - Dugu Tuo, Duke of Wuxi County (武喜縣公 獨孤陀), sixth son
  - Dugu Zheng, Marquis of Ping Township (平鄉侯 獨孤整), eighth son
- Madame of Ji, of the Cui clan of Qinghe (紀國夫人 清河崔氏)
  - Empress Wenxian (文獻皇后; 544 – 10 September 602), personal name Qieluo (伽羅), seventh daughter
    - Married Yang Jian, Emperor Wen of Sui (隋文帝 楊堅; 21 July 541 – 13 August 604), and had issue (five sons and five daughters)
- Unknown
  - Dugu Zong (獨孤宗), seventh son
  - Lady Dugu (獨孤氏), second daughter
  - Lady Dugu (獨孤氏), third daughter
  - Empress Yuanzhen (元貞皇后), fourth daughter
    - Married Li Bing, Duke of Tang (唐國公 李昞), and had issue (four sons and one daughter)
  - Lady Dugu (獨孤氏), fifth daughter
  - Lady Dugu (獨孤氏), sixth daughter

== Notes and references ==
- Li Dashi; Li Yanshou (659). Bei Shi (北史) [History of the Northern Dynasties] (in Chinese).
- Sima Guang (1086). Zizhi Tongjian (資治通鑑) [Comprehensive Mirror for Aid in Government] (in Chinese).
- Xu Song (1848). Tang Liang Jing Cheng Fang Kao (唐兩京城坊考) [A Survey of the Two Tang Dynasty Capitals] (in Chinese).
