= Duchess Dugu =

Northern Zhou noblewoman

- 獨孤氏
- Born: c. 536–544
- Died: bef. 618
- Title: Duchess of Longxi; Duchess of Tang; Dowager Duchess of Tang
- Spouse: Li Bing
- Children: Li Yuan (Emperor Gaozu); Princess Tong'an
- Parent: Dugu Xin (father)
- Relatives: Empress Dugu (sister)

Lady Dugu (Chinese: 獨孤氏, personal name unknown, fl.544 - 590s) was a duchess of the Northern Zhou dynasty. Her husband Li Bing was Duke of Longxi from 554 to 564 and Duke of Tang from 564 to 572. She was the fourth daughter of the Western Wei general Dugu Xin and one of the Dugu sisters.

She was given the posthumous name Empress Yuanzhen (元貞皇后) during the Tang dynasty, after her son Li Yuan ascended the throne.

== Life ==
She was born between 536 and 544, the years her eldest sister and the younger (seventh) sister Dugu Qieluo were born, respectively. When her husband Li Bing died in 572, their six-year-old son Li Yuan inherited his title of Duke of Tang.

Duchess Dowager Dugu suffered from poor health in her later life, and her daughter-in-law Duchess Dou assisted her in managing household affairs. According to official history, Dowager Dugu was once extremely sick and due to her reckless personality, several of her daughters-in-law refused to assist her (probably because their husbands were not her biological sons). Only Duchess Dou cared for her, and Dowager Dugu recovered after a month. Dowager Dugu was grateful and favored Duchess Dou.

She died before the Tang dynasty was founded in 618. Although Li Bing had many children, only Li Yuan and a daughter, known as Princess Tong'an (同安公主) during the Tang dynasty, were known to be born of Duchess Dugu.

According to Alphonse Mingana and Edward Harper Parker, Dugu might have been a "Nestorian" Christian.

== In popular culture ==
- Li Yixiao portrayed as Dugu Mantuo (独孤曼陀) in The Legend of Dugu 2017 Chinese television series.
