= Li Xin (Western Liang) =

Li Xin 李歆
- Duke of Liang

Ruler of Western Liang
- Reign: 417–420
- Predecessor: Li Gao
- Successor: Li Xun
- Died: 420
Full name
- Family name: Lǐ (李); Given name: Xīn (歆)
Era name and dates
- Jiāxīng (嘉興): 417–420
Regnal name
- 417–418: Grand Commander, Grand General, Duke of Liang, Governor of Liang Province, Colonel to Guard the Qiang people (大都督 大將軍 涼公 領涼州牧 護羌校尉); 418–420: Given tally, Commander in charge of military affairs in seven commanderies, Grand General to Pacify the West, Colonel to Guard the Qiang people, Duke of Jiuquan (持節 都督七郡諸軍事 鎮西大將軍 護羌校尉 酒泉公)
- House: Li
- Dynasty: Western Liang
- Father: Li Gao

Li Xin (Chinese: 李歆; died 420), courtesy name Shiye (士業), nickname Tongzhui (桐椎), was the second ruler of the Chinese Western Liang dynasty during the Sixteen Kingdoms period. The second, he succeeded his father Li Gao in 417 and aggressively tried to pursue campaigns against rival Northern Liang's prince Juqu Mengxun, but fell into a trap set by Juqu Mengxun in 420 and was killed in battle, bringing destruction to his state (although his brother Li Xun tried to hold out but was defeated soon as well).

== During Li Gao's reign ==
It is not known when Li Xin was born, or whether his mother Lady Yin was his father Li Gao's wife or concubine. He was Li Gao's second son, and so after Li Gao declared independence from Northern Liang and founded Western Liang in 400, it was not he, but his older brother Li Tan (李譚), who was created heir apparent. The first historical reference to him was in 404, when Li Tan died, and Li Gao created him heir apparent to replace Li Tan.

In 410, Li Xin fought a battle with the Northern Liang prince Juqu Mengxun when Juqu Mengxun attacked Western Liang, but was defeated by Juqu Mengxun, and his general Zhu Yuanhu (朱元虎) was captured, forcing Li Gao to use gold (2000 ounces) and silver (3000 catties) to ransom Zhu. In 411, he returned the favor, as after Juqu Mengxun made another attack on Western Liang but was forced to withdraw after his food supplies ran out, Li Xin attacked the Northern Liang army and dealt Juqu Mengxun a defeat, capturing Juqu Mengxun's general Juqu Bainian (沮渠百年).

In 417, Li Gao grew ill, and after entrusting Li Xin to his own half-brother Song Yao (宋繇) -- telling him that Li Xin was now his son—died. Li Xin succeeded him as duke, and Lady Yin was honored as lady dowager. (Note: Chinese: 太后, romanized: taihou, alternatively translated as Consort Dowager)

== Reign ==
Li Xin made his uncle Song Yao the Libationer of the Military Council, around the same level as chief minister. Li Xin carried out cruel punishments and favored palace construction projects, both of which made the people feel burdened. He also made plans to attack Northern Liang, further burdening his state.

Later in 417, Juqu Mengxun tried to trick Li Xin by having his governor of Zhangye Commandery (張掖, roughly modern Zhangye, Gansu), Juqu Guangzong (沮渠廣宗) pretend to surrender to Li Xin. Li Xin, as requested by Juqu Guangzong, mobilized forces to try to relieve Juqu Guangzong at Zhangye, and Juqu Mengxun waited to ready to ambush Li Xin. However, on the way to Zhangye, Li Xin realized that there was a trap, and he withdrew. Juqu Mengxun tried to attack him, but he defeated Juqu Mengxun.

In 418, Juqu Mengxun attacked Western Liang again, and Li Xin was preparing to meet him in battle. His official Zhang Tishun (張體順) persuaded him against it, however, and instead he stayed in his capital Jiuquan (酒泉, in modern Jiuquan, Gansu), and Juqu Mengxun, not willing to siege the city, withdrew. Later that year, because he had previously sent messengers to Jin, offering to be a vassal, Jin created him the Duke of Jiuquan.

In 419, with Li Xin's punishments and construction projects overburdening his people, his officials Zhang Xian (張顯) and Fan Cheng (氾稱) advised him to be more lenient and more thrifty, pointing out that he would otherwise not be able to defeat Juqu Mengxun. Li Xin ignored their advice.

In 420, Juqu Mengxun set another trap for Li Xin. He pretended to attack Western Qin's city Haomen (浩亹, in modern Haidong Prefecture, Qinghai), but once reaching Haomen, immediately withdrew and hid his army at Chuanyan (川巖, near Zhangye). Li Xin, believing wrongly that Juqu Mengxun's defenses were down, decided to attack Zhangye, against the advice of Song Yao and Zhang Tishun. Princess Dowager Yin also spoke against it, pointing out that he had insufficient strength to conquer Northern Liang and warning him that a defeat would destroy his state. He ignored them, but as they had predicted, as he approached Zhangye, Juqu Mengxun intercepted him and defeated him. His generals then advised him to quickly withdraw to Jiuquan, but Li Xin, stating that he had disobeyed his mother and would only be able to see her again after a victory, engaged Juqu Mengxun again, suffering an even greater defeat, and he was killed in battle. Juqu Mengxun quickly captured Jiuquan, and by 421 would take over the rest of Western Liang territory, marking its end.

== Personal information ==
- Father
  - Li Gao
- Mother
  - Lady Yin
- Children
  - Li Zhong'er (李重耳), the heir apparent, later official under Liu Song and Northern Wei, whose descendant Li Yuan would become the house of Tang emperors.

== Notes ==
Lord Hou of (Western) Liang House of Li Died: 420
Chinese nobility
Preceded by Li Gao	Duke of Western Liang; 417–420	Succeeded by Li Xun
Recreated Title last held by Lü Guang	Duke of Jiuquan; 418–420	Succeeded by Li Xun
Titles in pretence
Preceded by Li Gao	— TITULAR — Emperor of China; 417–420; Reason for succession failure: Sixteen Kingdoms	Succeeded by Li Xun
Preceded by Li Gao	— TITULAR — Emperor of China; 417–420; Reason for succession failure: Sixteen Kingdoms	Succeeded by Juqu Mengxun
