= Jiuquan =

Jiuquan 酒泉市 Tsiuchuan
- Prefecture-level city
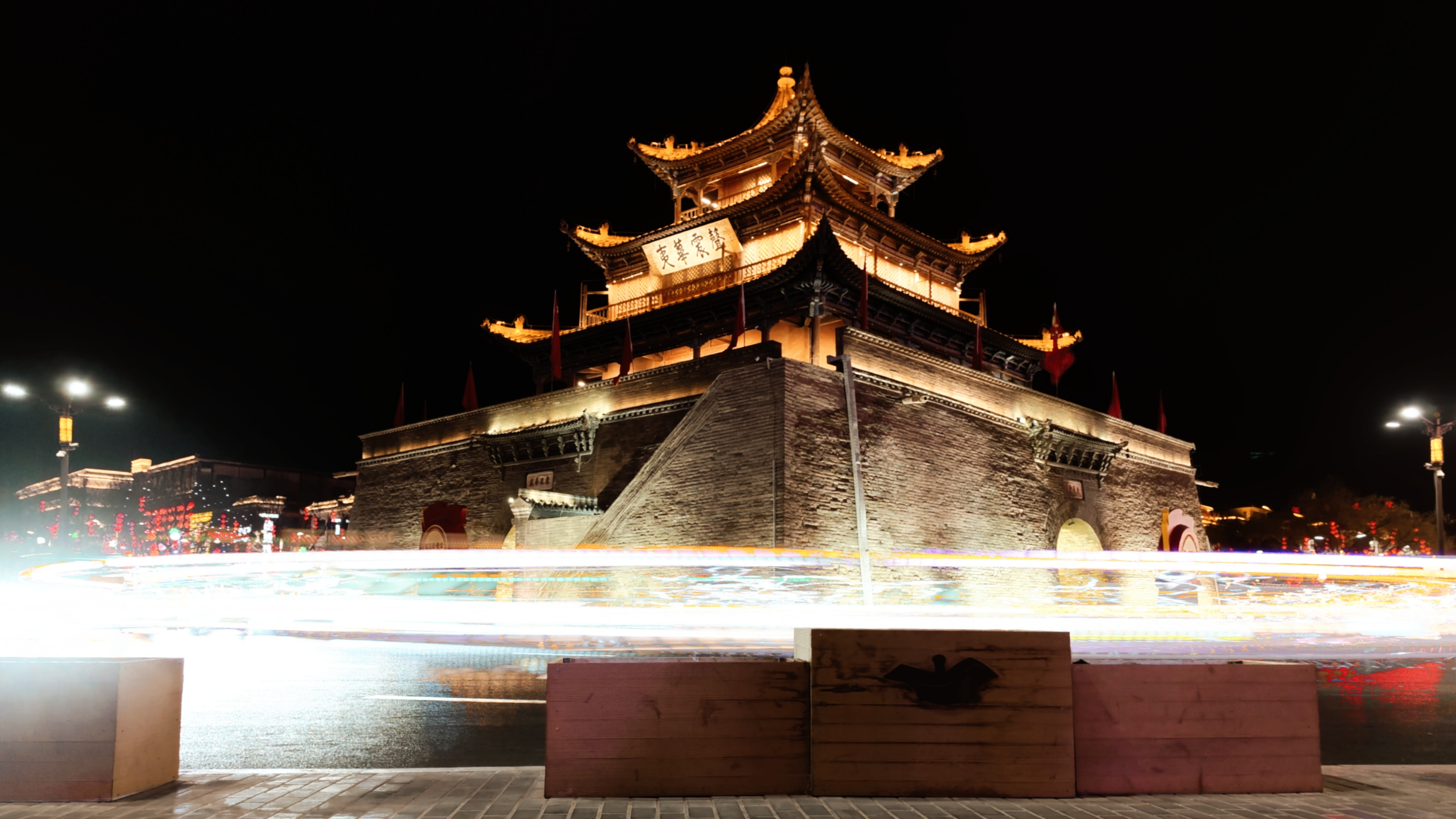
- Jiuquan Bell Tower

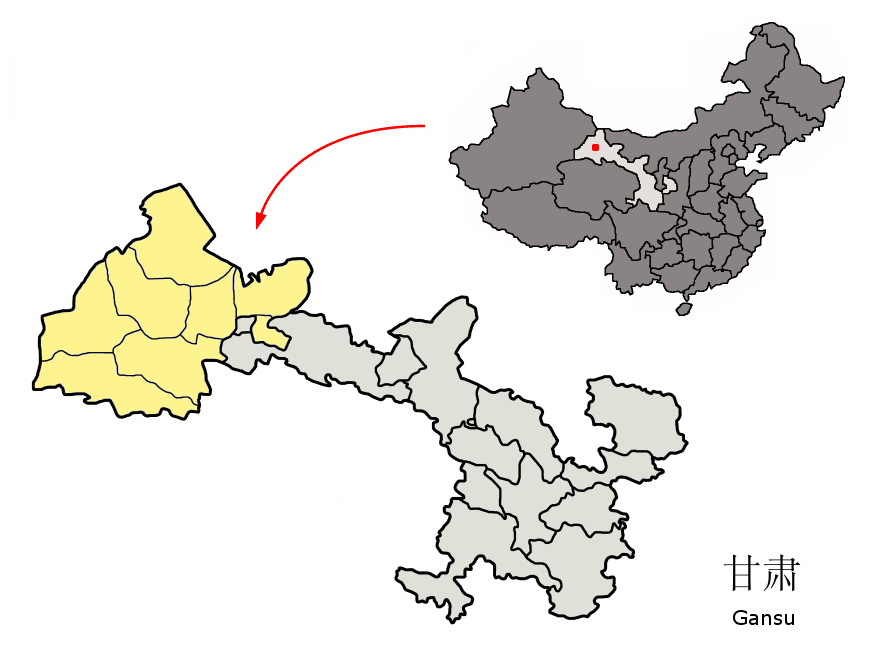
- Location of Jiuquan City jurisdiction in Gansu

- Location of the city center in Gansu Jiuquan (China)
- Coordinates (Jiuquan government): 39°44′00″N 98°29′39″E
- Country: People's Republic of China
- Province: Gansu
- Municipal seat: Suzhou District

Area
  - Prefecture-level city: 167,883 km^{2} (64,820 sq mi)
  - Urban: 3,353 km^{2} (1,295 sq mi)
  - Metro: 4,577 km^{2} (1,767 sq mi)
- Elevation: 1,483 m (4,865 ft)

Population (2022)
  - Prefecture-level city: 1,053,100
  - Density: 6.2728/km^{2} (16.247/sq mi)
  - Urban: 693,959
  - Urban density: 207.0/km^{2} (536.0/sq mi)
  - Metro: 768,274
  - Metro density: 167.9/km^{2} (434.7/sq mi)

GDP
  - Prefecture-level city: CN¥ 84.1 billion US$ 12.2 billion
  - Per capita: CN¥ 79,840; US$ 11,573
- Time zone: UTC+8 (China Standard)
- Postal code: 735000
- Area code: 0937
- ISO 3166 code: CN-GS-09
- Licence plate prefixes: 甘F
- Website: www.jiuquan.gov.cn

Jiuquan
- Chinese: 酒泉
- Postal: Kiuchwan
- Literal meaning: "Alcohol Spring(s)"
Transcriptions
Standard Mandarin
- Hanyu Pinyin: Jiǔquán
- Wade–Giles: Chiu³-chʻüan²
- IPA: [tɕjòʊ.tɕʰɥɛ̌n]
Yue: Cantonese
- Yale Romanization: Jáu-chyùhn

Former names

Fulu
- Traditional Chinese: 福祿
- Simplified Chinese: 福禄
- Literal meaning: Fortunate & Lucky
Transcriptions
Standard Mandarin
- Hanyu Pinyin: Fúlù
- Wade–Giles: Fu²-lu⁴

Suzhou
- Traditional Chinese: 肅州
- Simplified Chinese: 肃州
- Postal: Suchow
- Literal meaning: Solemn Prefectural [Capital]
Transcriptions
Standard Mandarin
- Hanyu Pinyin: Sùzhōu
- Wade–Giles: Su⁴-chou¹

Jiuquan, formerly known as Suzhou, is a prefecture-level city in the northwesternmost part of Gansu Province in the People's Republic of China. It is more than 600 km (370 mi) wide from east to west, occupying 191,342 km^{2} (73,878 sq mi), although its built-up area is mostly located in its Suzhou District.

== Name ==
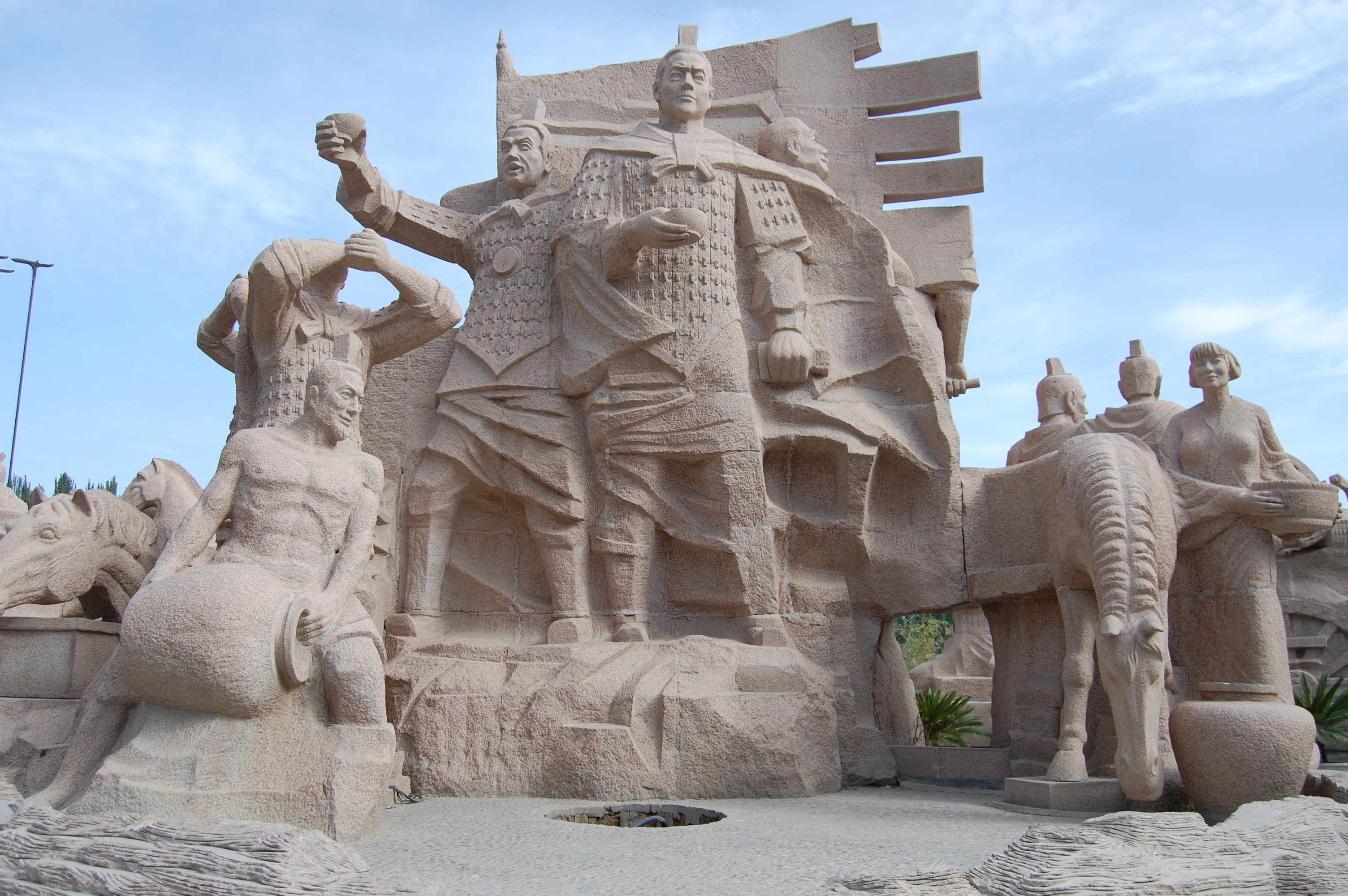
Statue of Huo Qubing in Jiuquan city

The city was formerly known as Fulu, which became known as Suzhou (Suchow, Su-chow, &c.) after it became the seat of Su Prefecture under the Sui. As the seat of Jiuquan Commandery, it eventually became known by that name in turn. The name Jiuquan — "jiu (Chinese alcohol) spring(s)" — derives from a legendary story of the young Han general Huo Qubing, who was said to have poured a vat of precious alcohol into a local creek to share its taste with his troops after a victory over the Xiongnu nomads.

== History ==
Fulu was founded in 111 BC as an outpost in the Hexi Corridor near the Yumen Pass along the overland Silk Road. Jiuquan was a Han prefecture and, under the Eastern Han, an active military garrison. Su Prefecture was established under the Sui and renamed Jiuquan Commandery under the Tang. In 624, Jiuquan County was established. In 763, it was occupied by Tibetan Empire. After the fall of the Tibetan Empire, it was controlled by the Ganzhou Uyghur Kingdom. In 1028, it was seized by Xixia. During the Yuan Dynasty, Suzhou Lu was established under Gansu Province. It sometimes served as the capital of the province of Gansu. Along with its role protecting trade along the Silk Road, Suzhou was the great center of the rhubarb trade.

Under the Ming, Suzhou was the site where the Portuguese Jesuit missionary Bento de Góis was robbed and died in 1607 during the exploration that finally established that Cathay and China were a single country. Meng Qiaofang took it from Ding Guodong in 1649. The Hui under Ma Wenlu held it during the Dungan Revolt. It was completely destroyed by the time it was recovered by the Qing general Zuo Zongtang in 1873 but it was swiftly rebuilt.

== Administrative divisions ==
Jiuquan is made up of one district, two counties, two autonomous counties and two country-level cities.

Map
Name	Hanzi	Hanyu Pinyin	Population (2010 census)	Area (km^{2})	Density (/km^{2})
Suzhou District	肃州区	Sùzhōu Qū	428,346	3,353	127.8
Yumen City	玉门市	Yùmén Shì	159,792	13,310	12.01
Dunhuang City	敦煌市	Dūnhuáng Shì	186,027	26,720	6.96
Jinta County	金塔县	Jīntǎ Xiàn	147,460	16,250	9.07
Guazhou County	瓜州县	Guāzhōu Xiàn	148,798	23,570	6.31
Subei Mongol Autonomous County	肃北蒙古族 自治县	Sùběi Měnggǔzú; Zìzhìxiàn	14,979	55,370	0.27
Aksai Kazakh Autonomous County	阿克塞哈萨克族 自治县	Ākèsài Hāsàkèzú; Zìzhìxiàn	10,545	29,110	0.36

== Geography ==
Jiuquan occupies the westernmost part of Gansu, bordering Zhangye City to the east, Qinghai to the south, Xinjiang to the west, Ejin Banner, Alxa league of Inner Mongolia and Mongolia to the north. Its administrative area ranges in latitude from 37° 58' to 42° 48' N and in longitude from 92° 09' to 100° 20' E, and reaches a maximal north–south extent of 550 km (340 mi) and maximal east–west width of 680 km (420 mi). Suzhou District is approximately 1,500 meters (4,900 ft) above sea level.

=== Climate ===
Jiuquan has a cold desert climate (Köppen BWk), with long, cold winters, and hot, somewhat dry summers. Monthly average temperatures range from −8.9 °C (16.0 °F) in January to 22.3 °C (72.1 °F) in July, with an annual mean of 7.79 °C (46.0 °F). The diurnal temperature variation is relatively large, averaging 13.8 °C (24.8 °F) annually. With monthly percent possible sunshine ranging from 62% in July to 77% in October, the city receives 3,031 hours of bright sunshine annually. With sunny weather and low humidity dominating year-round, the area hosts one of the launch sites for the PRC's space programme.

Climate data for Jiuquan, elevation 1,477 m (4,846 ft), (1991–2020 normals, extremes 1951–present)
Month	Jan	Feb	Mar	Apr	May	Jun	Jul	Aug	Sep	Oct	Nov	Dec	Year
Record high °C (°F)	15.8 (60.4)	16.8 (62.2)	25.2 (77.4)	31.7 (89.1)	34.4 (93.9)	36.1 (97.0)	38.4 (101.1)	38.0 (100.4)	33.0 (91.4)	29.0 (84.2)	19.6 (67.3)	17.3 (63.1)	38.4 (101.1)
Mean daily maximum °C (°F)	−1.8 (28.8)	3.3 (37.9)	10.5 (50.9)	18.4 (65.1)	23.7 (74.7)	27.9 (82.2)	29.7 (85.5)	28.3 (82.9)	23.1 (73.6)	15.8 (60.4)	7.3 (45.1)	−0.3 (31.5)	15.5 (59.9)
Daily mean °C (°F)	−9.1 (15.6)	−4.1 (24.6)	2.9 (37.2)	10.9 (51.6)	16.5 (61.7)	21.1 (70.0)	22.7 (72.9)	20.8 (69.4)	15.1 (59.2)	7.8 (46.0)	0.1 (32.2)	−7.3 (18.9)	8.1 (46.6)
Mean daily minimum °C (°F)	−14.9 (5.2)	−10.3 (13.5)	−3.3 (26.1)	3.9 (39.0)	9.1 (48.4)	13.9 (57.0)	15.7 (60.3)	13.9 (57.0)	8.6 (47.5)	1.6 (34.9)	−5.4 (22.3)	−12.7 (9.1)	1.7 (35.0)
Record low °C (°F)	−28.6 (−19.5)	−31.6 (−24.9)	−25.7 (−14.3)	−10.6 (12.9)	−3.4 (25.9)	2.4 (36.3)	7.7 (45.9)	4.4 (39.9)	−3.7 (25.3)	−16.9 (1.6)	−24.2 (−11.6)	−29.8 (−21.6)	−31.6 (−24.9)
Average precipitation mm (inches)	2.2 (0.09)	1.4 (0.06)	5.0 (0.20)	3.8 (0.15)	8.6 (0.34)	17.7 (0.70)	21.6 (0.85)	17.3 (0.68)	10.7 (0.42)	3.5 (0.14)	2.1 (0.08)	2.6 (0.10)	96.5 (3.81)
Average precipitation days (≥ 0.1 mm)	2.4	1.5	2.4	2.4	3.9	5.3	7.5	5.9	3.1	1.6	1.6	2.6	40.2
Average snowy days	3.7	2.6	3.2	1.1	0.2	0	0	0	0	0.6	2.6	4.1	18.1
Average relative humidity (%)	55	45	40	33	35	42	51	53	52	47	50	58	47
Mean monthly sunshine hours	216.2	217.5	253.1	273.5	303.4	295.0	287.8	280.7	265.6	267.0	226.1	209.7	3,095.6
Percentage possible sunshine	71	71	68	68	68	66	64	67	72	79	77	72	70
Source: China Meteorological Administration all-time extreme temperatureNOAA

== Transport ==
Jiuquan is served by China National Highway 312 and the Lanzhou-Xinjiang (Lanxin) Railway. The Lanxin Railway has several side branches within Jiuquan Prefecture. In particular, a railway branch runs from the Liugou Station in Guazhou County to Dunhuang, serving both Guazhou county seat and Dunhuang. There are plans to expand it further south into Qinghai; the extension, known as the Golmud–Dunhuang Railway, will connect Dunhuang to Golmud, Qinghai on the Qinghai–Tibet railway. There is also the Jiayuguan–Ceke branch, which runs through the desert areas of Jiuquan Prefecture's Jinta County.

Jiuquan is also served by Jiuquan Airport. There is also Dunhuang Airport in Dunhuang.

== Space launch center ==
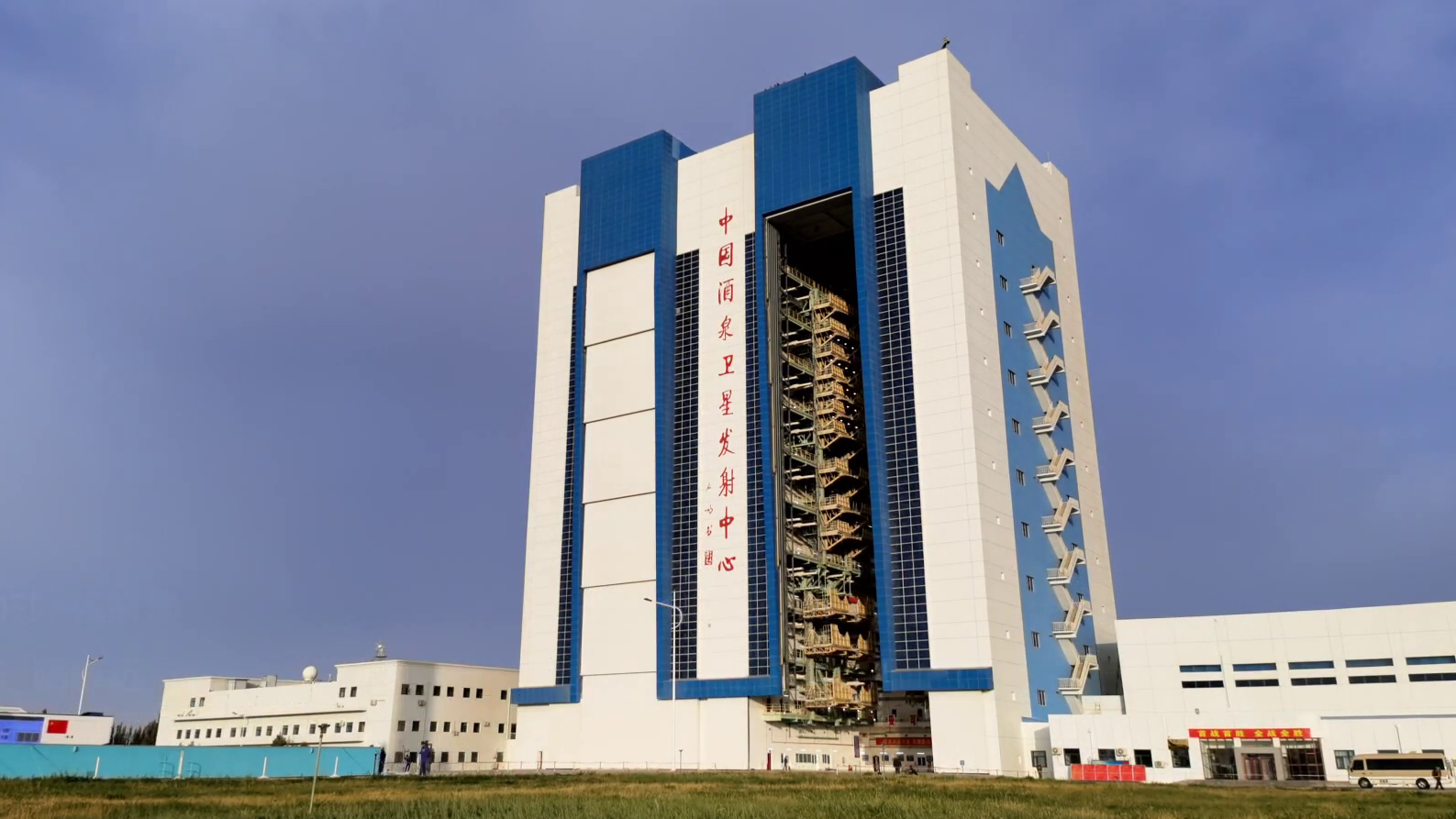
The vertical assembly test plant in Jiuquan Satellite Launch Center

Jiuquan is the closest major city to the Jiuquan Satellite Launch Center. Still, the space launch center is more than 100 km (62 mi) away from the city, and is actually located not in Gansu province, but in the neighboring Inner Mongolia Autonomous Region. It was built in 1958; the first Chinese human spaceflight, Shenzhou 5 was launched there on 15 October 2003, making Yang Liwei China's first astronaut and a national hero. The second was in 2005.

== Culture ==
Jiuquan is known within China as the first site of rhubarb cultivation.

== See also ==
- Silk Route Museum
- Mogao Caves
