= Kooros couch =

- The Kooros couch, Vahid Kooros Collection.
- Created: 557-618 CE
- Discovered: Tianshui, Northern China
- Present location: Gansu Provincial Museum

The Kooros couch is a 6-7th century (Northern Zhou/Sui dynasty) funeral monument to an anonymous Sogdian nobleman and official in northern China (the epitaph has been lost). The tomb was probably discovered in the northern city of Tianshui in a clandestine excavation. It belonged to the "Vahid Kooros collection" after which it was named, and was briefly presented in the Musée Guimet in 2004, but has since disappeared. It is one of the major known examples of Sogdian tombs in China.

The stone couch, similar to other Sogdian tombs in China and contemporary Chinese tombs, is composed of a pedestal with stone slabs around the couch, decorated with reliefs showing the life of the deceased and scene of the afterlife, particularly hunting, drinking and feasting. The iconography of the panels is rather excentric, or "Bacchic".

Given the iconographical content of the tomb, the owner may not have been Sogdian, but rather may have originated from northern India or Tokharistan (Bactria).

== See also ==
- Tomb of Li Dan
