= Tianshui tomb =

Sui dynasty tomb in northern China

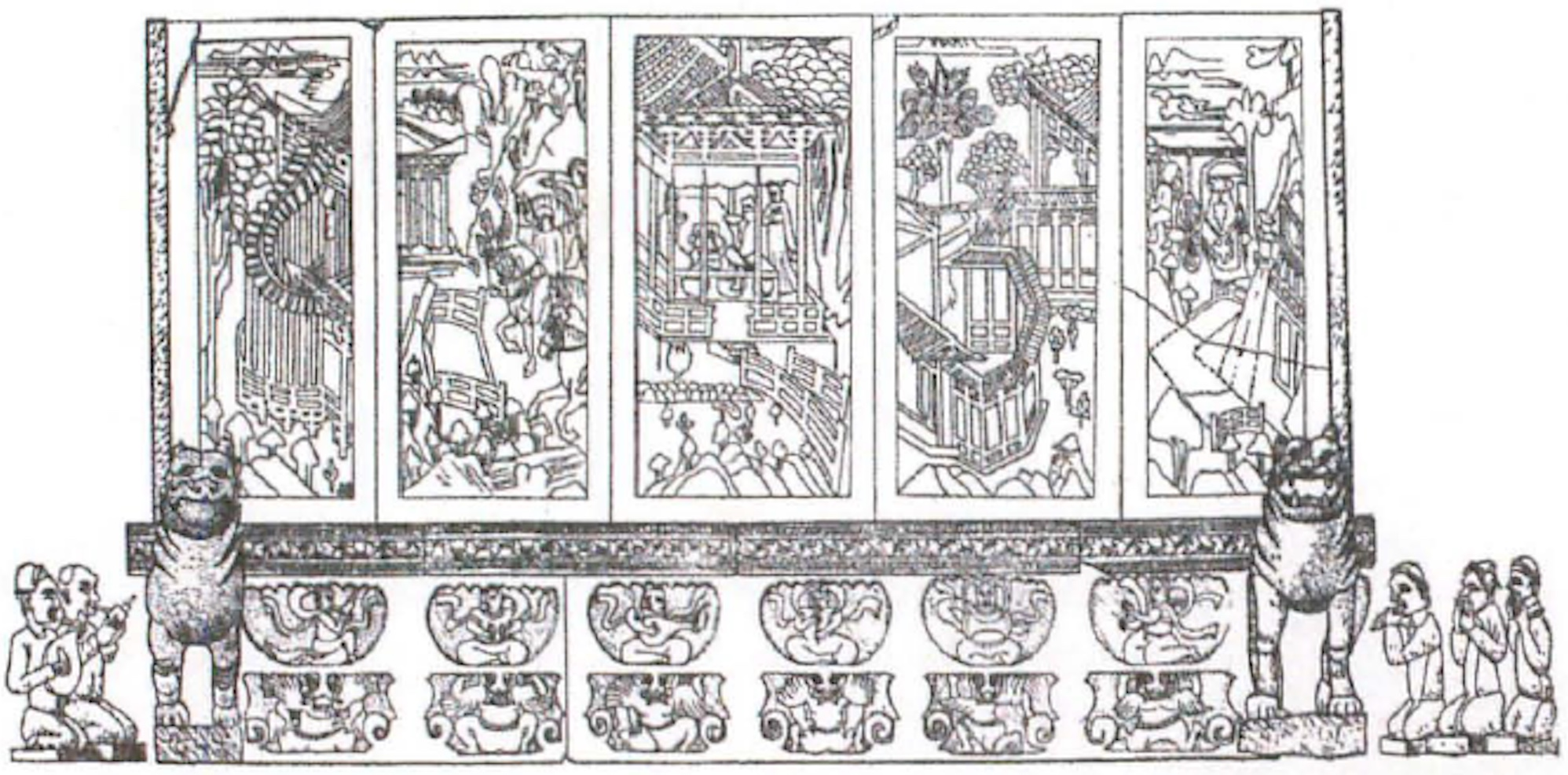
- Tomb of Tianshui, China.
- Created: 581–624 CE
- Discovered: Tianshui, Northern China
- Present location: Gansu Provincial Museum

Location

The Tianshui tomb (Chinese: 天水粟特墓), also Tomb of Shimaping (Chinese:石马坪粟特墓) is a Sui dynasty (581–618 CE) funerary monument of an anonymous Sogdian nobleman and official in northern China. The tomb was discovered in the northern city of Tianshui in 1982. It is now located in the collections of the Tianshui City Museum (天水市博物馆). It is one of the major known examples of Sogdian tombs in China.

The stone couch, similar to other Sogdian tombs in China and contemporary Chinese tombs, is composed of a pedestal with stone slabs around the couch, decorated with reliefs showing the life of the deceased and scene of the afterlife, particularly hunting, drinking and feasting.

The tomb also contained a gold hairpin and a bronze mirror, suggesting that the remains of the owner and his wife had been disposed on the couch.

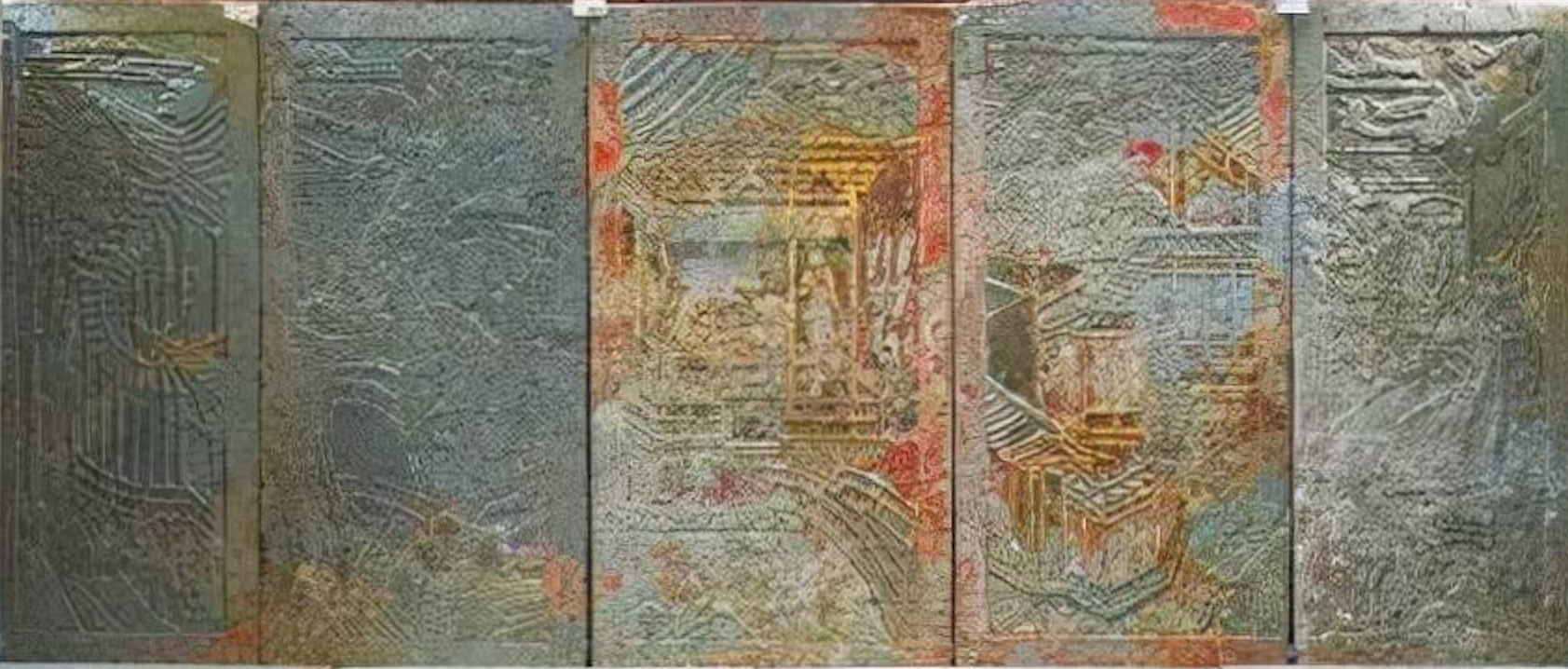
Tianshui tomb, back panels. Tianshui City Museum.

== See also ==
- Tomb of Li Dan
