= Northern Zhou =

Xianbei-led dynasty of China

Zhou 周
- 557–581 AD
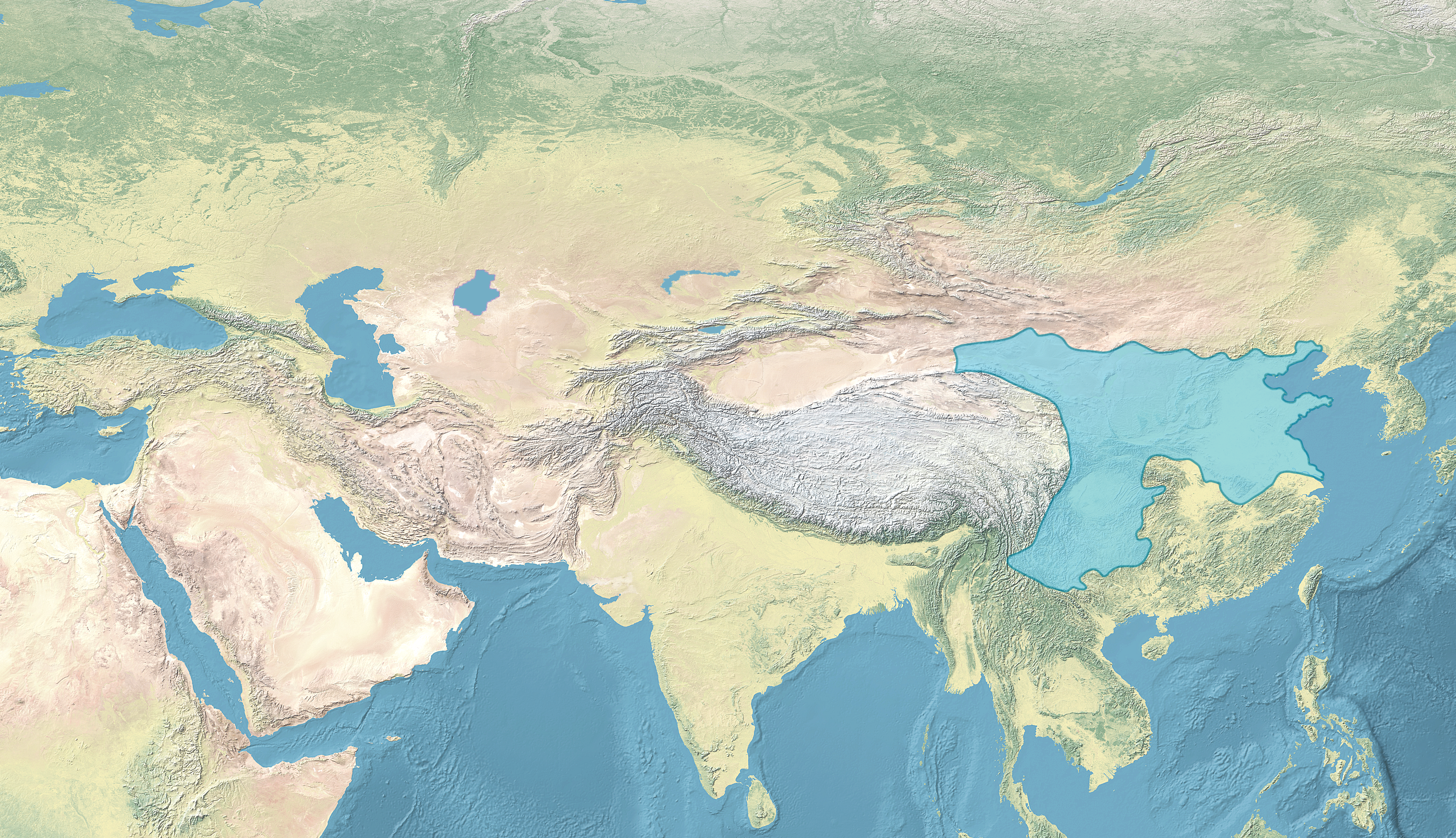
- The Northern Zhou ( ) after conquest of Northern Qi in 577
- Capital: Chang'an
- Government: Monarchy
- Emperor
  - 557: Emperor Xiaomin of Northern Zhou
  - 557–560: Emperor Ming of Northern Zhou
  - 560–578: Emperor Wu of Northern Zhou
  - 578–579: Emperor Xuan of Northern Zhou
  - 579–581: Emperor Jing of Northern Zhou
- History
  - Established: 15 February 557
  - Disestablished: 4 March 581 AD

Area
- 577: 1,500,000 km^{2} (580,000 sq mi)
- Currency: Chinese coin, Chinese cash
Preceded by	Succeeded by
Western Wei; Northern Qi	Sui dynasty
- Today part of: China; Mongolia

Zhou (/dʒoʊ/), known in historiography as the Northern Zhou (Chinese: 北周; pinyin: Běi Zhōu), was a Xianbei-led dynasty of China (founded by member of Yuwen tribe of Xiongnu origin) that lasted from 557 to 581 AD. One of the Northern dynasties of China's Northern and Southern dynasties period, it succeeded the Western Wei dynasty and was eventually overthrown by the Sui dynasty.

== History ==
=== State name ===
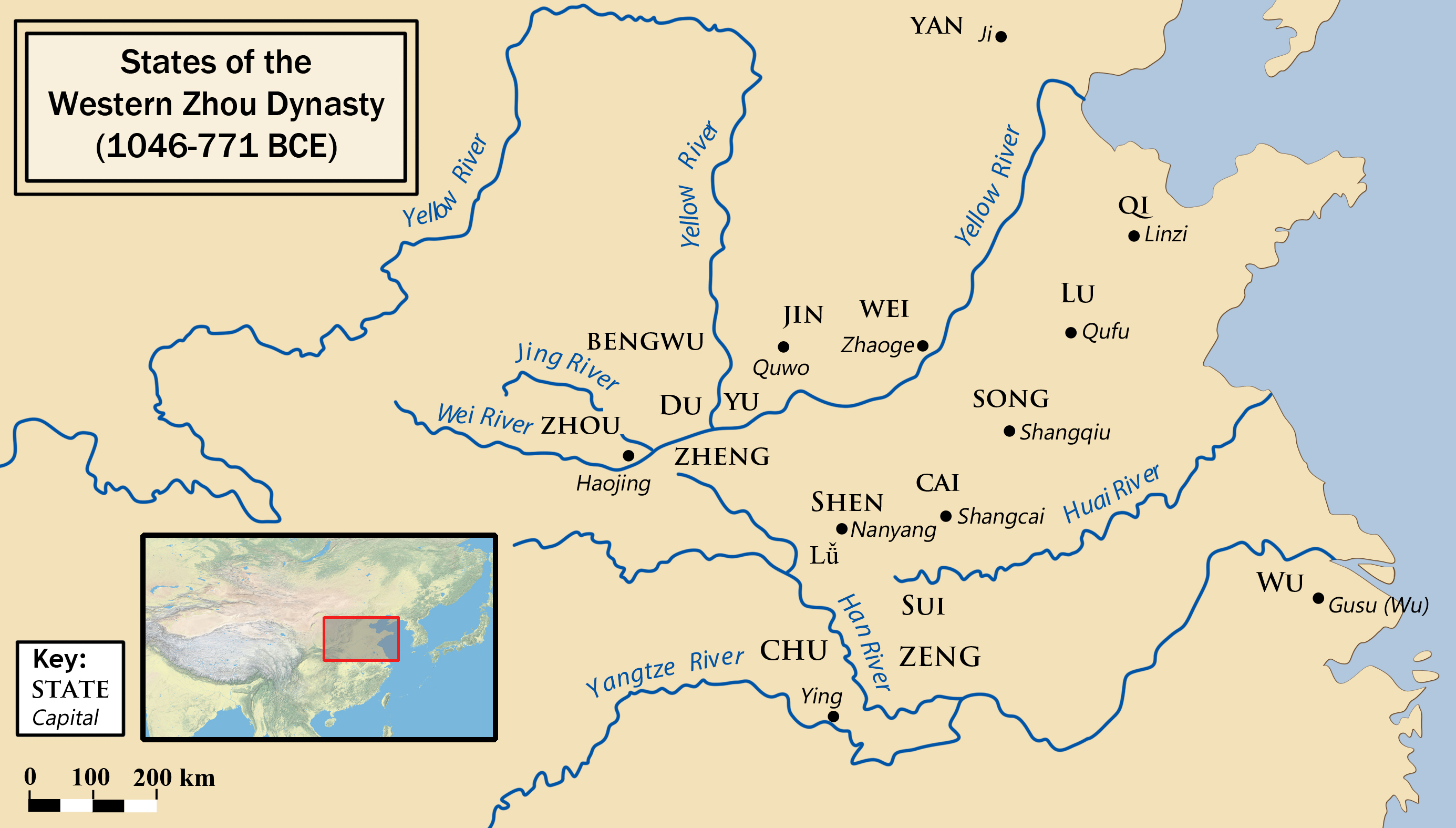
Chinese states in Western Zhou. The core region of Zhou regime is labelled as "Zhou" in the image, which occupies current day Shaanxi Province, and the capital Haojing was also the capital of Northern Zhou, Chang'an

The state name of the Northern Zhou was "Zhou", which was based in the region of Guannei (關內). As one of the Northern Dynasties regimes, it was located in the north, and is therefore known historically as "Northern Zhou" to distinguish it from other regimes that used "Zhou" as their state name. In addition, because the imperial house bore the surname "Yuwen," it was also called "Yuwen Zhou" (宇文周). It further had the alternative name "Later Zhou" (後周), in contrast to the Western Zhou and Eastern Zhou; however, because this causes confusion with the later Later Zhou established during the Five Dynasties and Ten Kingdoms period, this name is rarely used by later generations.

The state name of the Northern Zhou derived from the noble title "Duke of Zhou" held by its founder, Emperor Min of Northern Zhou, Yuwen Jue, before his accession. This title had been conferred only shortly before the founding of the Northern Zhou by Emperor Gong, the last emperor of the Western Wei, the two events being less than a month apart. The reason for taking "Zhou" as the noble title and state name lay in the Yuwen family's admiration for the Rites of Zhou and the Zhou system, as well as their desire to associate themselves with the Zhou dynasty. This was also of a piece with the Western Wei and Northern Zhou's vigorous claims to have carried out reforms based on the Zhou system, demonstrating that their own dynasty was inherited from the Ji-clan Zhou, and thereby adding legitimacy to the abdication (shanrang) between the Wei (Northern Wei–Western Wei) and the Zhou. At the same time, it carried the intention of opposing the Northern Qi and the Southern Dynasties, and of winning over the various Hu (non-Han) and Han peoples within its borders. Northern Zhou dynasty founded by member of Yuwen tribe. Yuwen were descendants of the nomadic Xiongnu who integrated into the Xianbei after 89 CE and ruled the Kumo Xi and Khitan.

=== Establishment ===
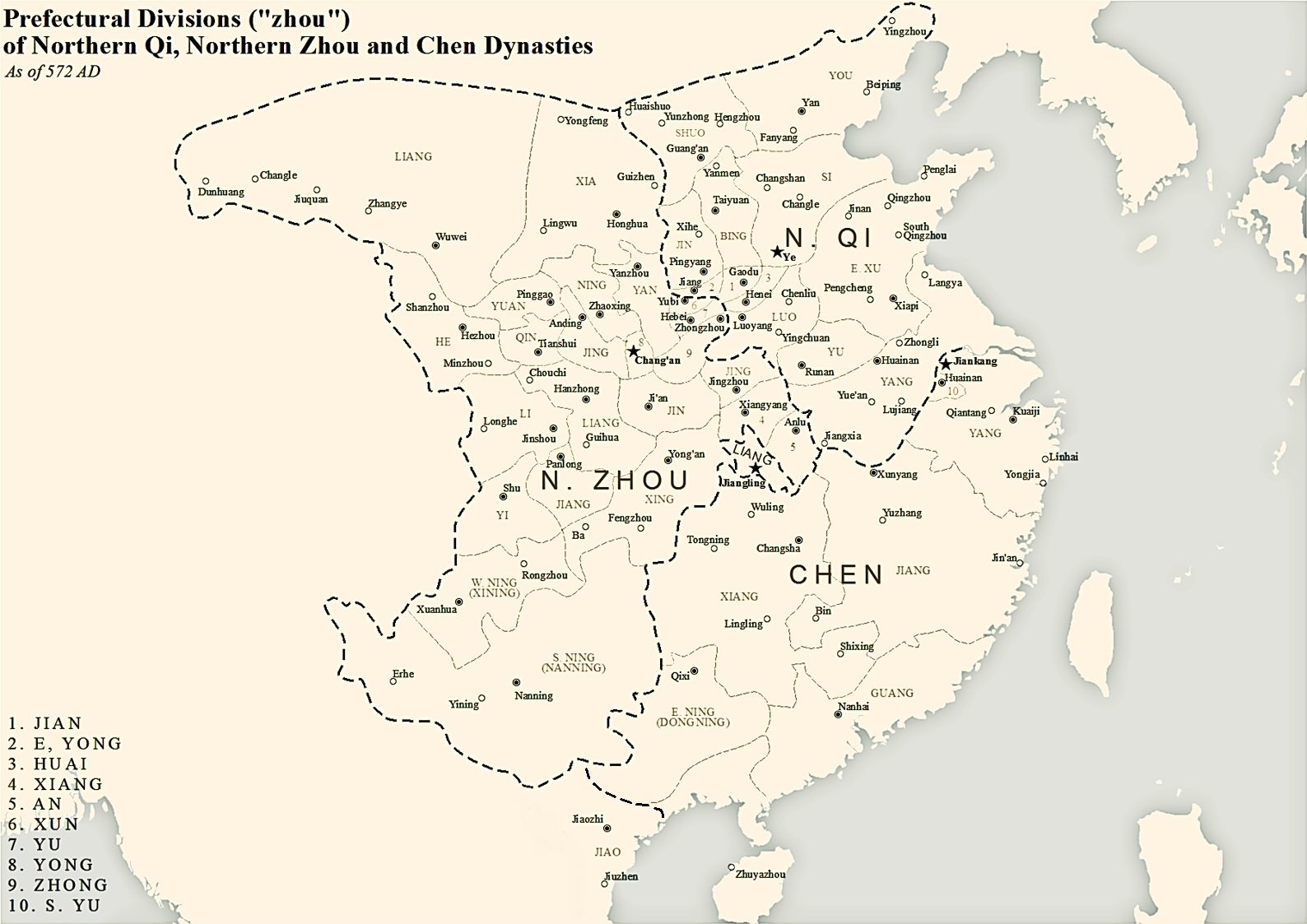
Administrative divisions as of 572

The Northern Zhou's basis of power was established by Yuwen Tai, who was paramount general of Western Wei, following the split of Northern Wei into Western Wei and Eastern Wei in 535. After Yuwen Tai's death in 556, Yuwen Tai's nephew Yuwen Hu forced Emperor Gong of Western Wei to yield the throne to Yuwen Tai's son Yuwen Jue (Emperor Xiaomin), establishing Northern Zhou. The reigns of the first three emperors (Yuwen Tai's sons) – Emperor Xiaomin, Emperor Ming, and Emperor Wu were dominated by Yuwen Hu, until Emperor Wu ambushed and killed Yuwen Hu in 572 and assumed power personally.

=== Unified north China ===
Major powers in Eurasia around 555 AD, notice that North Zhou only occupied Western China at this time, and it later conquered North Qi in 577

With Emperor Wu as a capable ruler, Northern Zhou destroyed rival Northern Qi in 577, taking over Northern Qi's territory. However, Emperor Wu's death in 578 doomed the state, as his son Emperor Xuan was an arbitrary and violent ruler whose unorthodox behavior greatly weakened the state. After his death in 580, when he was already nominally retired (Taishang Huang), Xuan's father-in-law Yang Jian took power.

=== Transit to Sui ===
The regional commanders Yuchi Jiong, Sima Xiaonan (regional commander of Yunzhou), and Wang Qian (regional commander of Yizhou), among others, were discontented with Yang Jian's monopolization of power, and jointly rose in revolt against him, touching off the Rebellion of Yuchi Jiong; but it was suppressed by Wei Xiaokuan, Wang Yi, Gao Jiong, and others dispatched by Yang Jian. During this period, Yang Jian also had put to death Yuwen Xian, Prince of Bi—the eldest son of Emperor Ming of Northern Zhou, who held the offices of Grand Preceptor and Governor of Yongzhou—as well as the five sons of Yuwen Tai who were still living; and he established friendly relations with the Türks, whereupon the Türkic Tuobo Qaghan handed Gao Shaoyi over to the Northern Zhou. On 4 March 581, Emperor Jing of Northern Zhou abdicated the throne in favor of Yang Jian, who accepted the abdication and took the throne, changing the state name to Sui; the Northern Zhou thus perished after a reign of twenty-four years. Not long after founding his dynasty, Yang Jian had nearly all the close imperial kinsmen of the Northern Zhou put to death, and enfeoffed Yuwen Luo as Duke of Jie to maintain the ancestral sacrifices of the Northern Zhou.

== Society ==
=== Population ===
During the Shengui era (518–520) of the Northern Wei, the country had 5 million households and a population of some 30 million or more. In the last years of the Northern Wei, political corruption led to the successive outbreaks of the Rebellion of the Six Garrisons, the Rebellion of Mozhe Dati (莫折大提), the Rebellion of Du Luozhou (杜洛周), and others, and the registered households within its territory plummeted to 3,375,368. From the years when the Zhou and the Qi stood in tripartite confrontation, the household registers recovered: by 577 the Northern Qi had within its territory 3,302,528 households and 20,006,886 persons; and in 580, the household census of the former territory of the Northern Zhou recorded 3.59 million households and 9,009,604 persons. Because this household figure contradicts the 2.98 million households of the former Northern Zhou territory in the fifth year of the Sui Daye era (609), and because the average of 2.5 persons per household also does not accord with reality, the scholar Wang Yumin holds that this household figure is a copying error—that is, "1,590,000" (一百五十九萬) was mistakenly written as "3,590,000" (三百五十九萬)—and maintains that after the Zhou conquered the Qi its household count reached 6 million. The scholar Lu Yu, on the other hand, holds that the former territory of the Northern Zhou, counting military households and the population of ethnic minorities, should have had more than 12.5 million persons, and after the conquest of the Qi, 32.5 million persons.

=== Economy ===
In the economic sphere, Yuwen Tai, in accordance with the traditional Confucian notion of "first enrich, then educate," actively encouraged and promoted agriculture and sericulture, rewarded farming and planting, and correspondingly formulated and adopted a number of measures. The first was to restore the Equal-field system, which had fallen into disrepair, so as to reunite with the land those farmers who had lost their land through land annexation, warfare, and natural disasters and had drifted to other regions—thereby providing the conditions for the farmers' productive activity. The Western Wei's equal-field system, in its land grants and its rent-and-tax levies (zutiao), differed somewhat from that of the Northern Wei, but the changes were slight; in the corvée-service system, however, there were more substantial changes, with new regulations governing the age, duration, and number of persons for service. The age for service was changed from fifteen under the Northern Wei to eighteen; the duration of service was determined by the abundance or scarcity of the harvest—not exceeding one month in a good year, not exceeding twenty days in a middling year, and not exceeding ten days in a poor year—greatly shortening the service period; and as for numbers, it was stipulated that those performing service be limited to one person per farming household, so as to avoid mobilizing the people's labor excessively and hampering agricultural production. At the same time, Yuwen Tai also promulgated a household-registration system and an account-reckoning system—that is, a method of accounts (jizhang) that set in advance the approximate quantity of the following year's corvée—in order to make the levying of taxes and service more reasonable; and he further set a uniform standard for the length of a bolt of silk, taking forty chi as one bolt (pi, 匹).

== Culture ==
=== Artifacts ===
Numerous artifacts are known from the period, many of them showing contacts with Sogdians merchants who resided in China and often had official administrative positions (seen in the Tomb of An Jia or the Tomb of Wirkak), or even with northern India (Tomb of Li Dan). Central Asian precious artifacts were often included in the funeral material of Chinese people of high rank, as seen in the tomb of the Xianbei-Tuoba Northern Zhou general Li Xian.

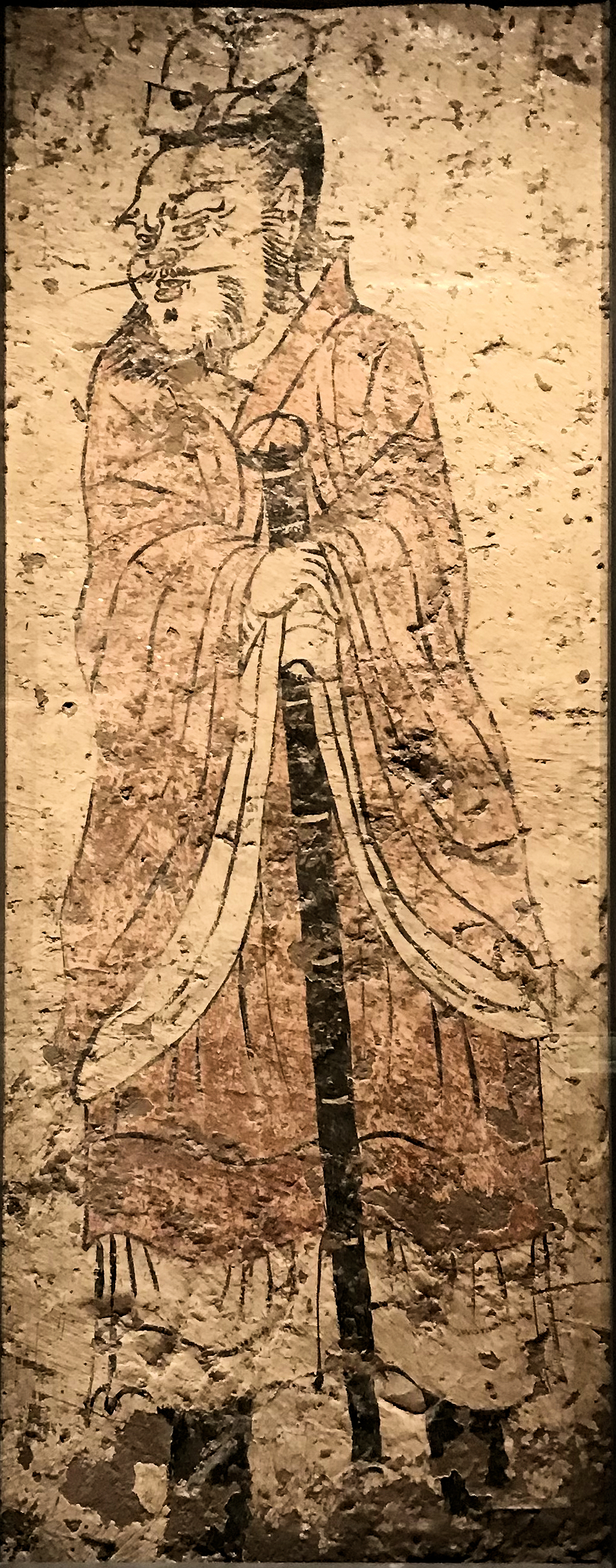
The Northern Zhou Xianbei-Tuoba general Li Xian (504-569)

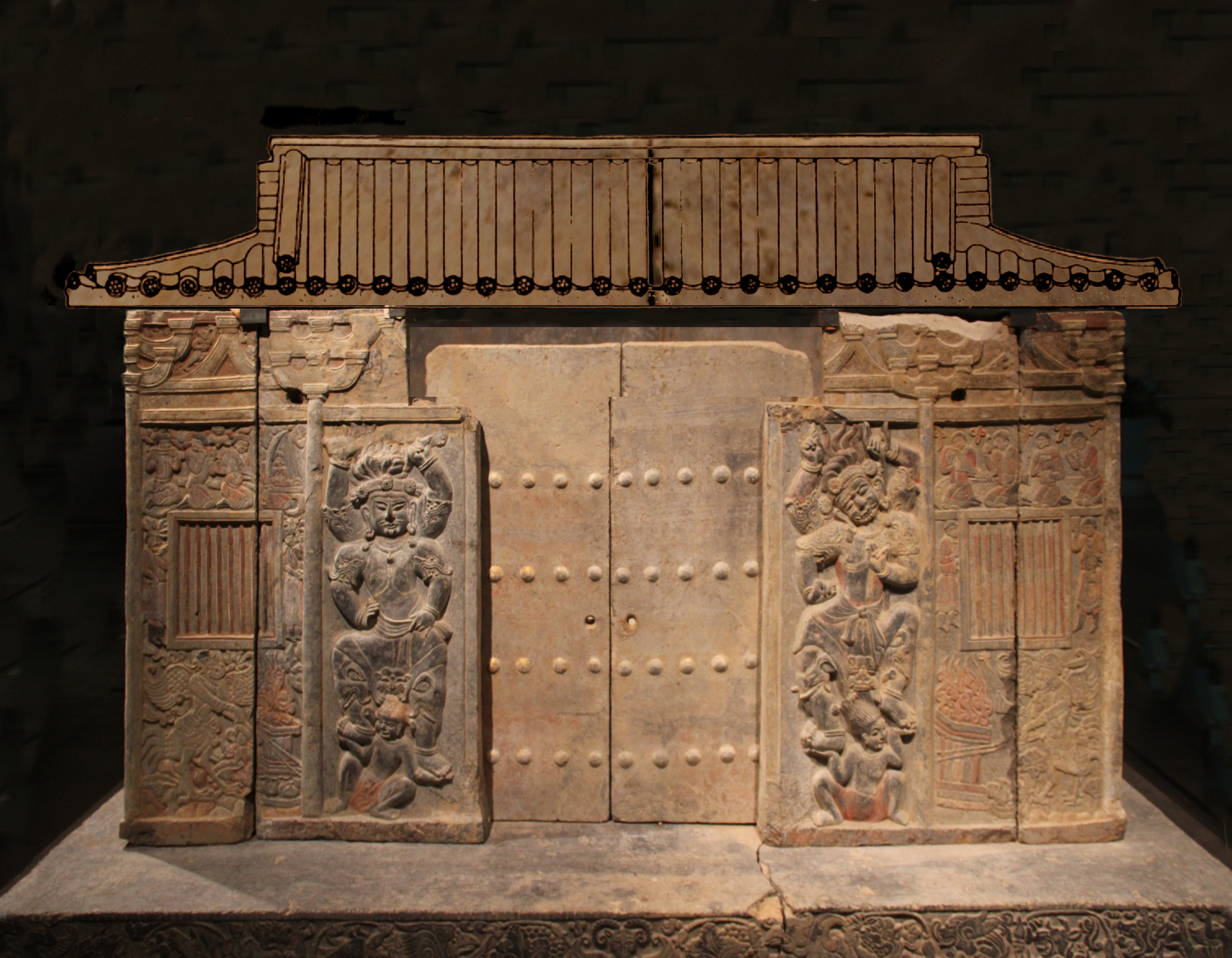
The tomb of Wirkak, a Sogdian official among the Northern Zhou, 580 CE, Xi'an City Museum

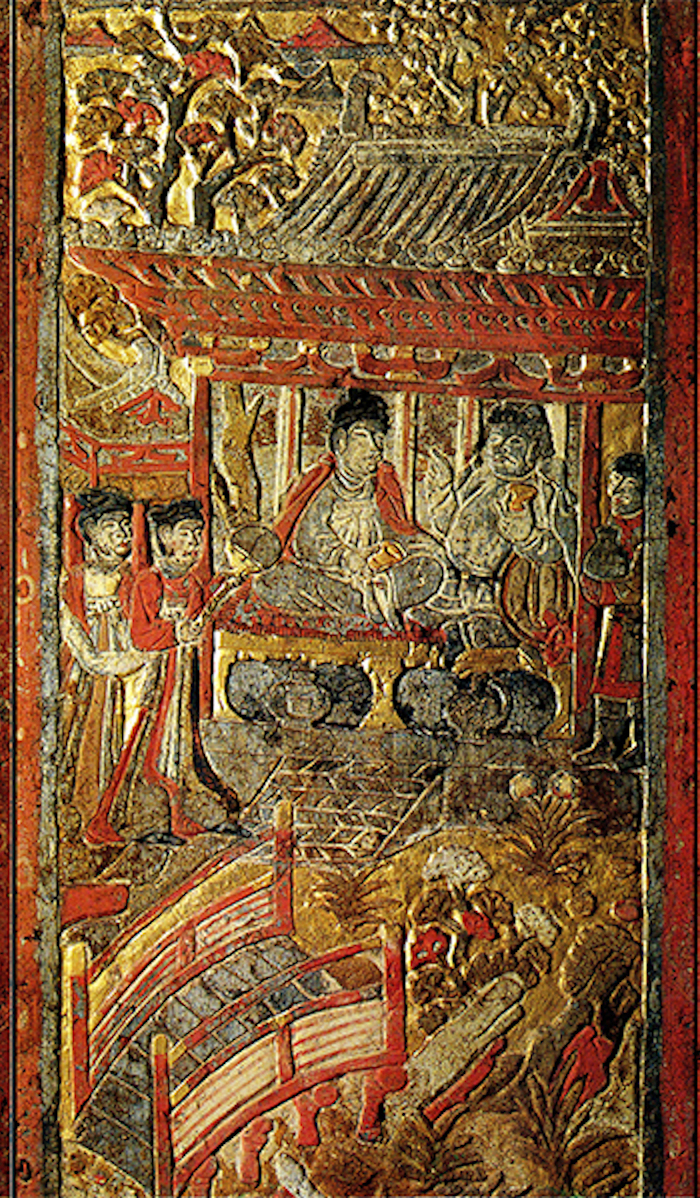
Scene in a Chinese pavilion, Tomb of An Jia, 579 CE.

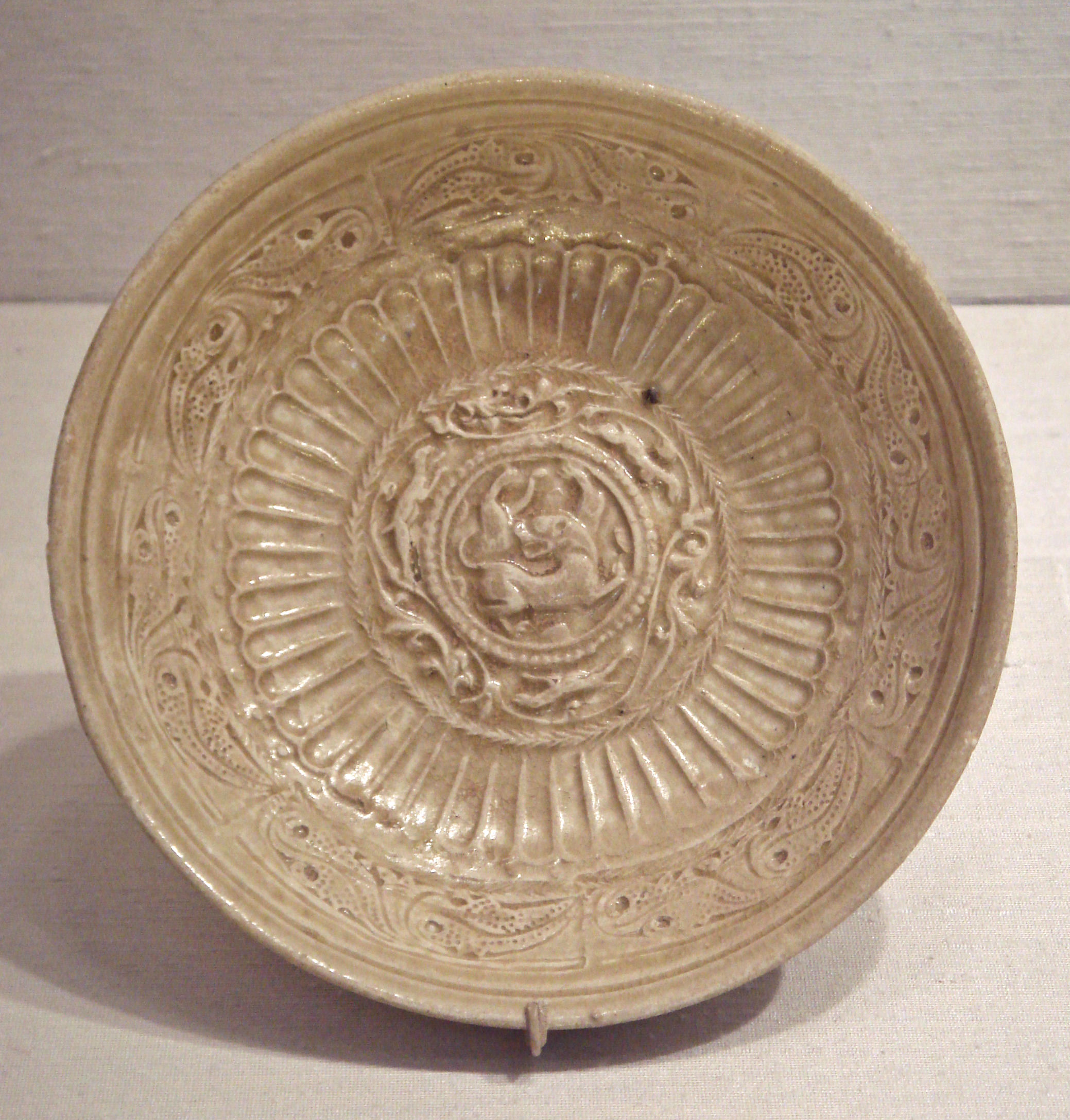
Northern Zhou dish inspired by Western metalwork, 557–581.

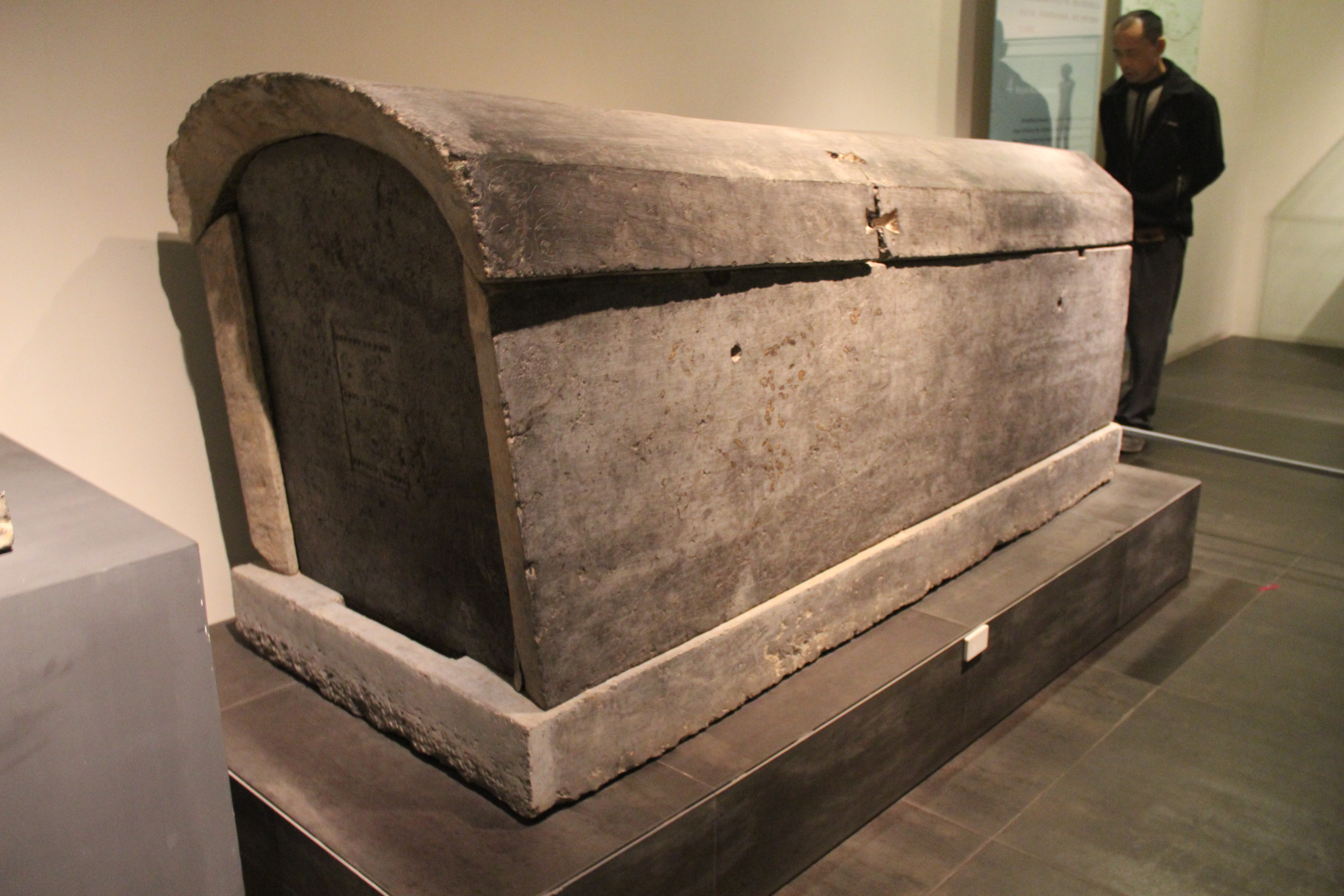
Tomb of Li Dan, an Indian "Brahmin" from Jibin, Gandhara. 564 CE Xi'an City Museum.

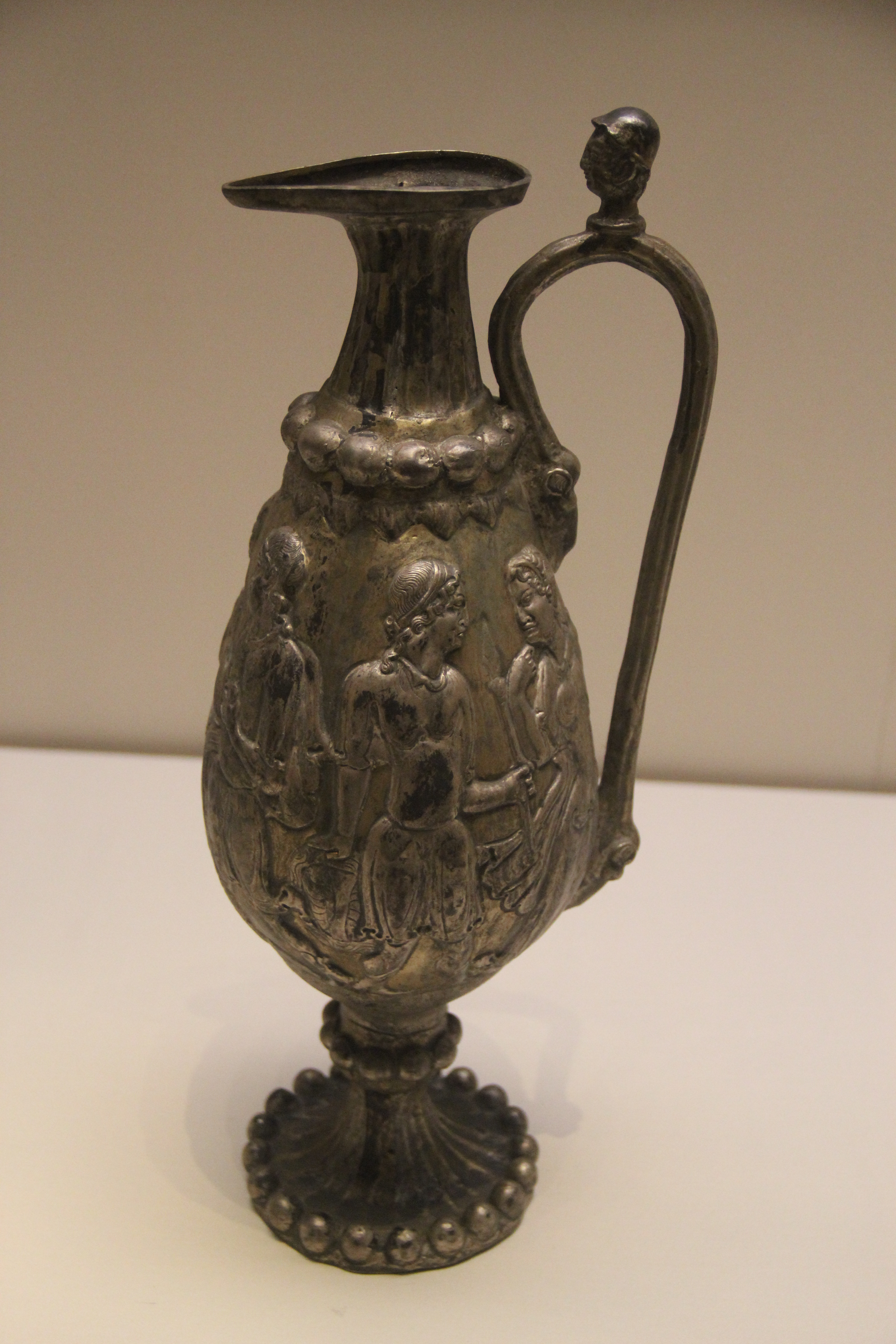
Northern Zhou gilded silver ewer in Greco-Roman style from the tomb of Li Xian.

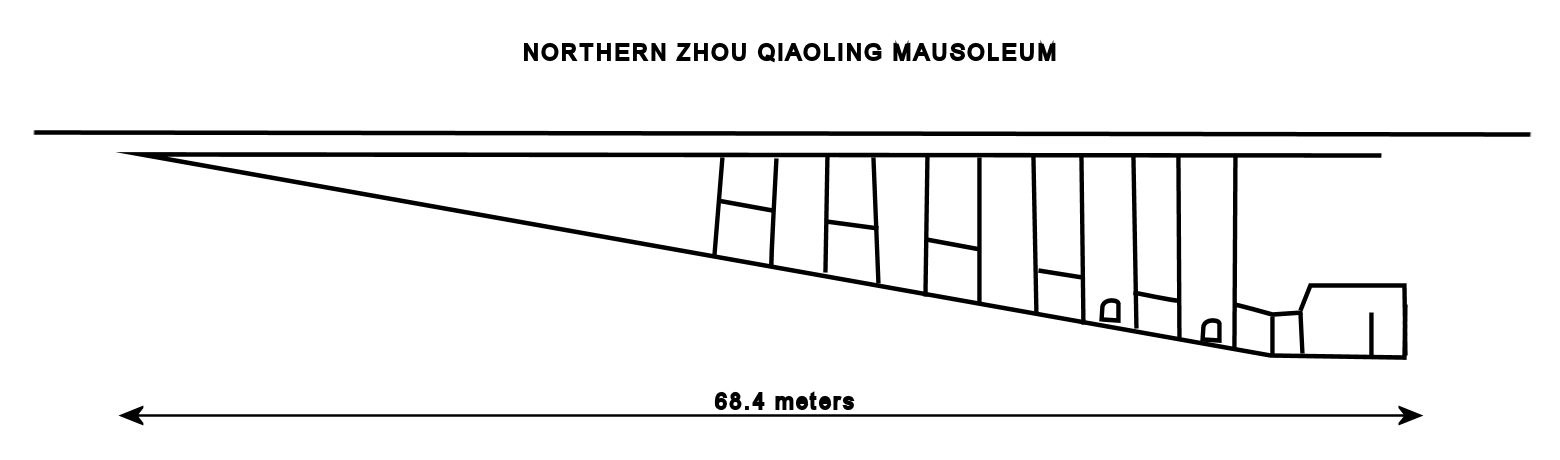
Side plan of the Northern Zhou Qiaoling Mausoleum, where Emperor Wu was buried with his Turkic wife, Empress Ashina

=== Confucianism ===
In the realm of thought and culture, Yuwen Tai was fond of Confucian learning and used Confucian doctrine as an ideological weapon to remove certain backward customs of the Xianbei people and to discard the decadent practices then in vogue in the intellectual sphere—such as the empty discussion of metaphysical mysteries and the veneration of Buddhism and Daoism. In the capital, Chang'an, he established the Imperial Academy (Guozixue) and appointed the great Confucian scholar Lu Dan as its Libationer (Jijiu, Chancellor). Through school education, he cultivated a large number of persons imbued with Confucian ideas to serve as pillars of the regime. He also, following the format of the essay "Da Gao" (Great Announcement) in the pre-Qin classic the Book of Documents (Shangshu), composed a "Da Gao" of his own to serve as a model for literary composition; in the eleventh year of the Datong era (545), he promulgated it to the assembled officials, decreeing that from then on all writing must follow this style, in an effort thereby to correct the ornate and florid literary fashion.

=== Buddhism ===
Buddhism and Buddhist art flourished under the Northern Zhou. The dynasty also contributed some of the paintings in the Dunhuang caves: specifically, narrative paintings of the biography of the Buddha in Cave 428, following the prototypes of Gandhara and Kizil.

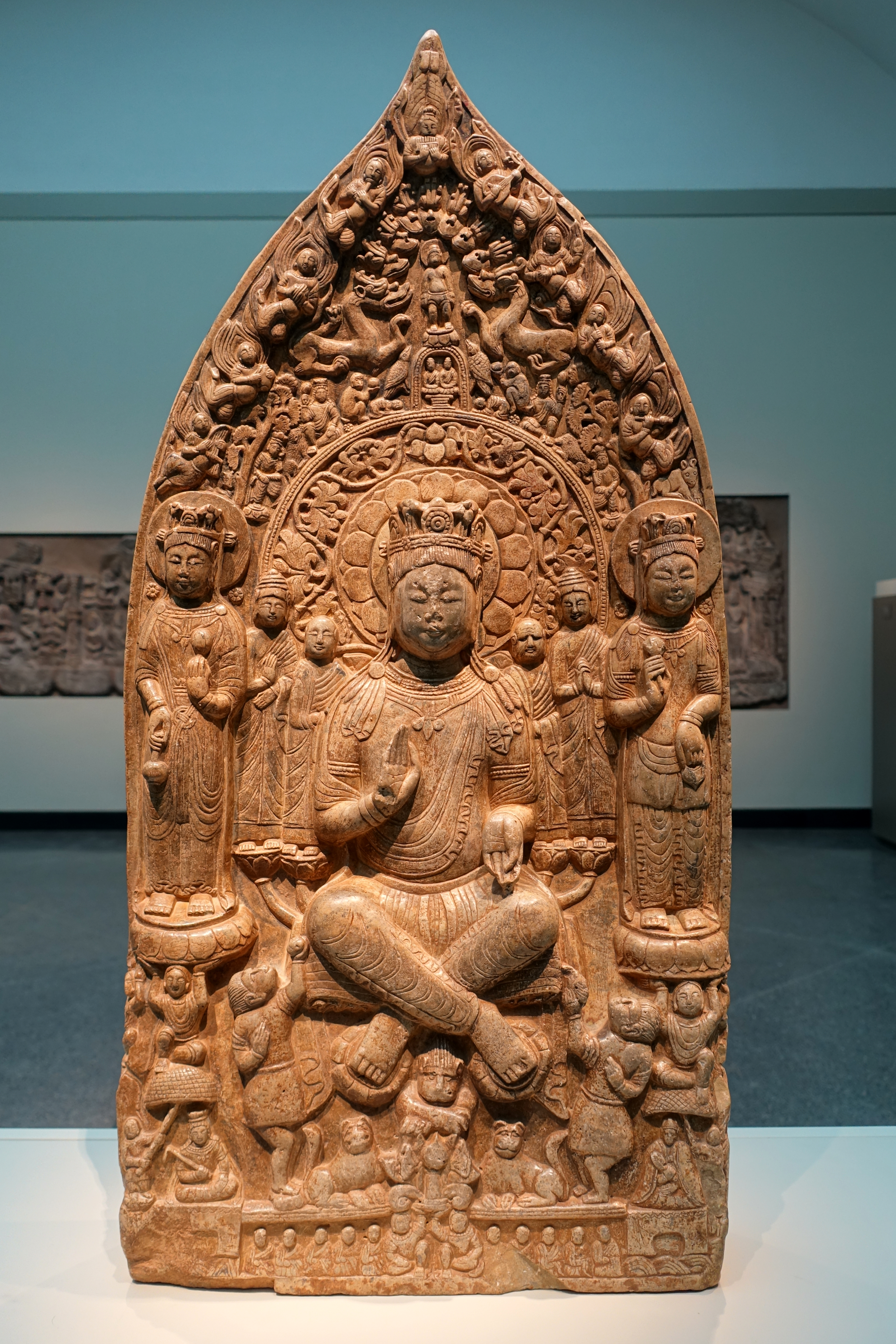
Stele with the Boddhisattva Maitreya (Mile), probably Shaanxi province, 557-581. Freer Gallery of Art

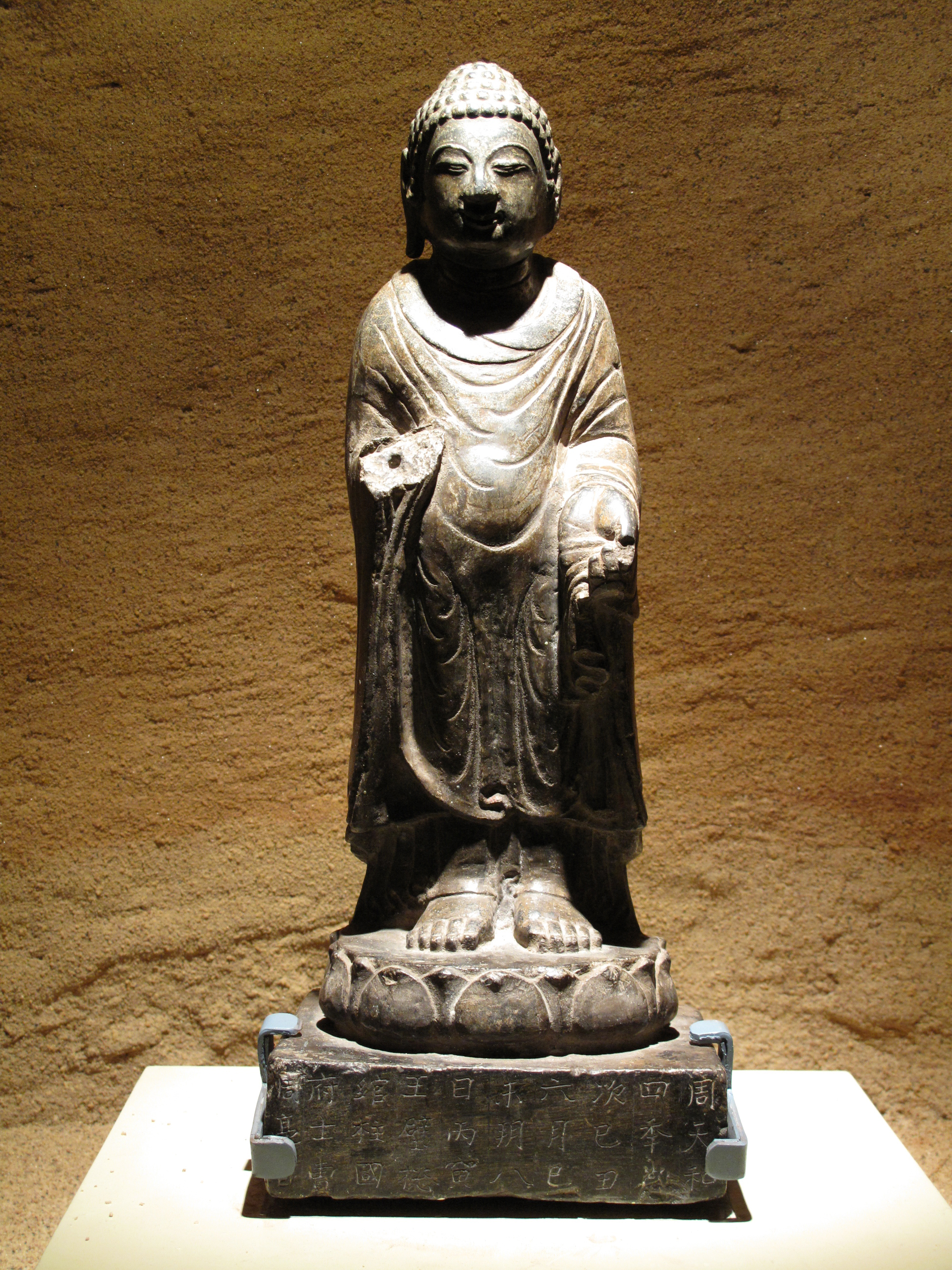
Shakyamuni Buddha, Northern Zhou dynasty, 557-581. Shanxi Museum

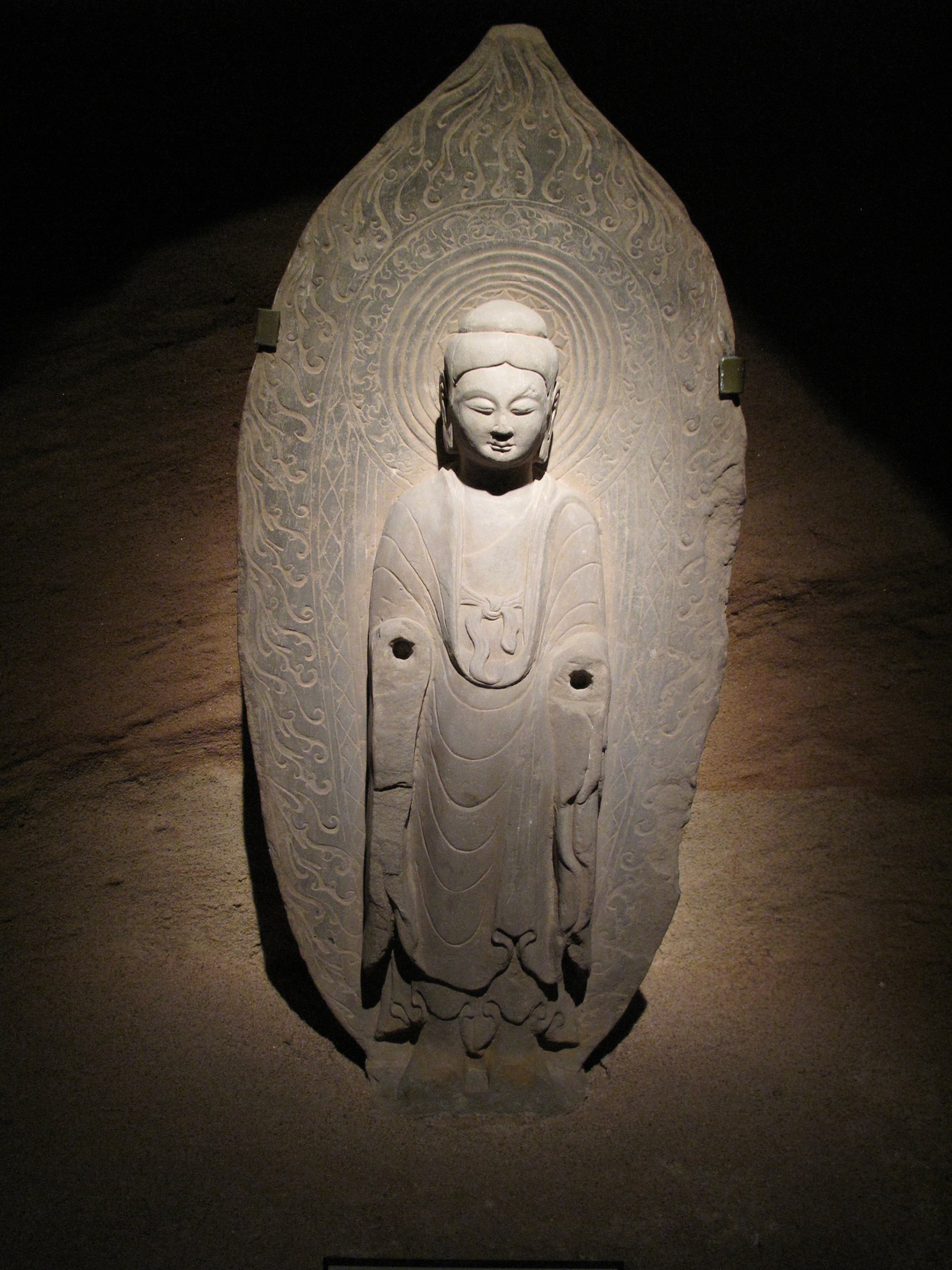
Shakyamuni Buddha. Northern Zhou dynasty, 557-581. Shanxi Museum

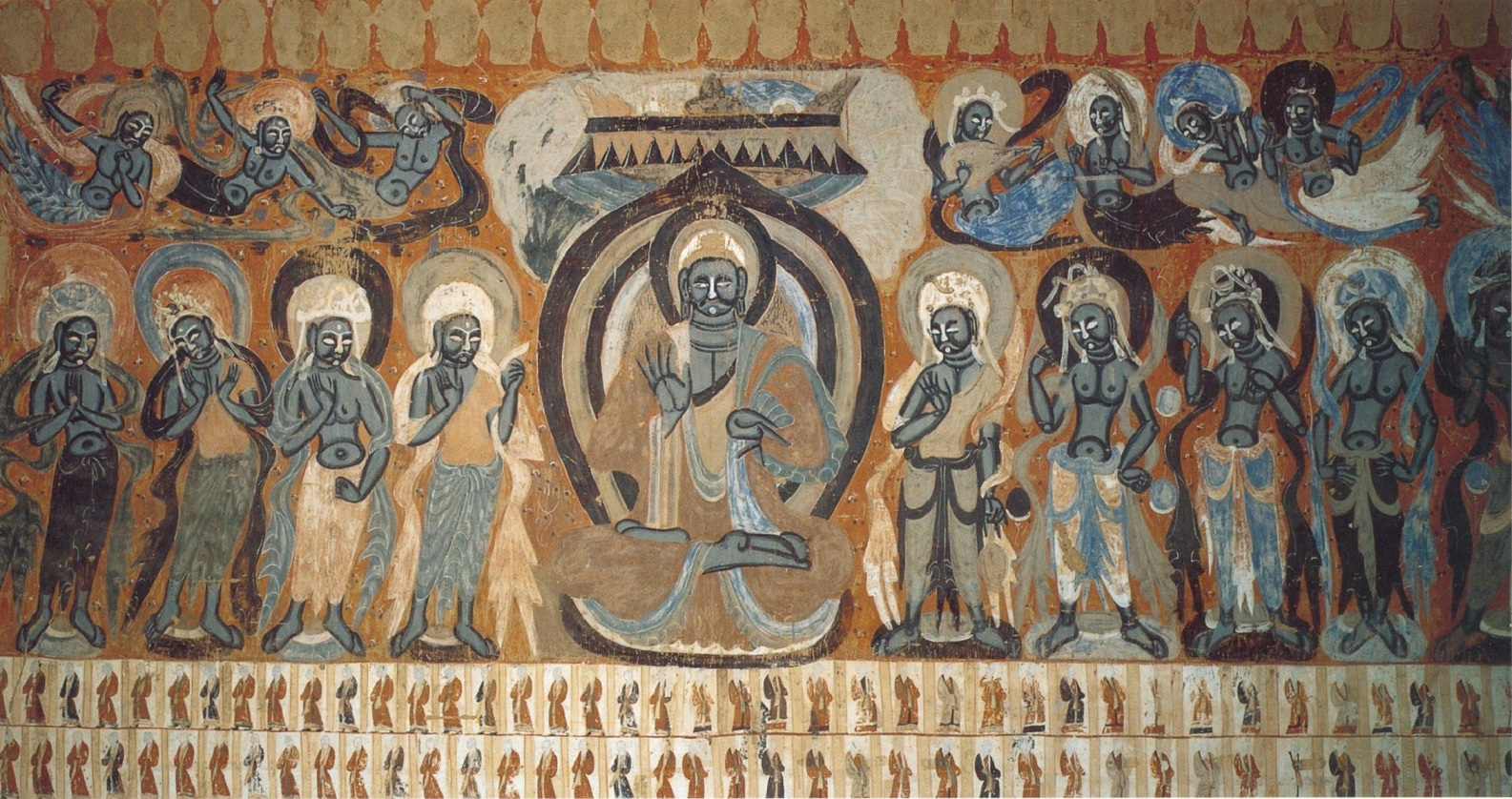
Buddha flanked by bodhisattvas with flying apsaras. Dunhuang mural. Cave 428

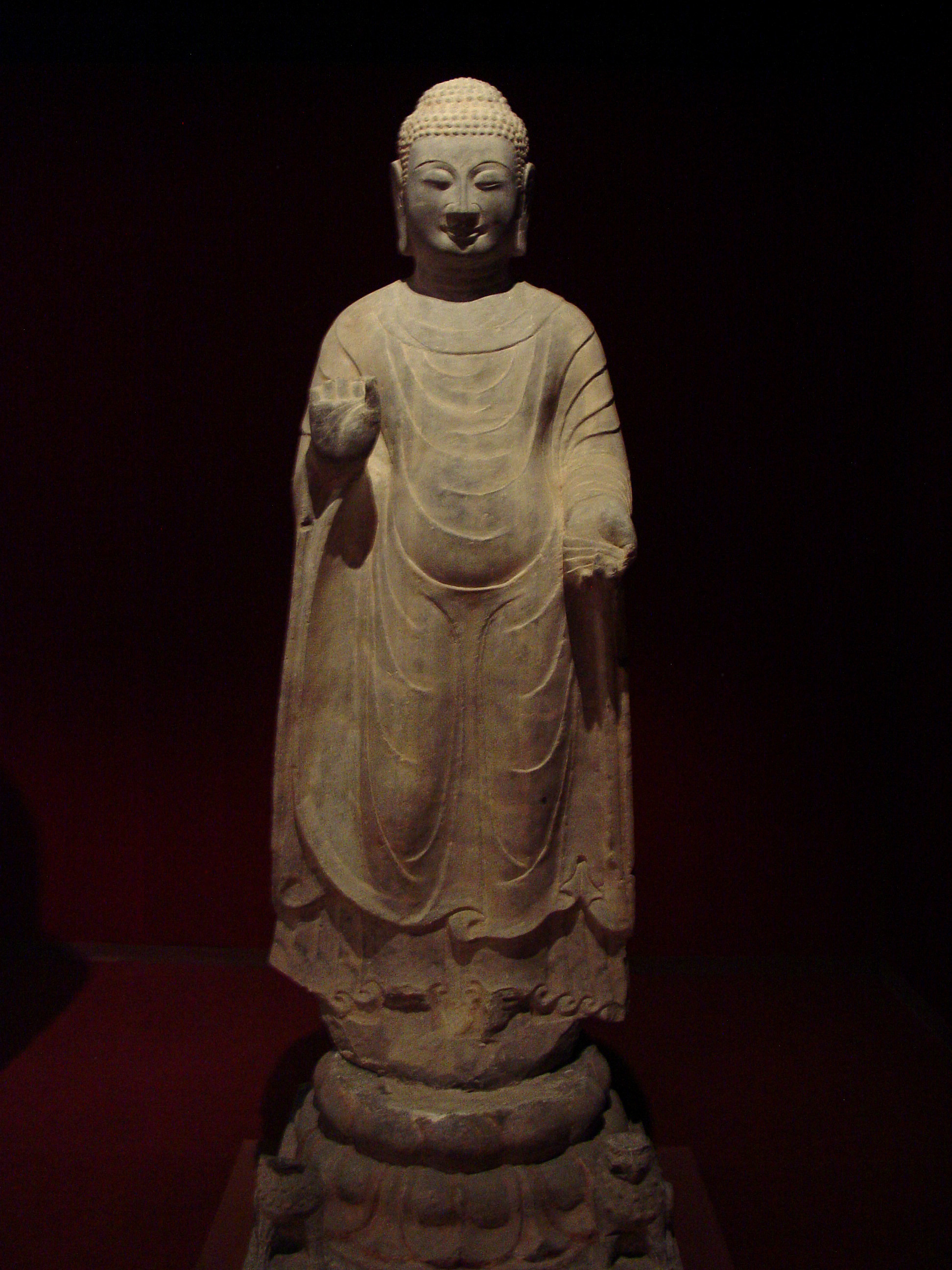
Northern Zhou statue of the Buddha. Xi'an (Shaanxi).

== Foreign relationships ==
=== Contacts with Sogdians and Turks ===
The Tomb of An Jia, a Sogdian merchant (518-579 CE) based in China during the Northern Zhou dynasty, shows the omnipresence of the Turks (at the time of the First Turkic Khaganate), who were probably the main trading partners of the Sogdians in China. The Hephthalites are essentially absent, or possibly showed once as a vassal ruler outside of the yurt of the Turk Qaghan, as they probably had been replaced by Turk hegemony by that time (they were destroyed by the alliance of the Sasanians and the Turks between 556 and 560 CE). In contrast, the Hephthalites are omnipresent in the Tomb of Wirkak, who, although he died at the same time of An Jia was much older at 85: Wirkak may therefore have primarily dealt with the Hephthalites during his younger years. There were also marital alliances: the Northern Zhou Emperor Wu had a Turkic Empress named Ashina.

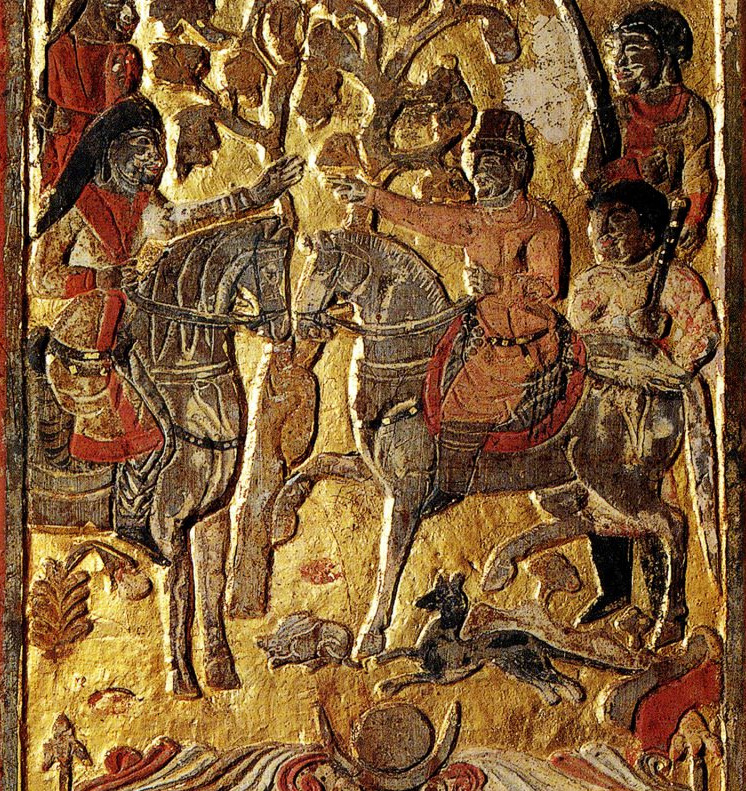
Anjia (right) welcomes a Turkic leader (left, long hair combed in the back).

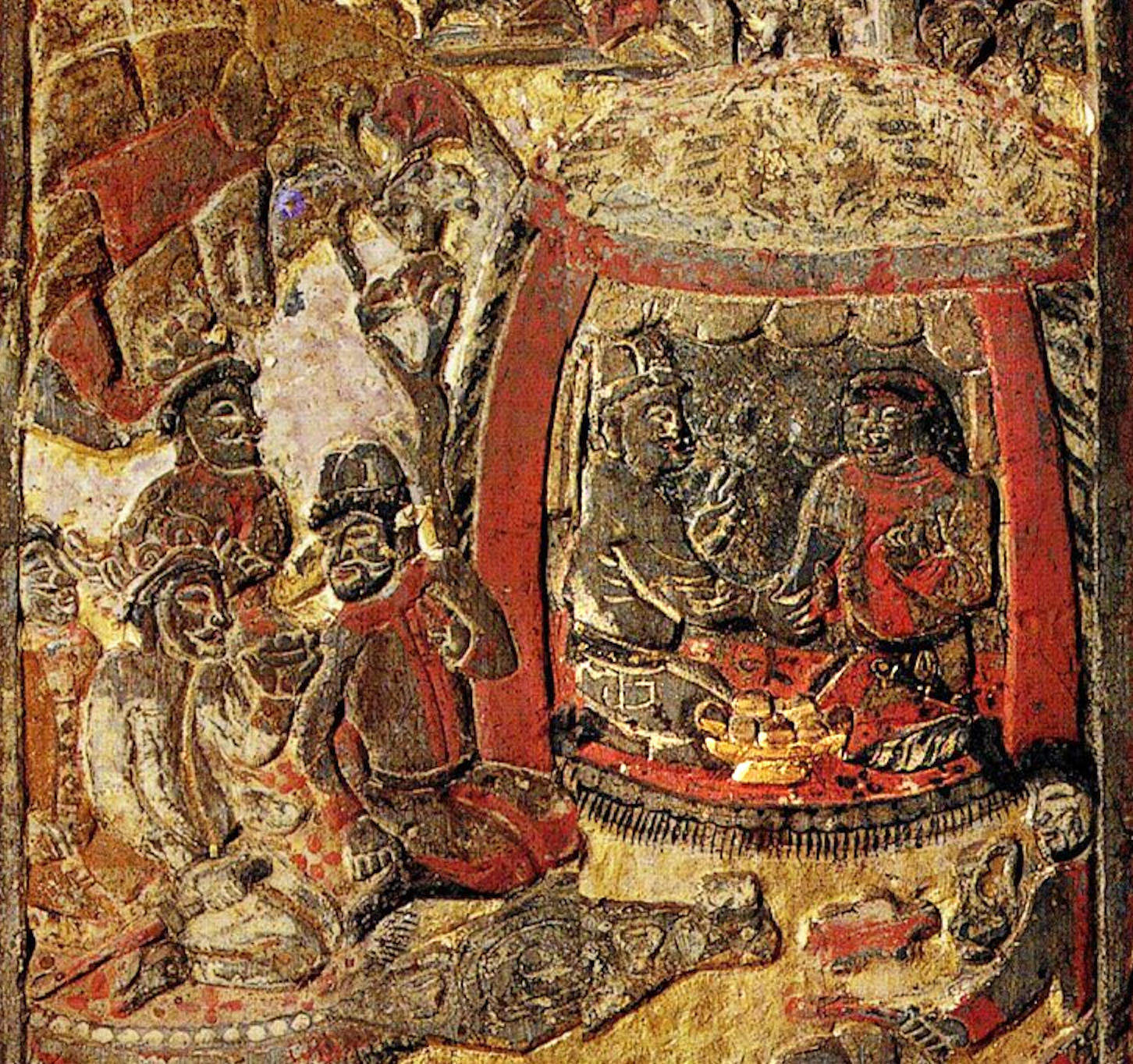
The Sogdian merchant An Jia with a Turkic Chieftain in his yurt.

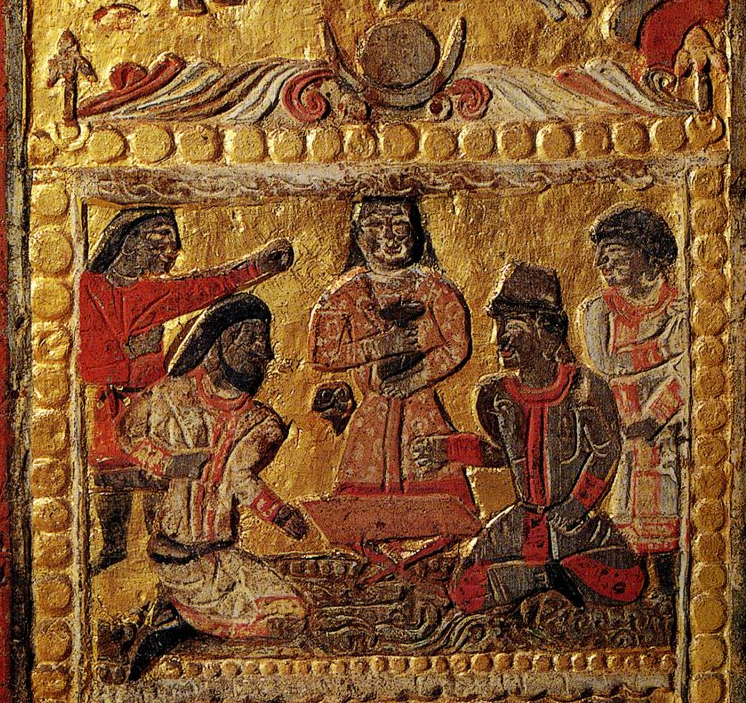
An Jia (right) brokering an alliance with Turks (left).

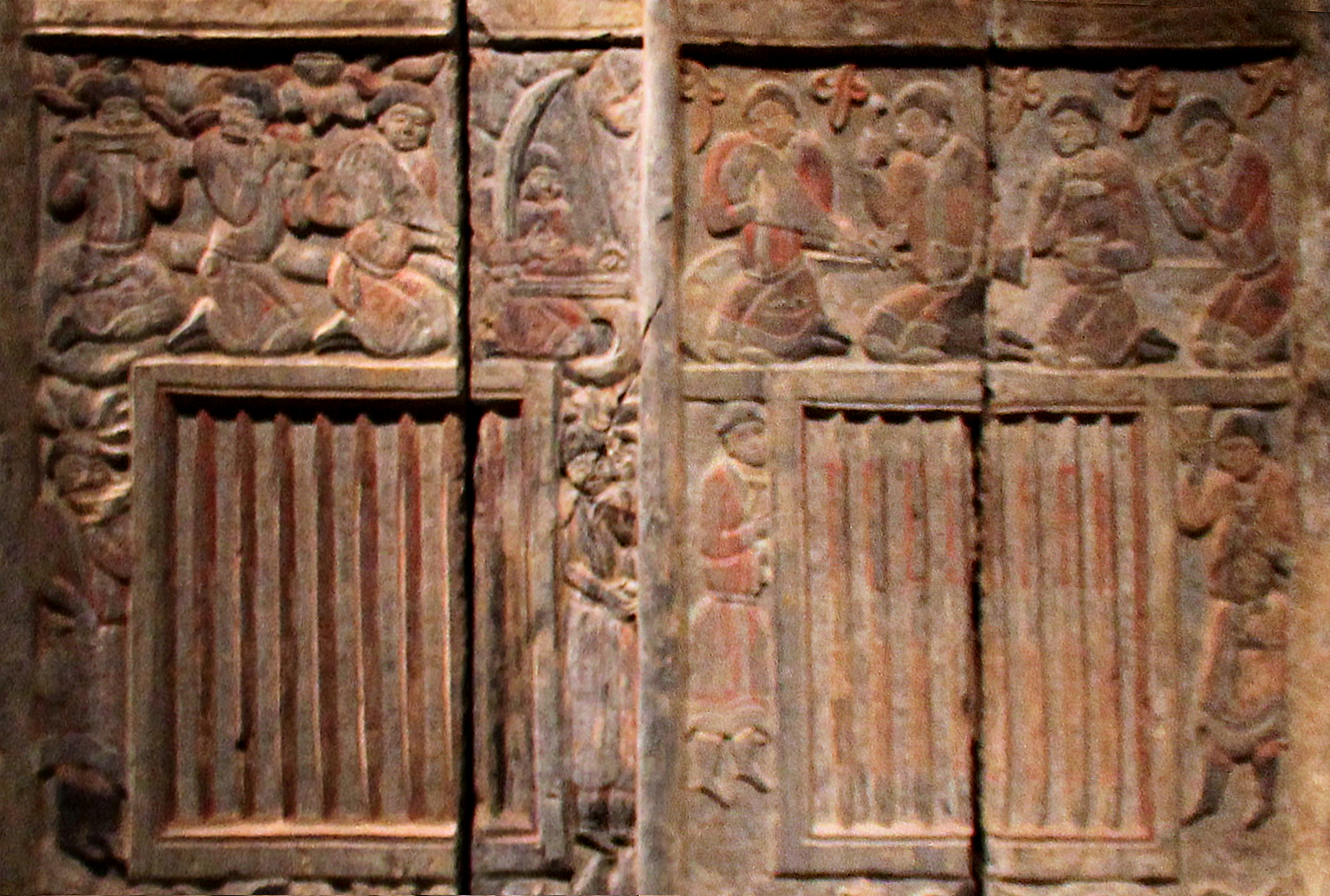
Sogdian musicians on the tomb of Wirkak, Northern Zhou period, Xi'An

=== Empress Ashina ===
Empress Ashina (阿史那皇后, 551–582) was a Turkic empress of the Northern Zhou dynasty and spouse of Emperor Wu of Northern Zhou. She was the daughter of Göktürk ruler Muqan Qaghan. Her tomb was discovered in 1993 in Chenma village, Xianyang. A genetic analysis on her remains was conducted in 2023, finding nearly exclusively Ancient Northeast Asian ancestry (97,7%) next to minor West-Eurasian components (2,7%), confirming an East Asian origin for the Türks.

== Emperors ==
=== List ===
Posthumous name	Personal name	Period of Reigns	Era name
Xiaomin	Yuwen Jue	557	–
Ming, Xiaoming	Yuwen Yu	557–560	Wucheng (武成) 559–560
Wu	Yuwen Yong	561–578	Baoding (保定) 560–565; Tianhe (天和) 566–572; Jiande (建德) 572–578; Xuanzheng (宣政) 578
Xuan	Yuwen Yun	578–579	Dacheng (大成) 579
Jing	Yuwen Chan	579–581 (Note: In 580, after Emperor Xuan's death, the general Yuchi Jiong, believing that the regent Yang Jian was about to seize the throne, rose against Yang and declared a son of Emperor Wu's brother Yuwen Zhao (宇文招) the Prince of Zhao, whose name is lost to history, emperor, but as Yuchi was soon defeated, and nothing further was known about the emperor that he declared, that son of Yuwen Zhao is usually not considered an emperor of Northern Zhou.)	Daxiang (大象) 579–581; Dading (大定) 581

=== Family tree ===
Northern Zhou emperors family tree

Yuwen Gong 宇文肱 (d.526)	Yuan Huai 元懷 （488–517）
Yuwen Hao 宇文顥 (d. 524)	Princess; Fengyi (d. 541)	Yuwen Tai 宇文泰 (507–556)	Emp. Xiaowu of Northern Wei r. 532–535	Dugu Xin 獨孤信; 504–557
Yuwen Hu 宇文護 (513–572)	Yuwen Jue 宇文覺 (542–557); Xiaomin (r. 557)^{1}	Yuwen Xian 宇文憲 545–578	Yuwen Yong 宇文邕 (543–578); Wu (r. 560–578)^{3}	Yuwen Yu 宇文毓 (534–560); Ming (r. 557–560)^{2}	Empress; Dugu 獨孤王后 d.558	Dugu Qieluo 獨孤伽羅; 544–602	Emperor; Wen of Sui r. 581–604	Duchess; Dugu
Yuwen Yun 宇文贇 (559–580); Xuan (r. 578–579)^{4}	Yang Lihua 楊麗華; 561–609	Sui dynasty	Emperor; Gaozu of Tang r. 618–626
Yuwen Yan 宇文衍 (573–581); Jing (r. 579–581)^{5}	Tang dynasty

== See also ==
- List of pre-modern great powers
- Monarchy of China
