= Tomb of Li Dan =

Northern Zhou period (557-581 CE) funeral monument

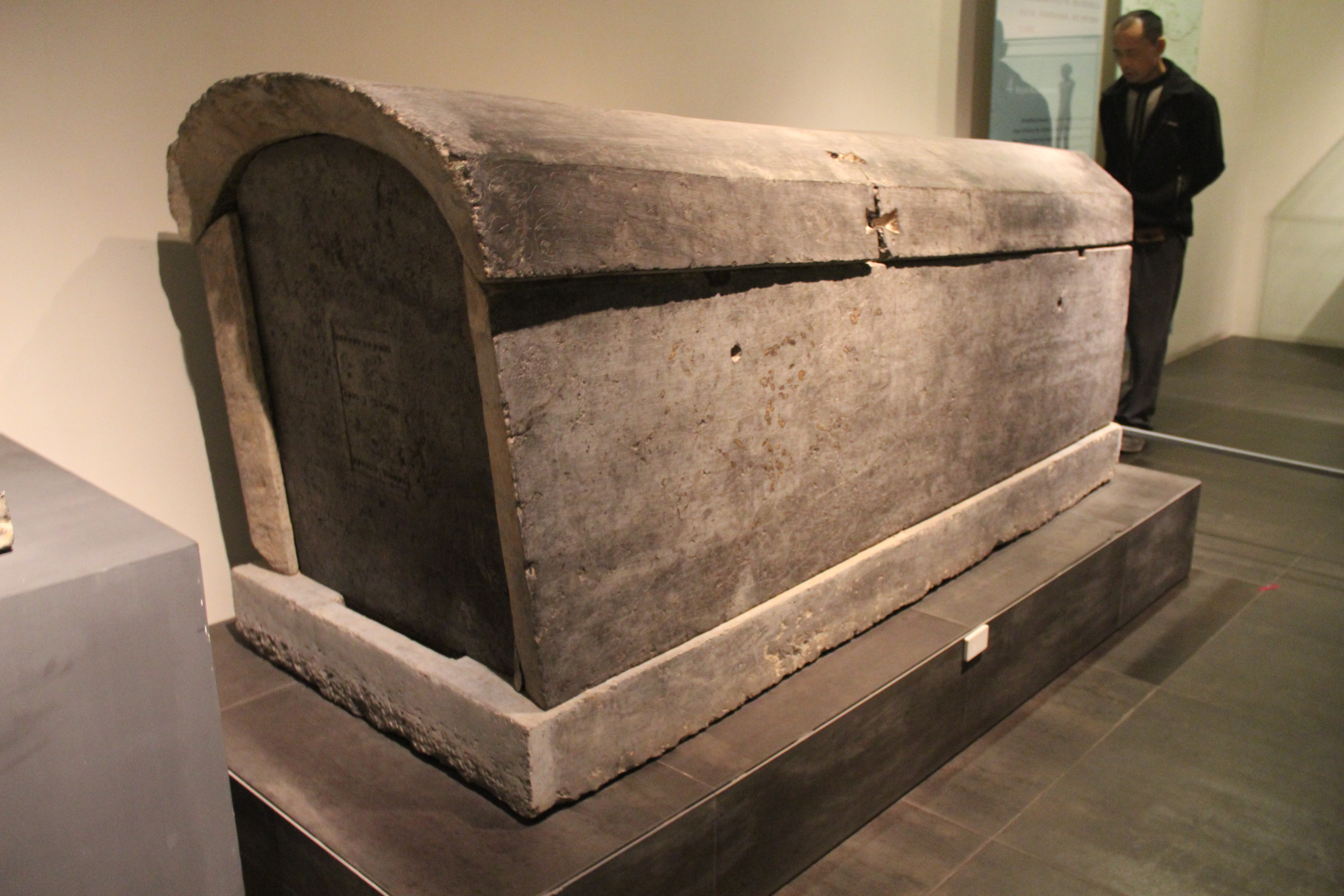
- Tomb of Li Dan, Xi'an City Museum.
- Created: 564 CE
- Discovered: September 2005

Location

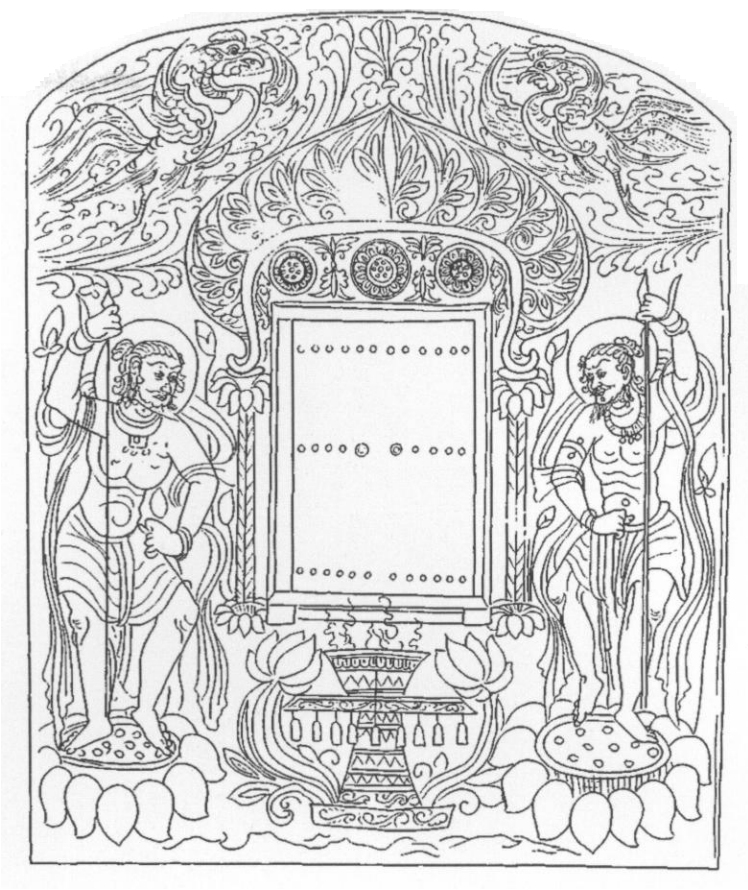
Decorations at the entrance of the tomb of Li Dan, line drawing. It represents two haloed guards in non-Chinese style, and a central fire altar, which could be Zoroastrian.

The Tomb of Li Dan (Chinese: 李诞墓; pinyin: Lǐ Dàn mù), is a Northern Zhou period (557-581 CE) funeral monument to a foreigner named "Lǐ Dàn" (李诞) in the Chinese epitaph. The tomb was excavated in the east of the ancient city of Xi'an, capital of the Western Wei (534-557 CE) and Northern Zhou (557-581 CE) dynasties, in the same area where the tombs of Kangye, Anjia and Shijun were discovered. The tomb with its epitaph are now located in the collections of the Xi'an City Museum. Lǐ Dàn died in 564 CE.

== Epitaph ==
According to the epitaph, Lǐ Dàn was a "Brahmin" (Chinese: 婆罗门 Póluómén). He descended from an honourable family, and his grandfather had once been a tribal leader. Between 520 and 525 CE, he and his family migrated from Jibin (area of Gandhara in northwestern Pakistan) to China, and received the favours of Emperor Taizu (507–556 CE). Lǐ Dàn died at the age of 59 in his home in Xi'an, in 564 CE. He received posthumously the title of "Prefect of the Hán Prefecture" ("邯州刺史") from the Emperor. His son Panti (槃提) wrote the epitaph.

The epitaph reads:

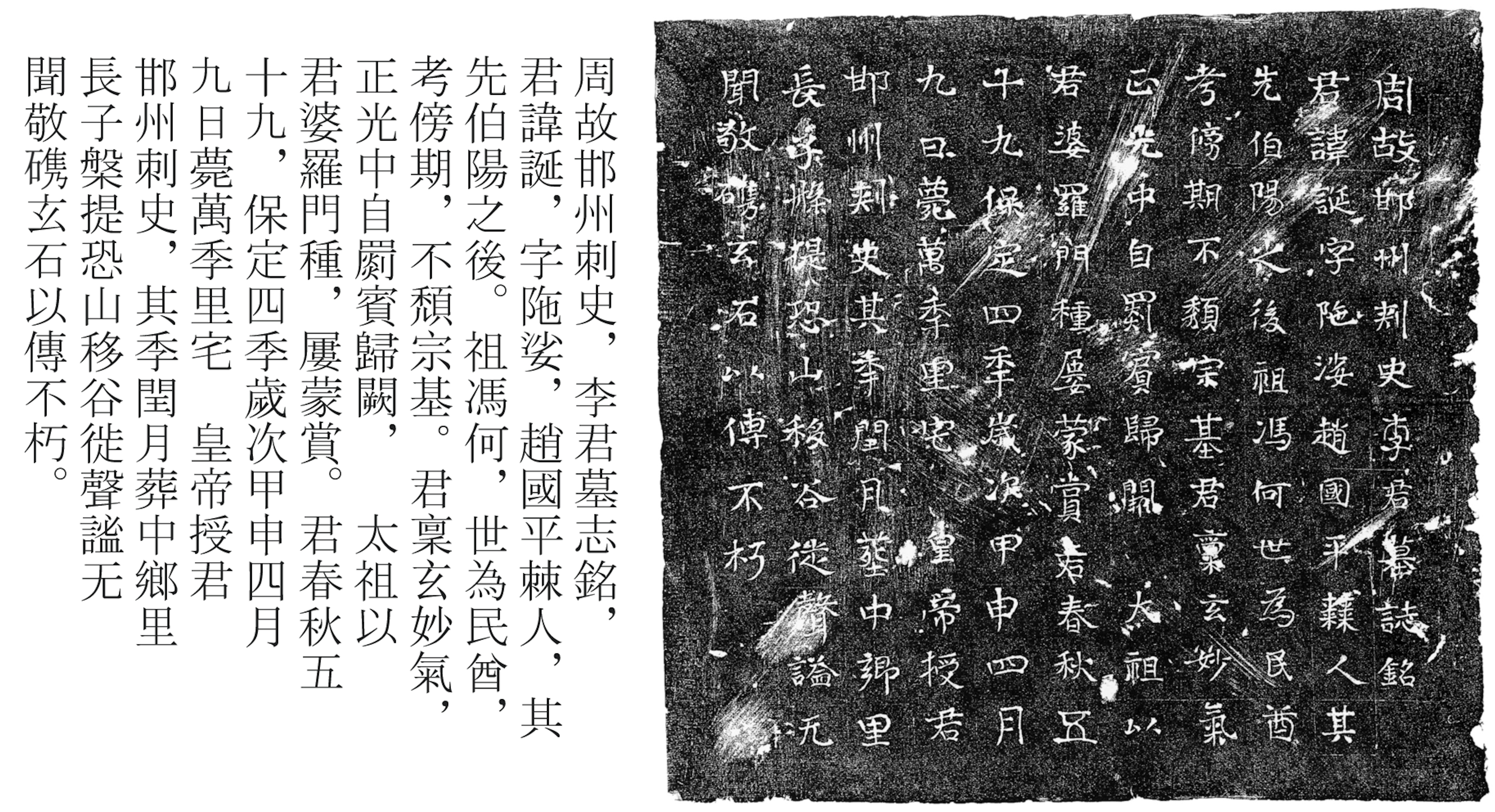
Epitaph of Li Dan

"Epitaph of Li Dan, also named Li Tuosuo, deceased Prefect of the Province of Han, who lived in Pingji, Zhao country, descendant of Bo Yang. His grandfather was Feng He, a tribal ruler, who worked hard and maintained the standing of his lineage. The deceased was an honorable man, who traveled from Jibin to the Imperial court during the Zhengguang era (520–525 CE). Because he was a Brahmin, Emperor Taizu offered him plenty of gifts and rewards. The deceased died at the age of 59, on April 9th, in the 4th year of the Baoding era (564 CE), year of the Wood Monkey, at his home in Wanjili. The Emperor gave him the title of "Prefect of the Province of Han", and he was buried in the leap month of that same year in Zhonxiangli. His elder son Panti, fearing cataclisms, and afraid the name of his father might be forgotten, reverently wrote this inscription on a black stone, so that his story can be transmitted unblemished."

— Epitaph of Li Dan, written by his son Panti in 564 CE.

== Tomb ==
Li Dan's tomb was discovered in September 2005 by Xi'an Institute of Cultural Relics Protection and Archaeology in the northern suburbs of Xi'an. The tomb was a single arc-square brick chambered tomb, with a long sloping passage and tunnel, reflective of traditional Chinese tombs of the Northern Zhou period. Enclosed by a brick wall, it had a stone gateway, behind which the stone coffin was placed. The coffin contained two skeletons, of a man and a woman, wrapped in three layers of textiles, accompanied by a Byzantine gold coin Justinian I, (527-565 CE) inside the mouth of the woman. Traces of pigments suggest that the inside walls of the tomb were originally painted.

The coffin is decorated with fine incised carvings representing traditional Chinese cosmology. The motifs also included two haloed guards in non-Chinese style, and a fire altar, which could be Zoroastrian.

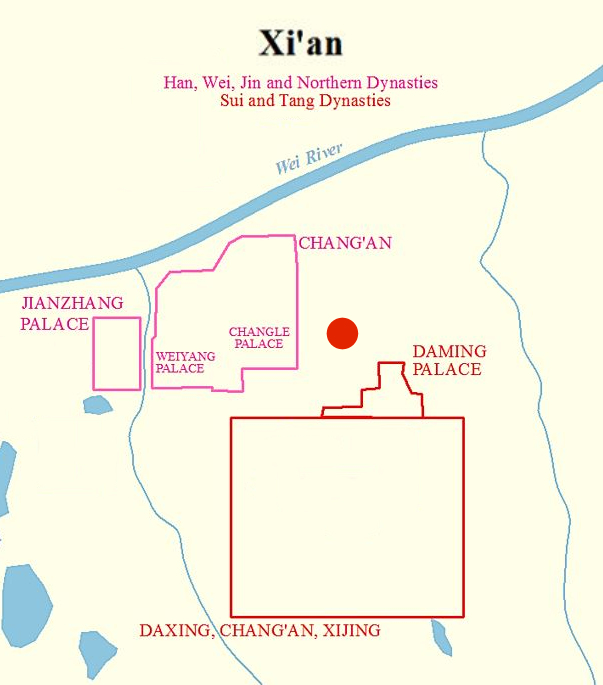
Xi'an, location of the tomb of Lidan (red dot).

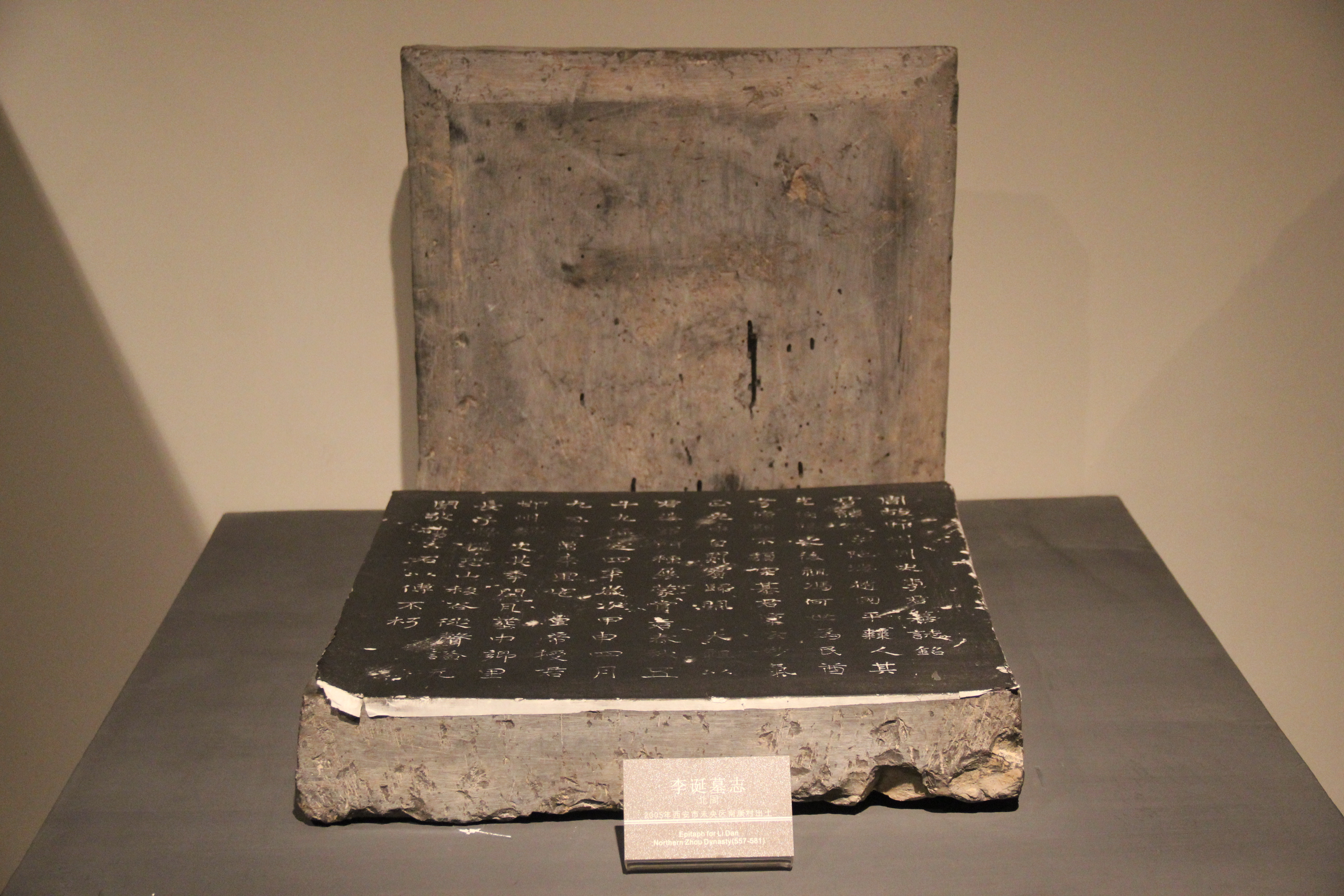
Epitaph from the tomb of Li Dan.

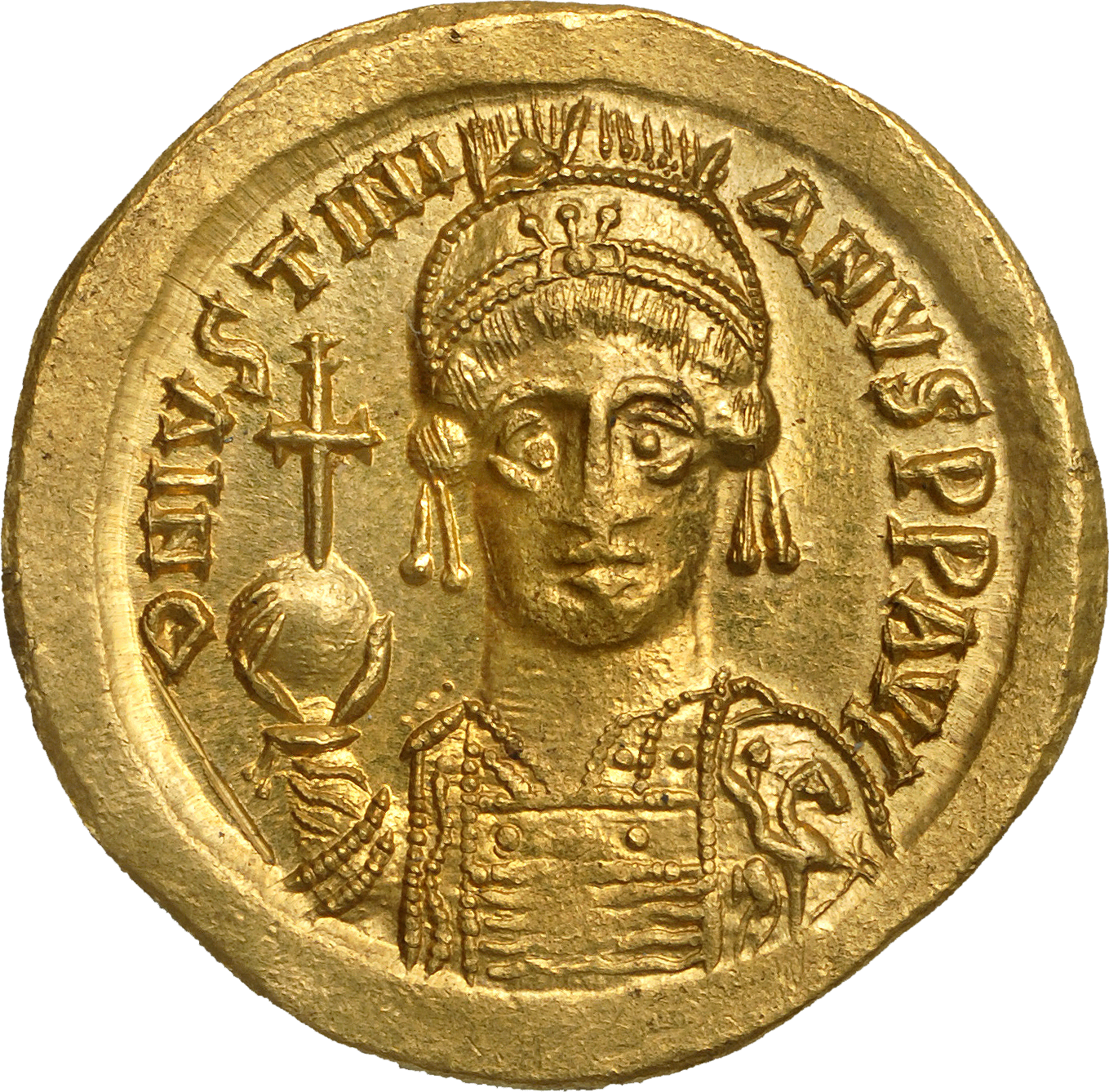
Type of the gold coin of Justinian I discovered in the tomb.

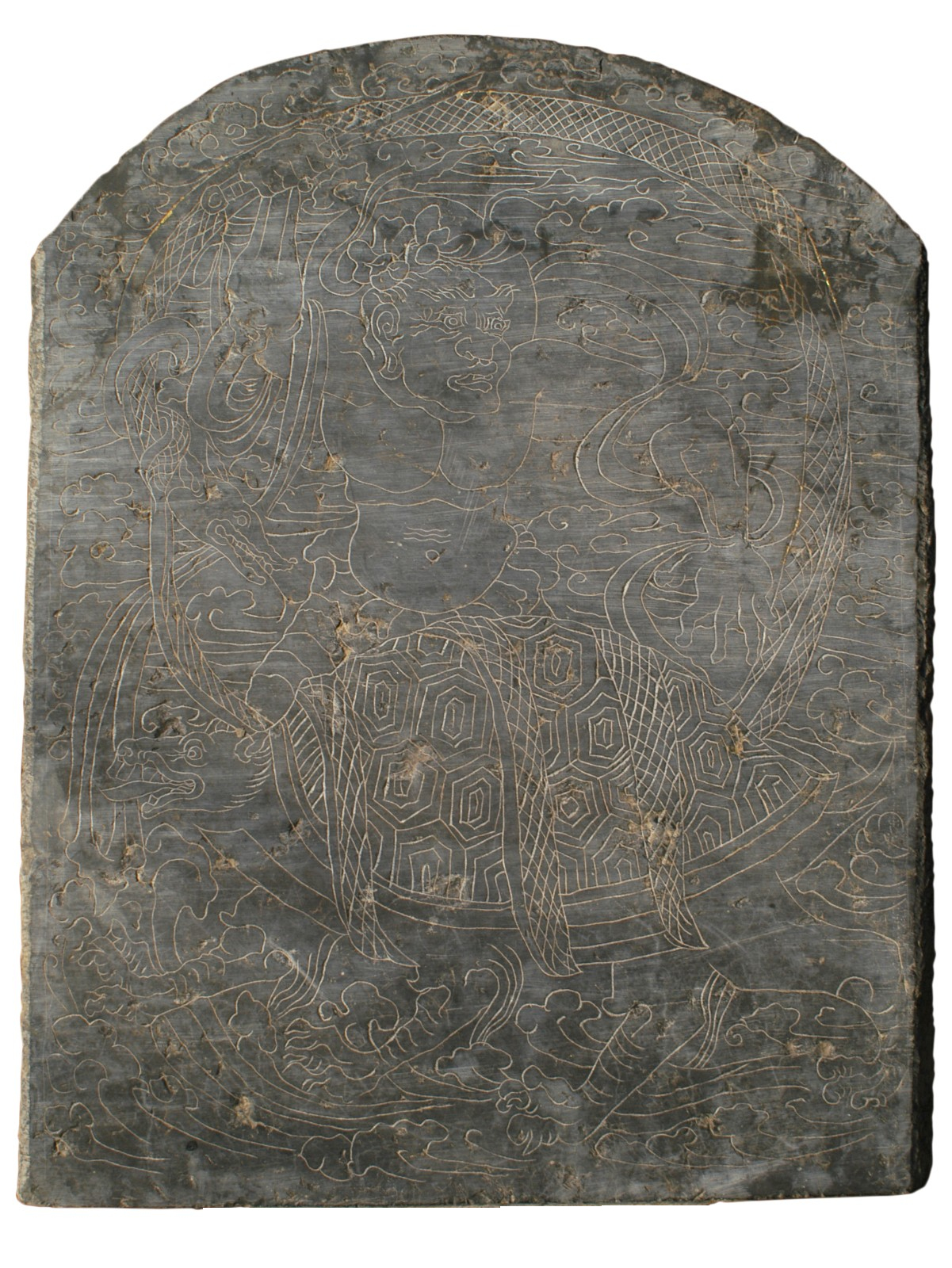
Decorated back panel: the traditional tortoise Xuanwu, with a haloed deity holding a sword.

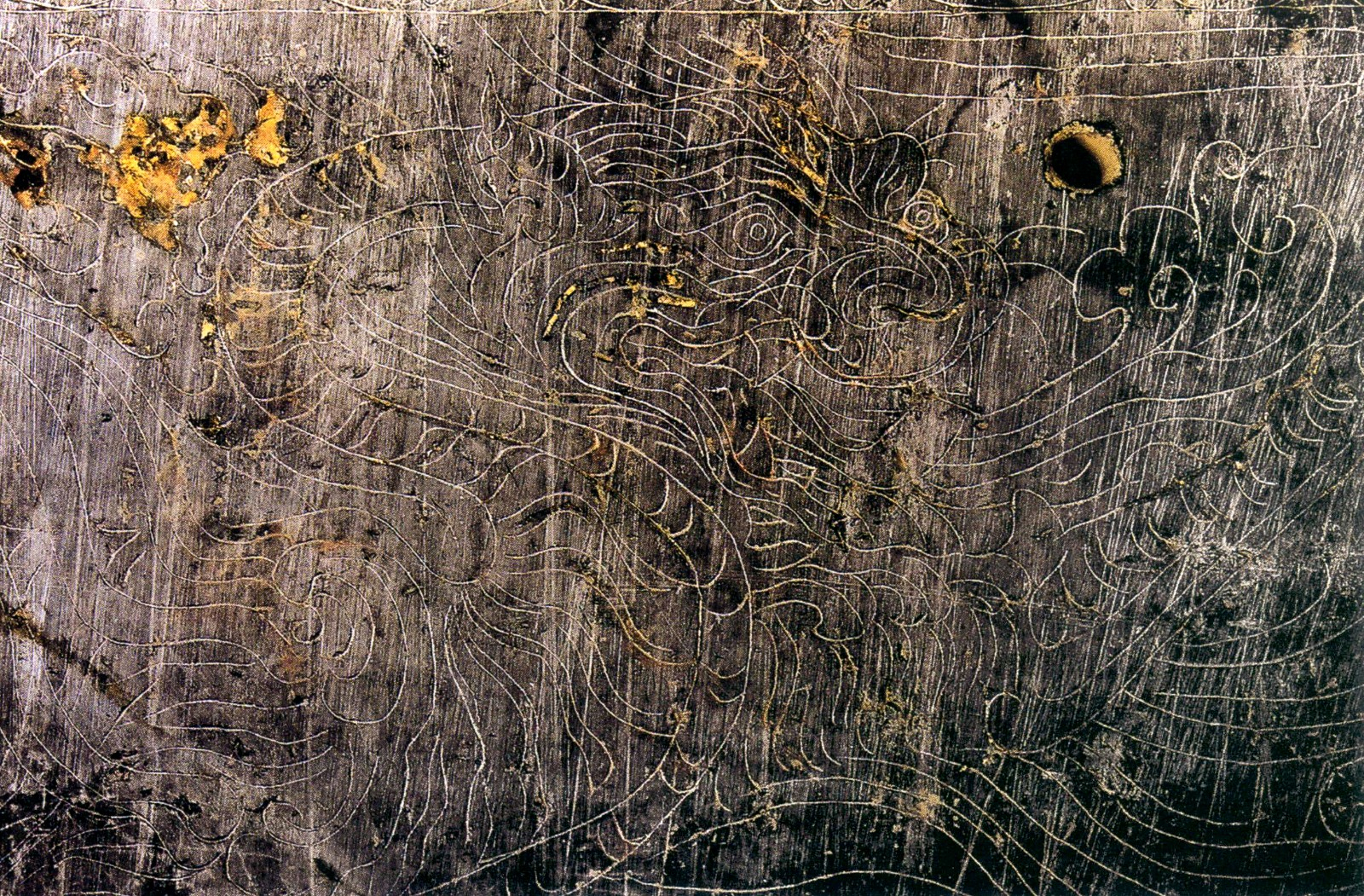
Side panel decorated with a white dragon.

== Genetic Analysis ==
In 2025, a groundbreaking archaeogenetic study led by researchers from Fudan University was published in the Journal of Archaeological Science: Reports, providing the first genomic evidence of a cross-border couple between South Asia and East Asia during the 6th century.

Scientists extracted high-coverage genome-wide data from the skeletal remains of both Li Dan and his wife. The genetic analysis resolved long-standing historical skepticism regarding the conflicting claims in Li Dan's tomb epitaph:

- Li Dan: The genomic sequencing revealed that Li Dan possessed a distinct northern South Asian ancestry, showing a heavy genetic affinity to modern South Asian Brahmin populations. This confirmed the validity of his biological Brahmin status and verified the epitaph's description of his foreign heritage.
- His Wife: In contrast, genetic analysis of his wife's remains showed an ancestry entirely native to Northern China, displaying genetic profiles closely related to ancient Yellow River farmers and proving that the family had engaged in elite intermarriage upon arriving in China.

The study highlights a conscious dual-identity strategy managed by his son, Panti, who authored the epitaph. By undergrounding the biological truth of their Brahmin heritage within the sealed tomb, while publicly adopting the prestigious, fabricated lineage of the Chinese Li clan of Longxi, the family successfully mitigated the sociopolitical risks of being foreign residents during a volatile period of regional cataclysms. This allowed them to construct a secure, fully integrated elite Chinese identity for subsequent generations while preserving their actual history in stone.

== Similar coffins ==
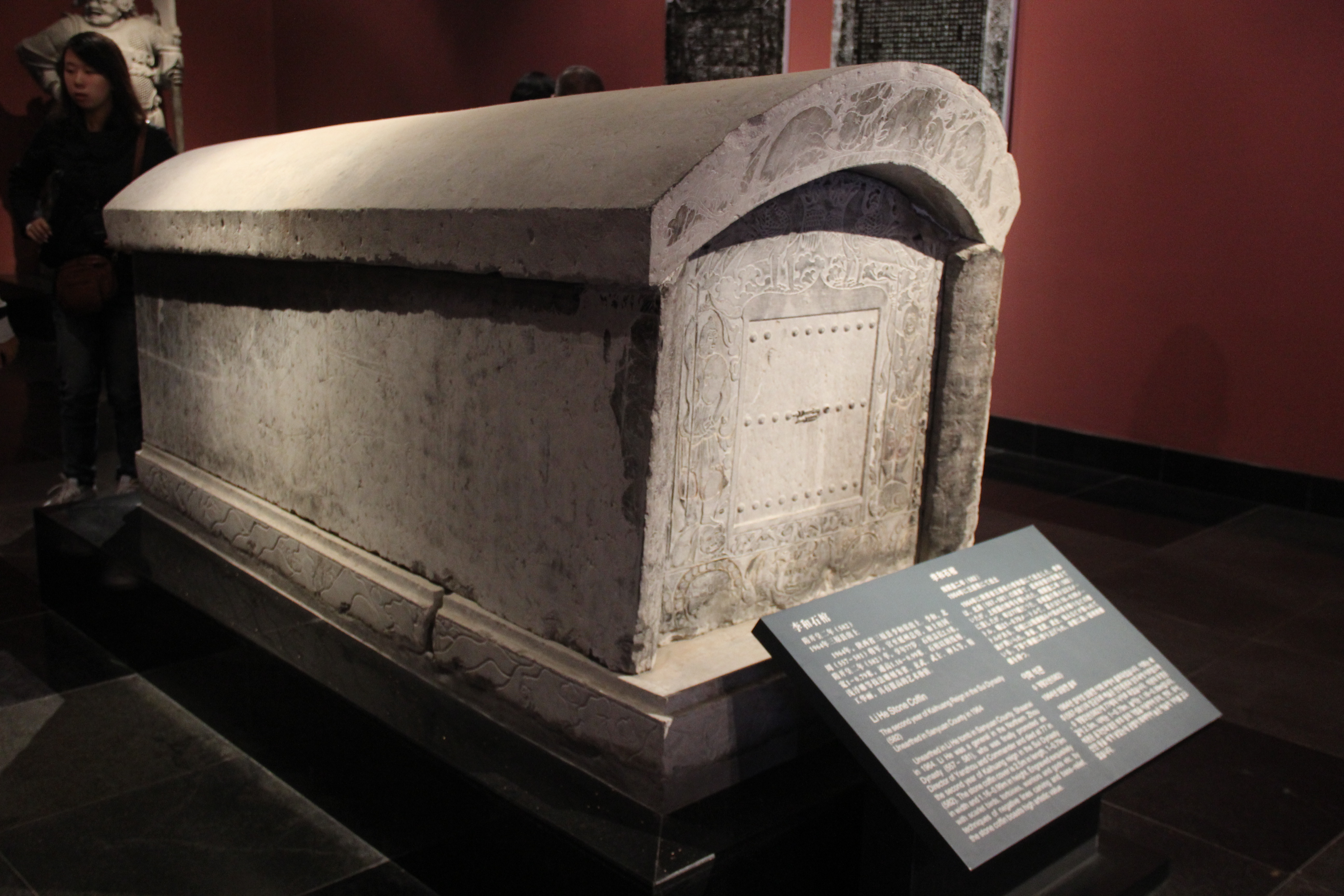
Sarcophagus of Li He, a Northern Zhou general, of similar design (李和墓, 505–582).

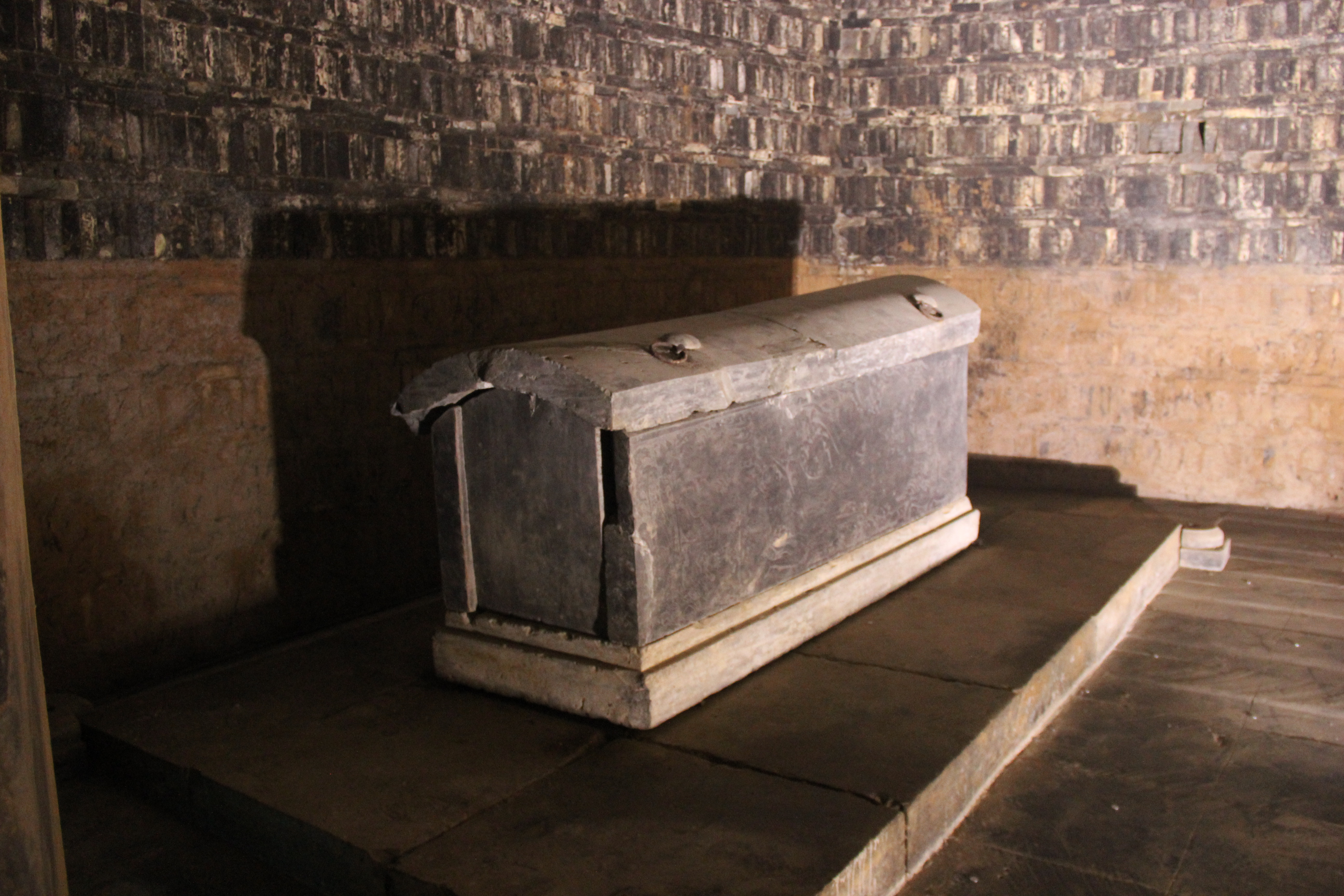
Sarcophagus of Emperor Xuanwu (483-515 CE).

== See also ==
- Sogdian tombs in China
