= Emperor Shengwu =

Emperor Shengwu may refer to:

- Tuoba Jiefen (fl. c. 190s), Xianbei leader
- An Lushan (703–757), emperor of Yan whose only era name was Shengwu
- Liu Zhiqian (died 894), father of Southern Han's founding emperor Liu Yan
- Genghis Khan (c. 1162–1227), grandfather of Yuan dynasty's founding emperor Kublai

== See also ==
- Emperor Shenwu (disambiguation)
