= Tomb of Li Shou =

GRAVE OF EMPEROR GAOZU'S COUSIN LI SHOU

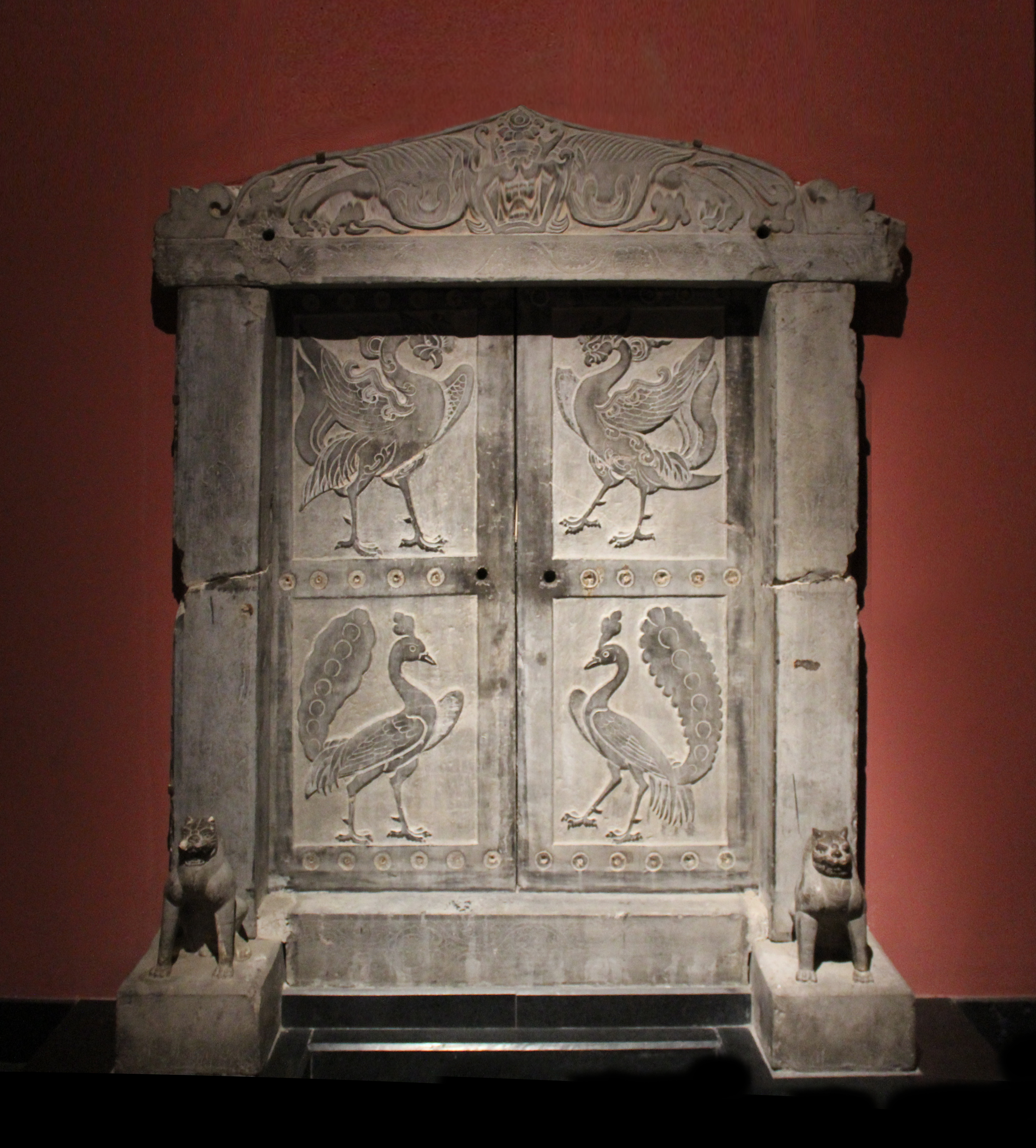
- Gate of the tomb of Li Shou, 630 CE. Beilin Museum, Xi'an
- Created: 630 CE
- Discovered: Sanyuan County, about 40 kilometers north of Xi'an
- Present location: Beilin Museum, Xi'an

The Tomb of Li Shou (Chinese: 李壽墓, Lĭ Shòu mù, Li Shou was also named Li Shentong (李神通), 557-630 CE) was a tomb with slopes access and vertical shafts dating to 630 CE during the early Tang dynasty. Li Shou was a cousin of Emperor Gaozu of Tang.

The tomb was excavated in 1973 in Sanyuan County, about 40 kilometers north of Xi'an, Shaanxi Province, and contained numerous artifacts, including glass utensils. The sarcophagus is now located in the Beilin Museum, Xi'an, including an epitaph in the shape of a tortoise shell.

== Gallery ==
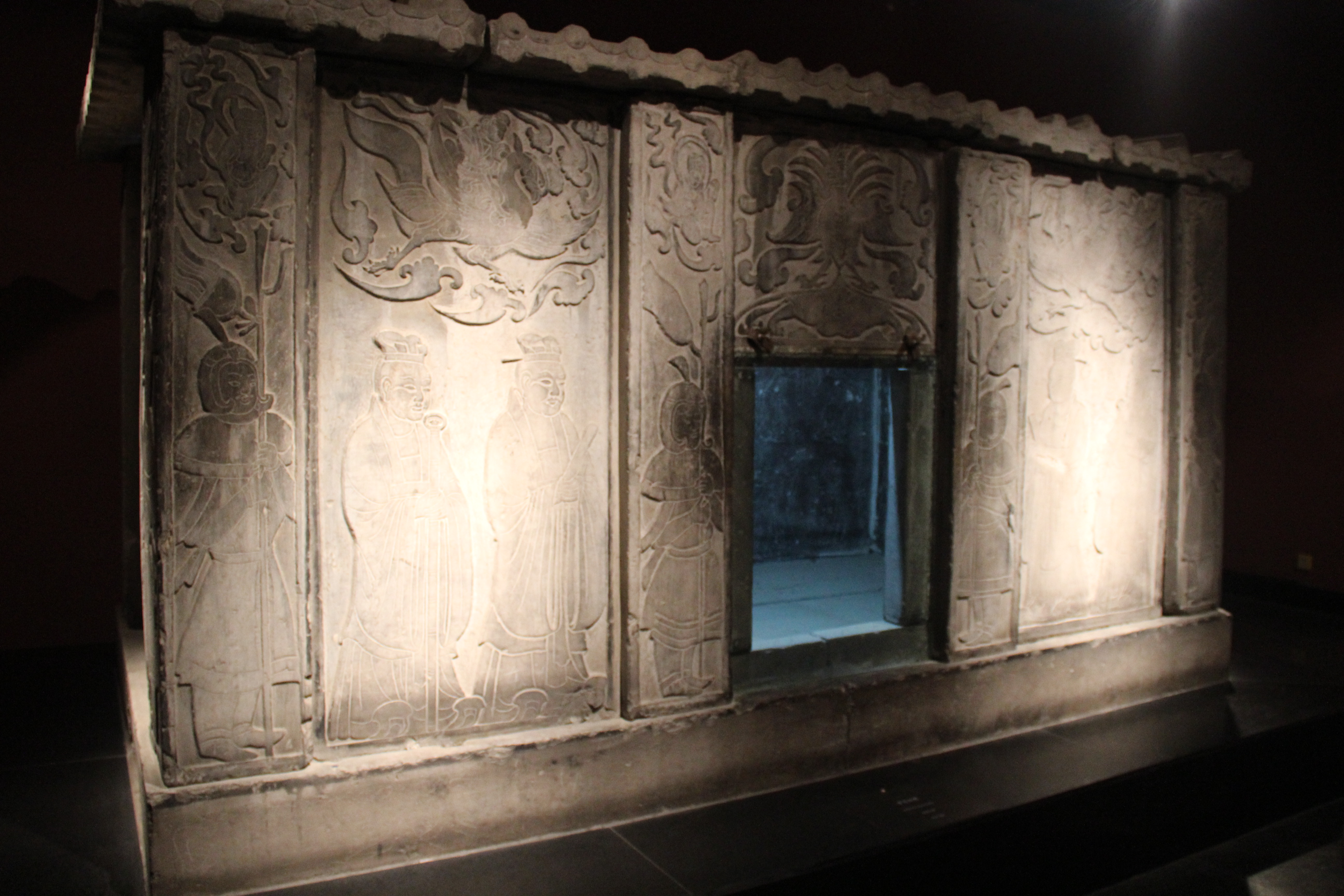
Stone sarcophagus of the Tomb of Li Shou, 630 CE. Beilin Museum, Xi'an

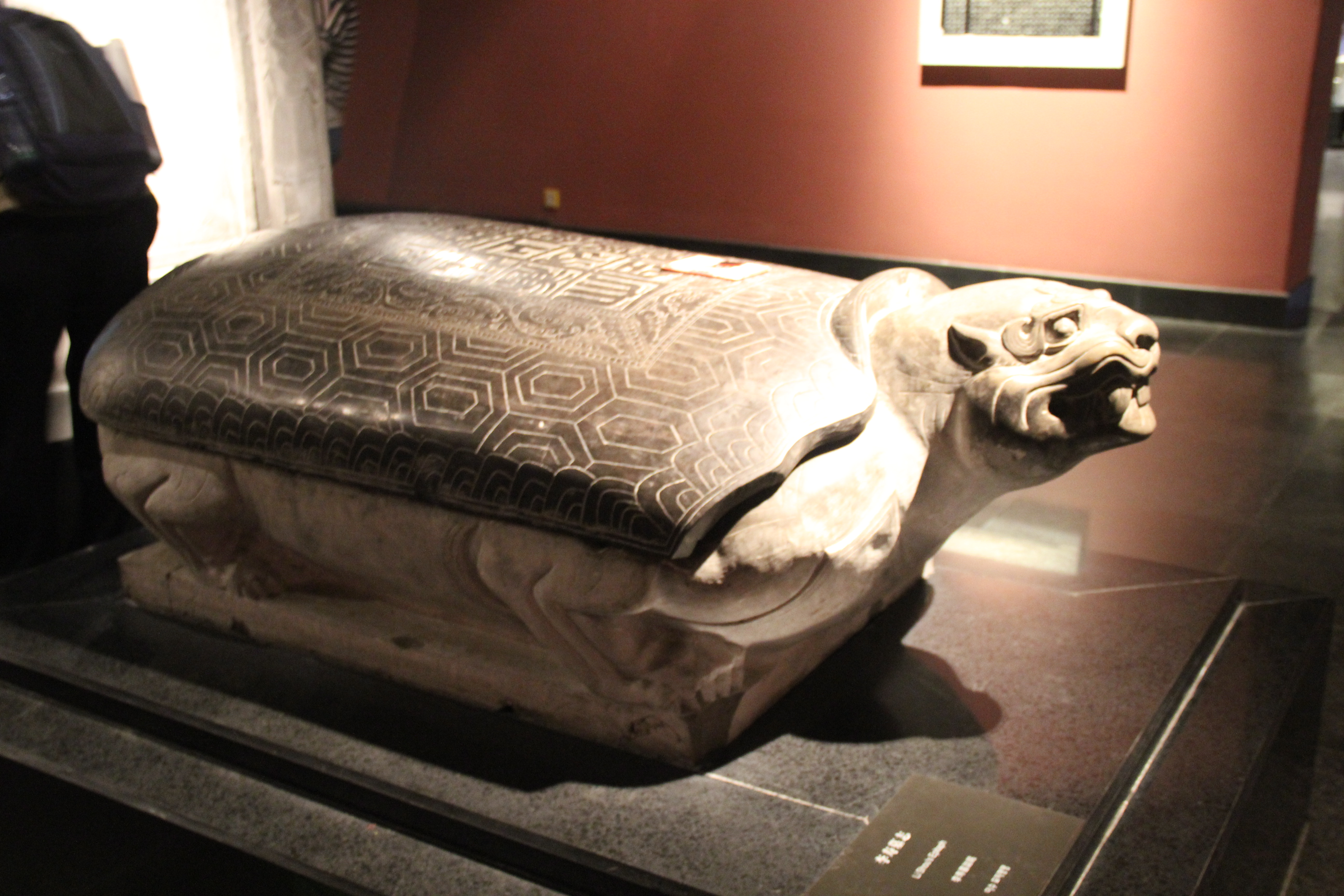
Tortoise, the shell of which works as the epitaph

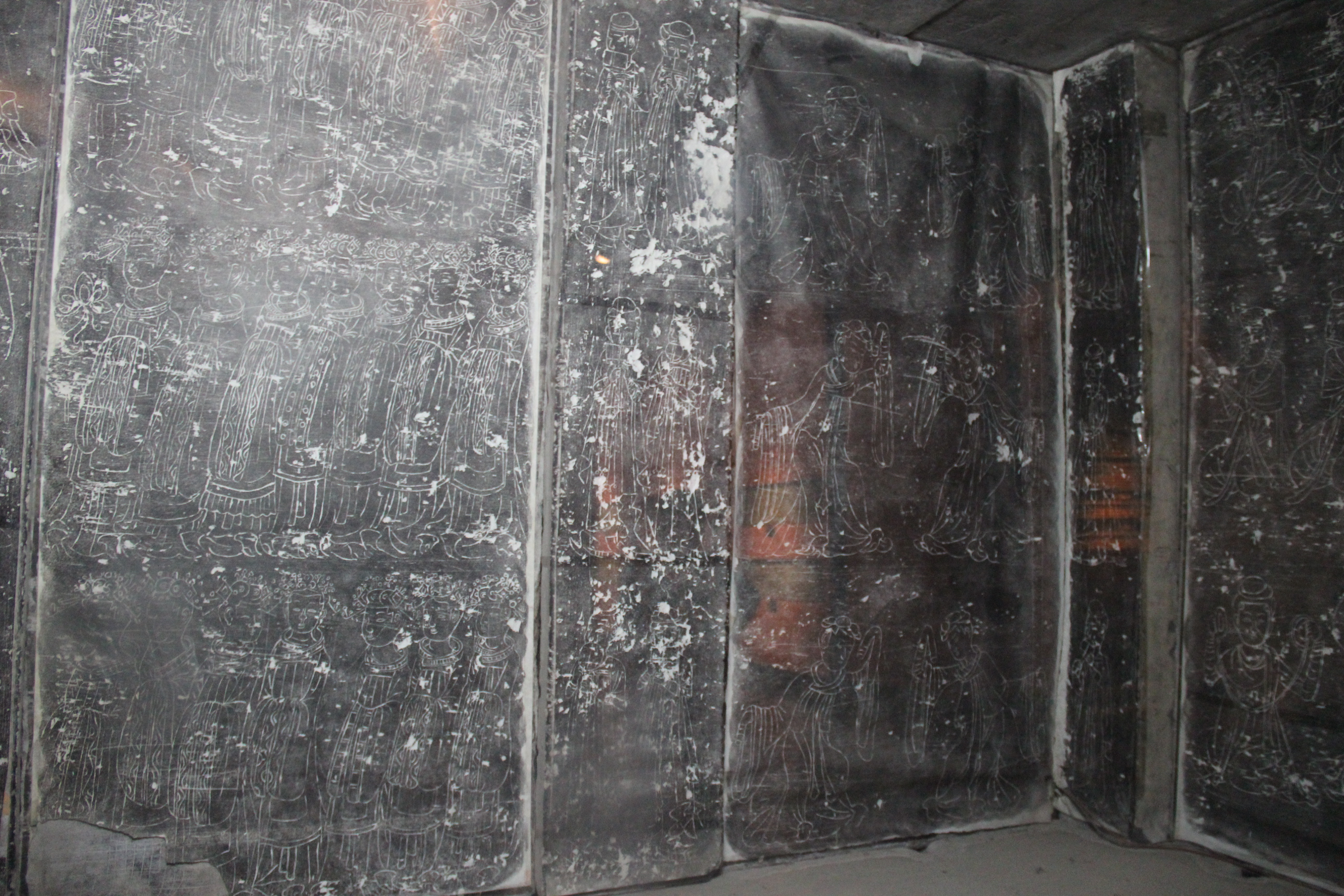
Engravings with attendants inside the sarcophagus

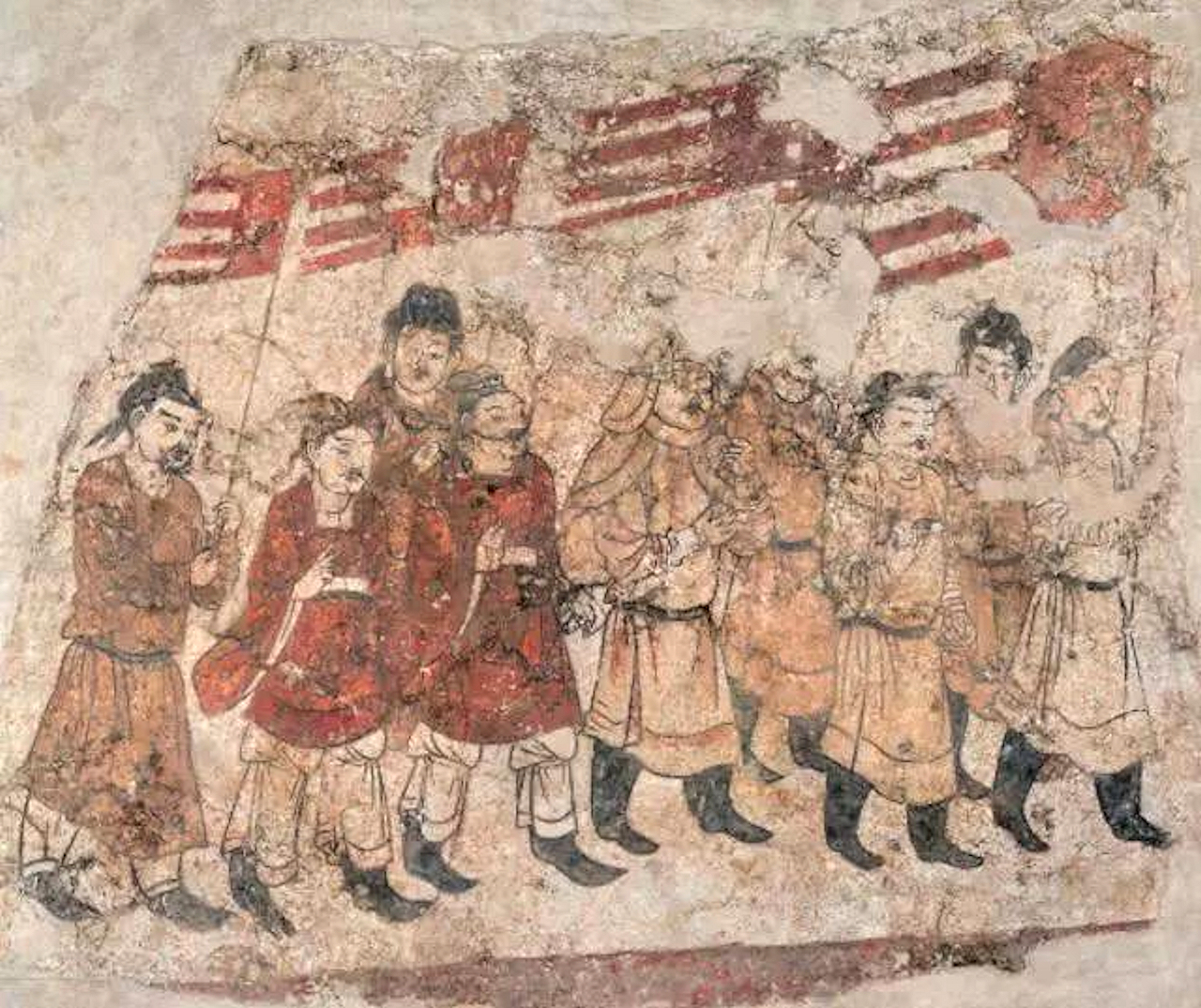
One of the paintings from the tomb walls

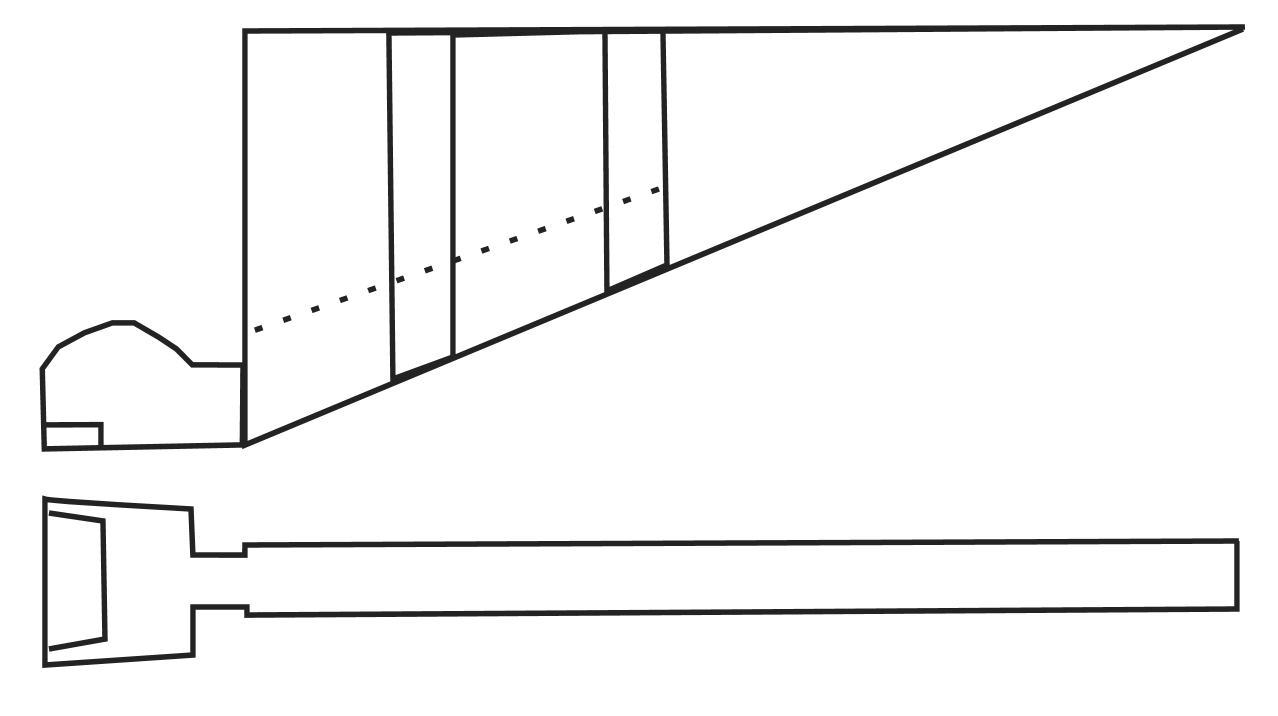
Tomb type, as seen in the Tomb of Li Xian

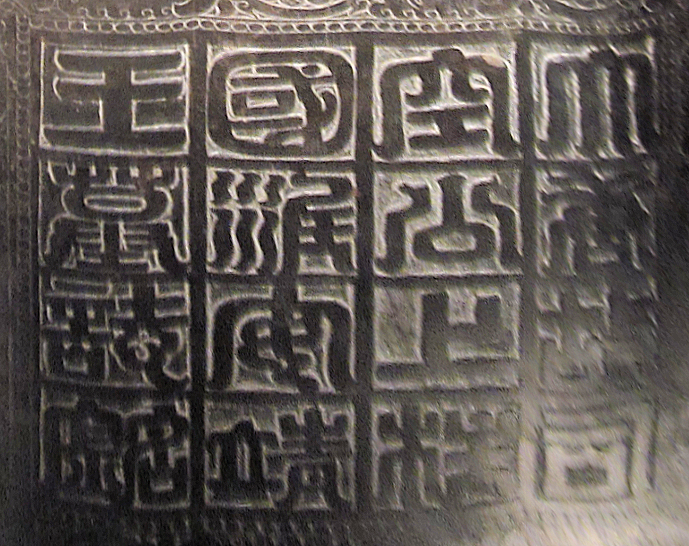
Epitaph of Li Shou in sigillary script: "大唐故司空公上柱国淮安靖王墓志铭"
