= Emperor Shenwu =

Emperor Shenwu may refer to:

- Gao Huan (496–547), Eastern Wei regent and father of Northern Qi's founding emperor Gao Yang
- Liu Chong (895–954), founding emperor of Northern Han
- Li Jiqian (963–1004), Tangut leader and grandfather of Western Xia's founding emperor Li Yuanhao

== See also ==
- Emperor Shengwu (disambiguation)
