= Li Xian (Northern Zhou general) =

Li Xian 李賢
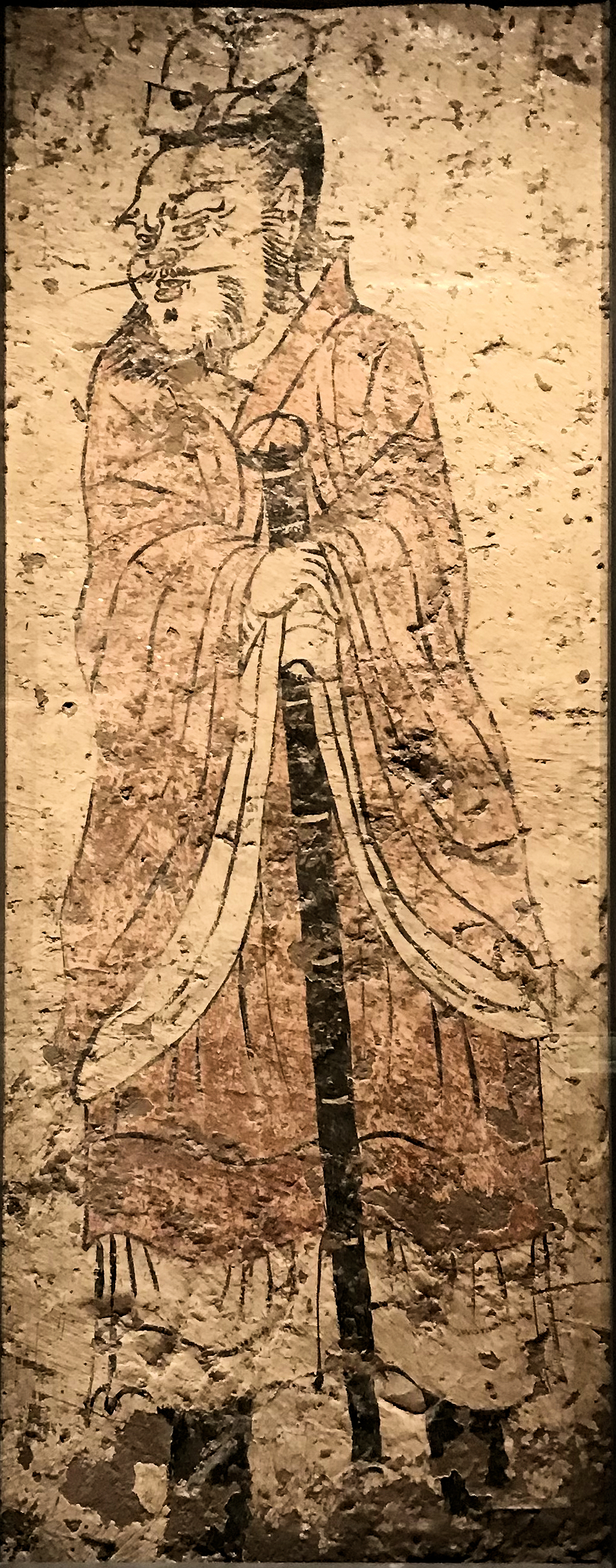
- Portrait from the tomb of General Li Xian.
- Created: 569 CE
- Discovered: Guyuan, Northern China

Location

Li Xian (Chinese: 李贤, Lǐ Xián, 502–569 CE) was a Northern Zhou general and Governor of Dunhuang. He was born in 502 CE in Guyuan, at the time under Northern Wei rule. As a soldier, he served the three dynasties of the Northern Wei, Western Wei, and Northern Zhou. Emperor Yuwen Tai entrusted him with the education of two of his sons during 6 years, as the imperial court had become too dangerous, and one of them, Yuwen Yong, would become Emperor Wu of Northern Zhou. Li Xian was in charge of defenses on the northern frontier of the Chinese Empire, in contact with the Silk Road. He died in Changan at the age of 66, in 569 CE. He was important enough to be mentioned in the Zhoushu and the Beishi. He was the great-grandfather of the famous Sui dynasty princess Li Jingxun.

His tomb, where he was buried with his wife Wu Hui (吴辉), was discovered in Guyuan in 1983 (北周李贤墓). The tomb was built in brick, and composed of a 42-meter sloping ramp leading to a square corbelled chamber. The walls of the whole structure were covered with paintings of officials, soldiers, servants, and musicians, but only a few have remained intact. Numerous small statuettes of servants and warriors were also found in the tomb (239 in total).

His epitaph suggests that his distant ancestors were of Tuoba-Xianbei, or possibly Turkic, descent. The epitaph of Li Xian contains the following line about his ancestry:

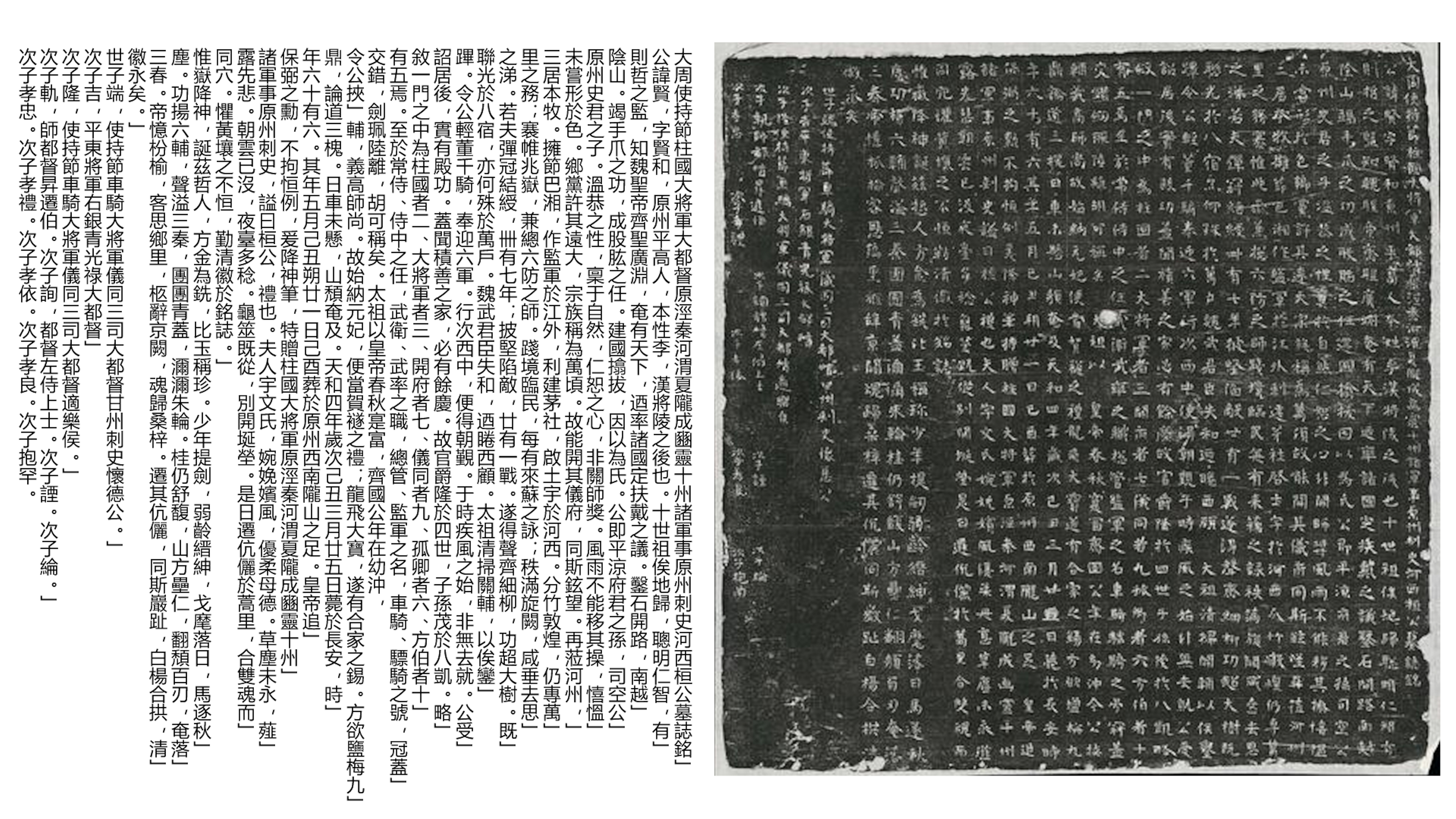
Epitaph of Li Xian, with transliteration

本姓李，漢將陵之後也。十世祖俟地歸，聰明仁智，有則哲之監，知魏聖帝齊聖廣淵，奄有天下，乃率諸國定扶戴之議。鑿石開路，南越陰山，竭手爪之功，成股肱之任，建國㩉拔，因以為氏

"The surname [of the deceased] is Li, a descendant of Han dynasty General Li Ling. His 10th generation ancestor was Yidigui, intelligent, generous and full of wisdom, cognizant of the nature of men, who knew Emperor Shengwu the very holy, ruler of the world, leader of all countries with justice, who opened roads among the rocks, went south across the Yin Mountains, used his skills to the utmost, accomplished major service, built the country of the Tuoba, and thereby achieved a great name."

— Epitaph of Li Xian (extract).

Although the epitaph states that Li Xian was descended from Li Ling, it also explains that his 10th generation ancestor was named Yidigui ("俟地归"), and that he had migrated south from the steppes across the Yin Mountains ("南越陰山"), so Li Xian himself had visibly not forgotten his origin from the northern steppes. According to the epitaph, Yidigui also was acquainted with the "Saint Emperor of the Wei" ("魏聖帝"), thought to be the Tuoba chieftain Tuoba Jiefen whose similar dynastic name was "Emperor Shengwu" (圣武皇帝), and who led the second Tuoba migration to the south.

Regardless of origin, the Chinese one-syllable name "Li" had been used at least since the time of his great-grandfather, who was Governor of Tianshui and "General of Pacifying the West" (laws had been passed forbidding Xianbei clothing at court, and demanding the adoption of Chinese one-syllable names during the 5th century CE). His tomb contained several Central Asian objects too, such as a ewer with Greco-Roman scenes. The grave also contained a sword with round pommel and scabbard-type attachment. According to the epitaph, he received a posthumous title: "Pillar of the State Great General" (柱国大将军)".

Li Xian claimed descent from the Longxi Li clan through the line of Li Ling. The Longxi Li were also claimed as ancestors by the imperial house of the Tang dynasty (618–907 CE) through a different line, though it was suggested in the 20th century that the Tang imperial house may have actually descended from an eastern lineage, the Zhaojun Li, who intermarried extensively with the "non-Chinese tribal aristocracy." The probable Tuoba-Xianbei origins of Li Xian as revealed by his epitaph has led to some scholars suggesting that the rulers of the Tang dynasty had "barbarian" patrilineal ancestors, rather than having Han patrilineal ancestors. It is already known that the Tang royal family had Turko-Mongol heritage from marrying Xianbei women, but they might have modified their genealogy to conceal a Xianbei paternal lineage while preserving various Xianbei customs.

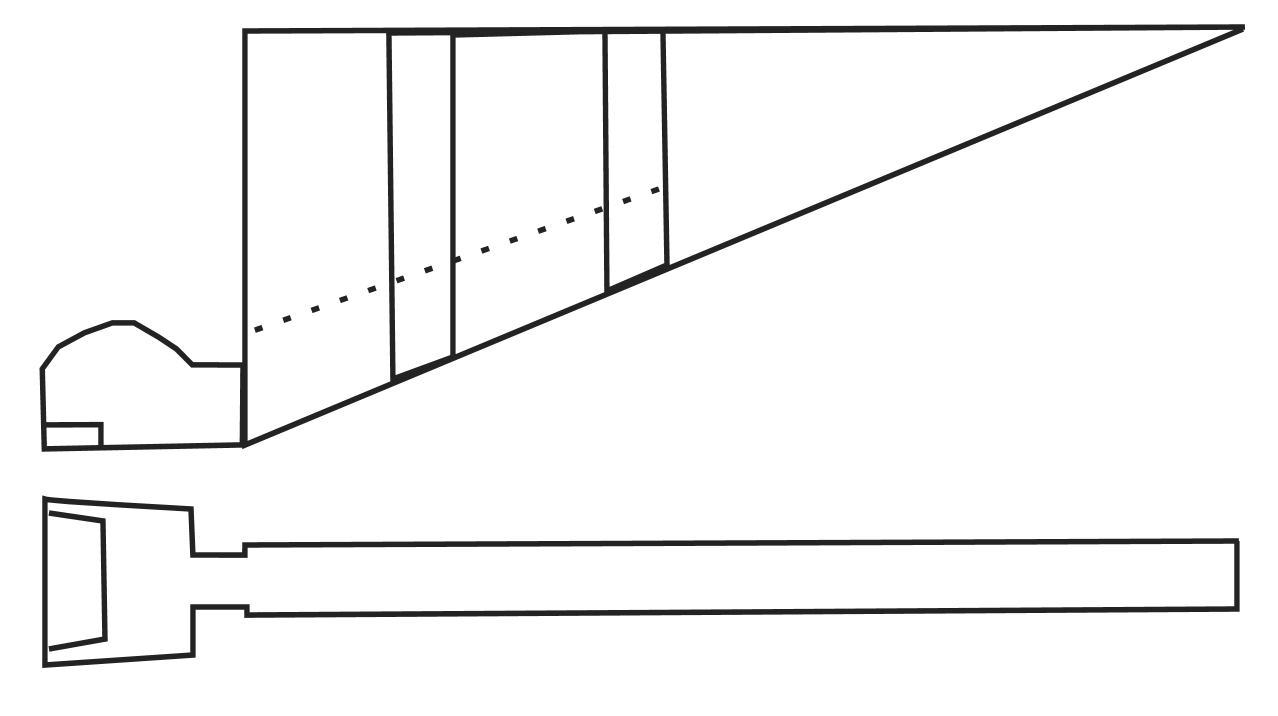
Tomb of Li Xian (plan). 42 meter sloping ramp leading to a square corbelled chamber. Structure similar to the Tomb of Li Shou

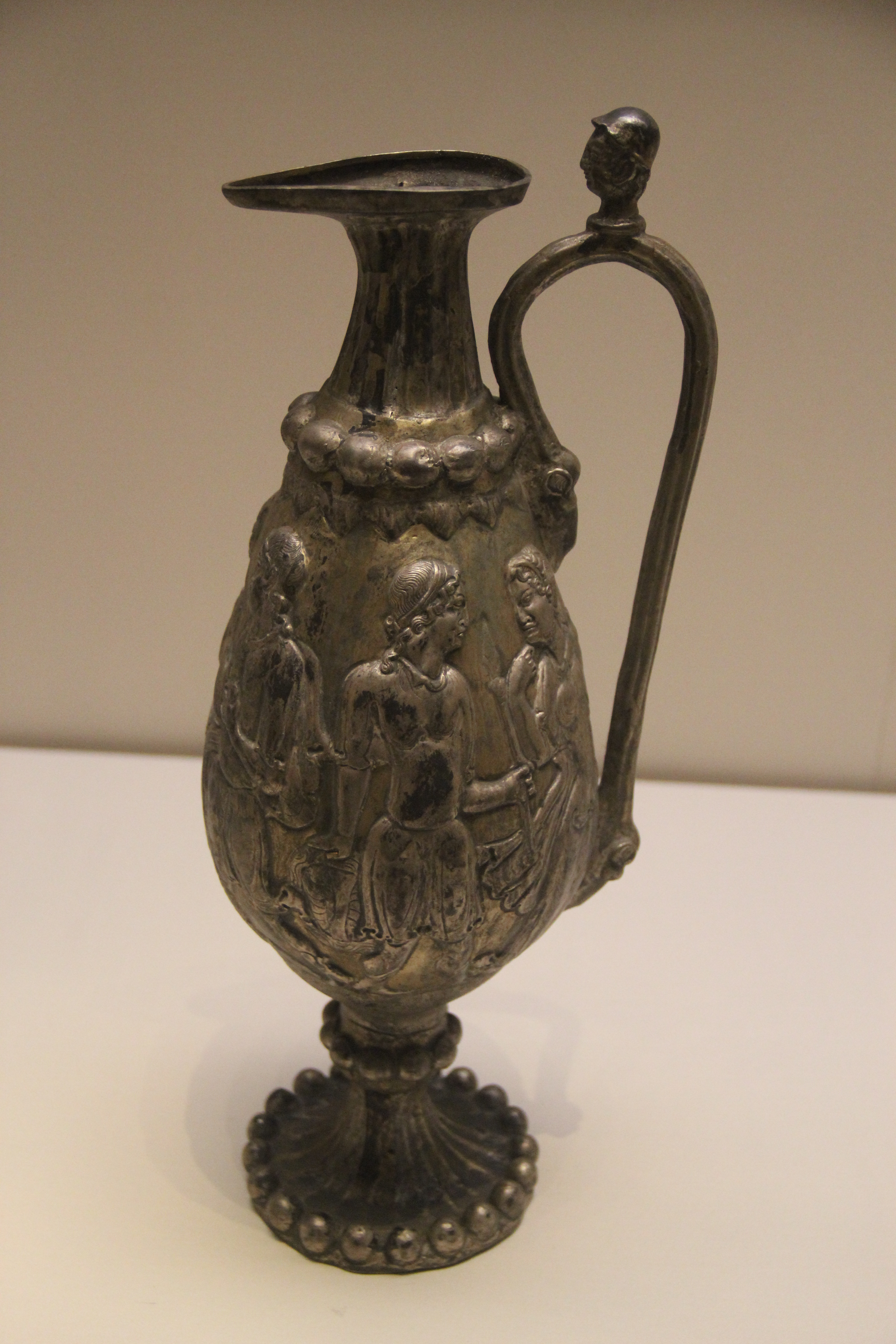
A ewer with Greco-Roman scenes from the tomb of Northern Zhou general Li Xian. It was probably made in Bactria.

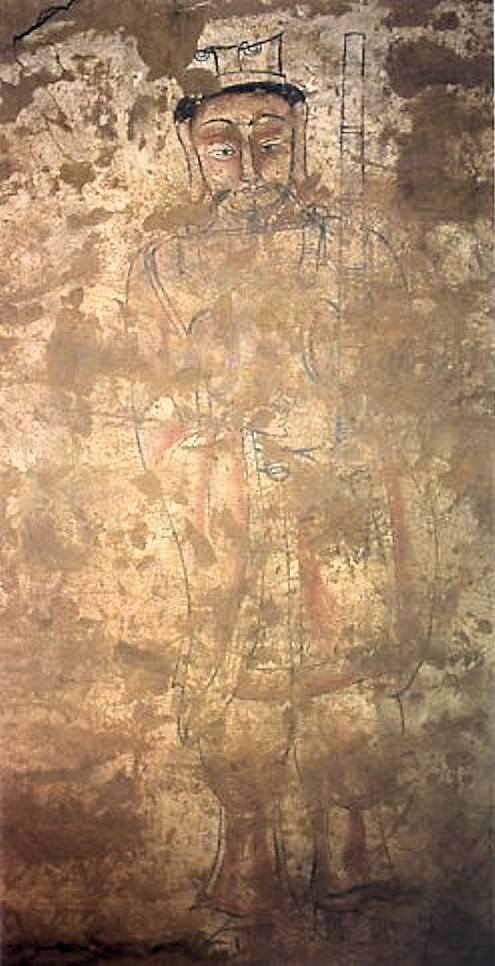
Tomb of Li Xian, panel

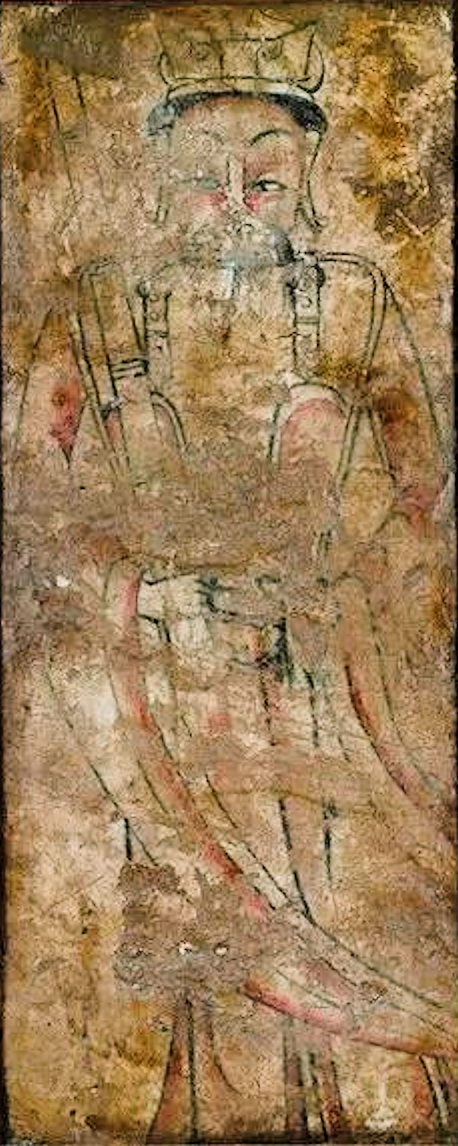
Tomb of Li Xian, panel

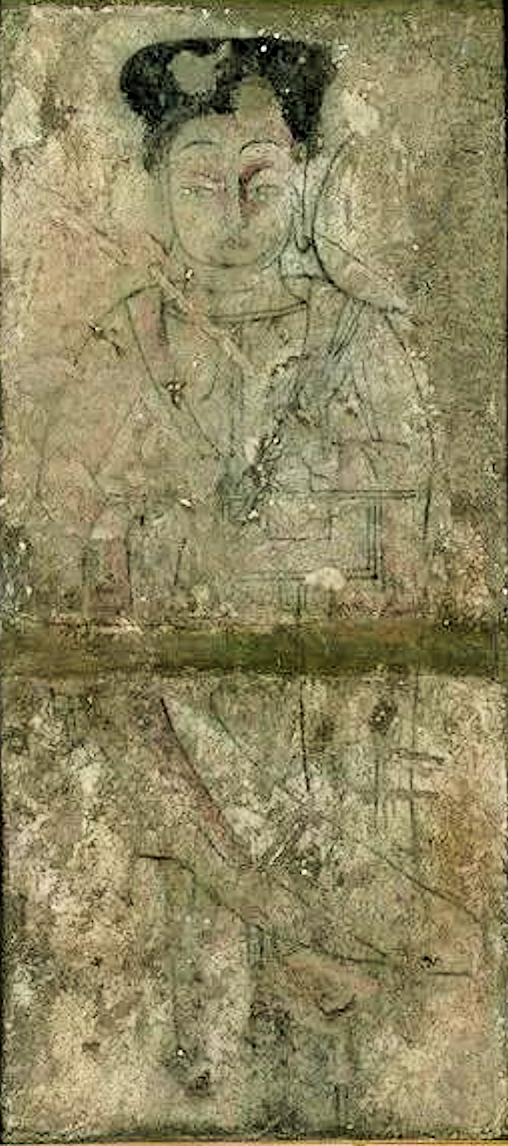
Tomb of Li Xian, panel

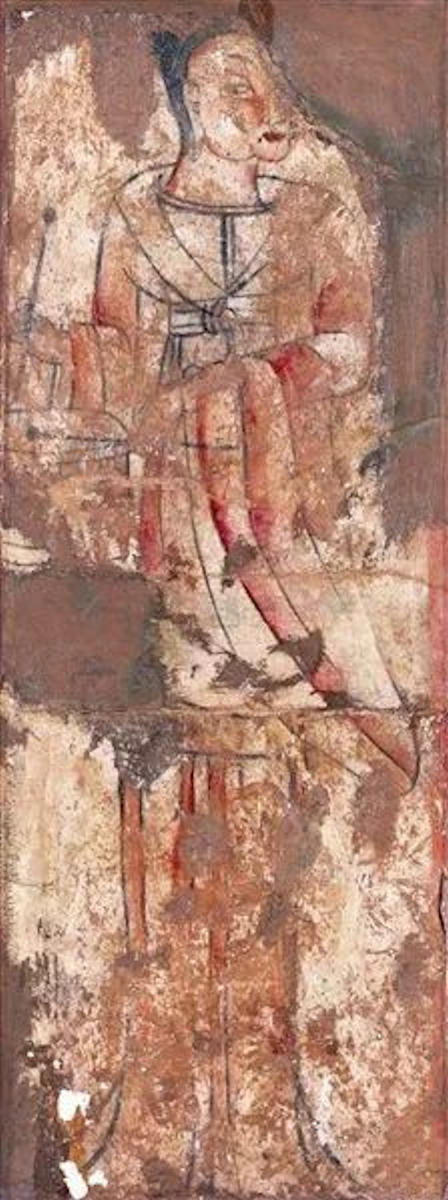
Tomb of Li Xian, panel

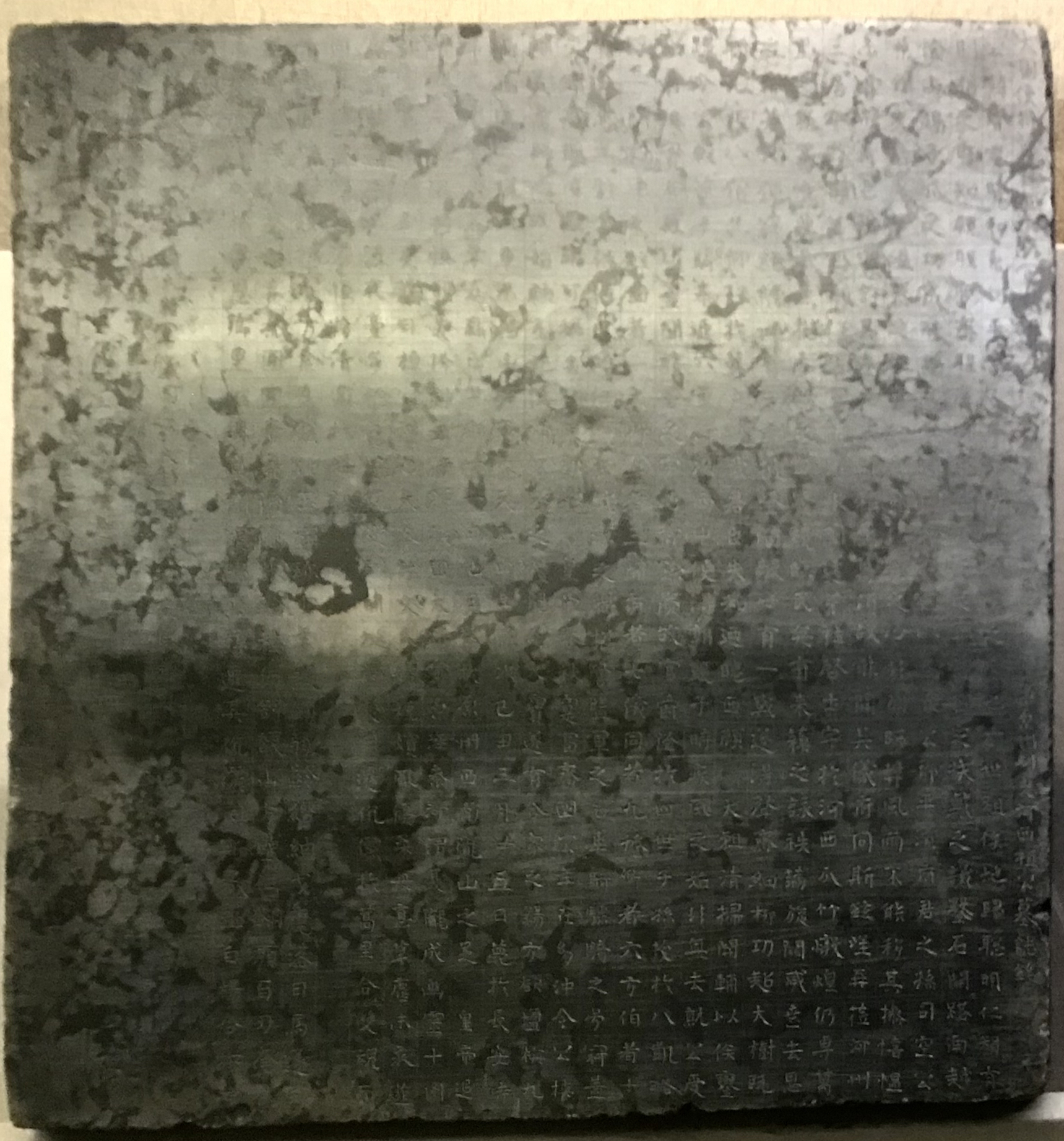
Epitaph of Li Xian (李賢墓誌).

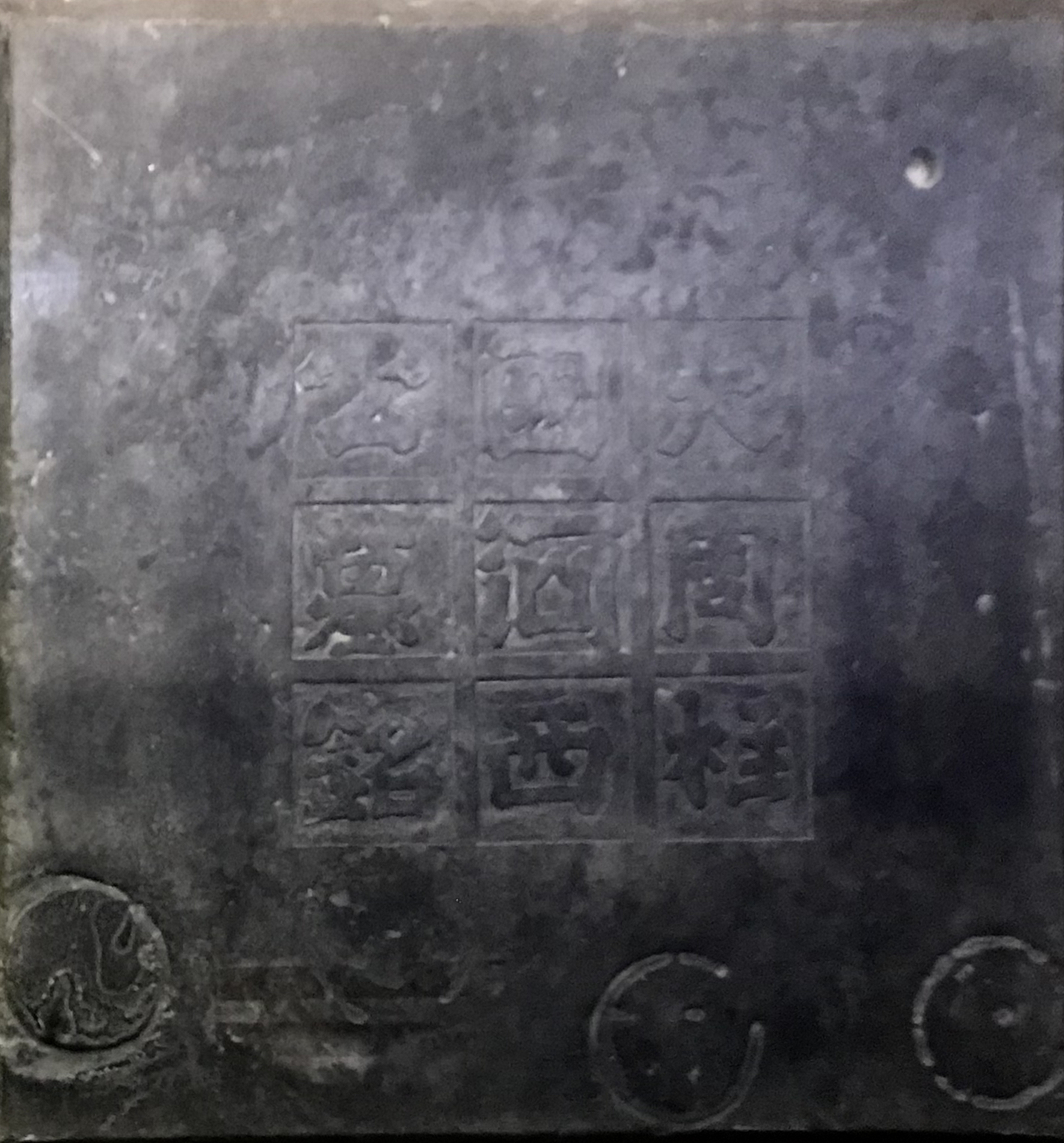
Tombstone of Li Xian

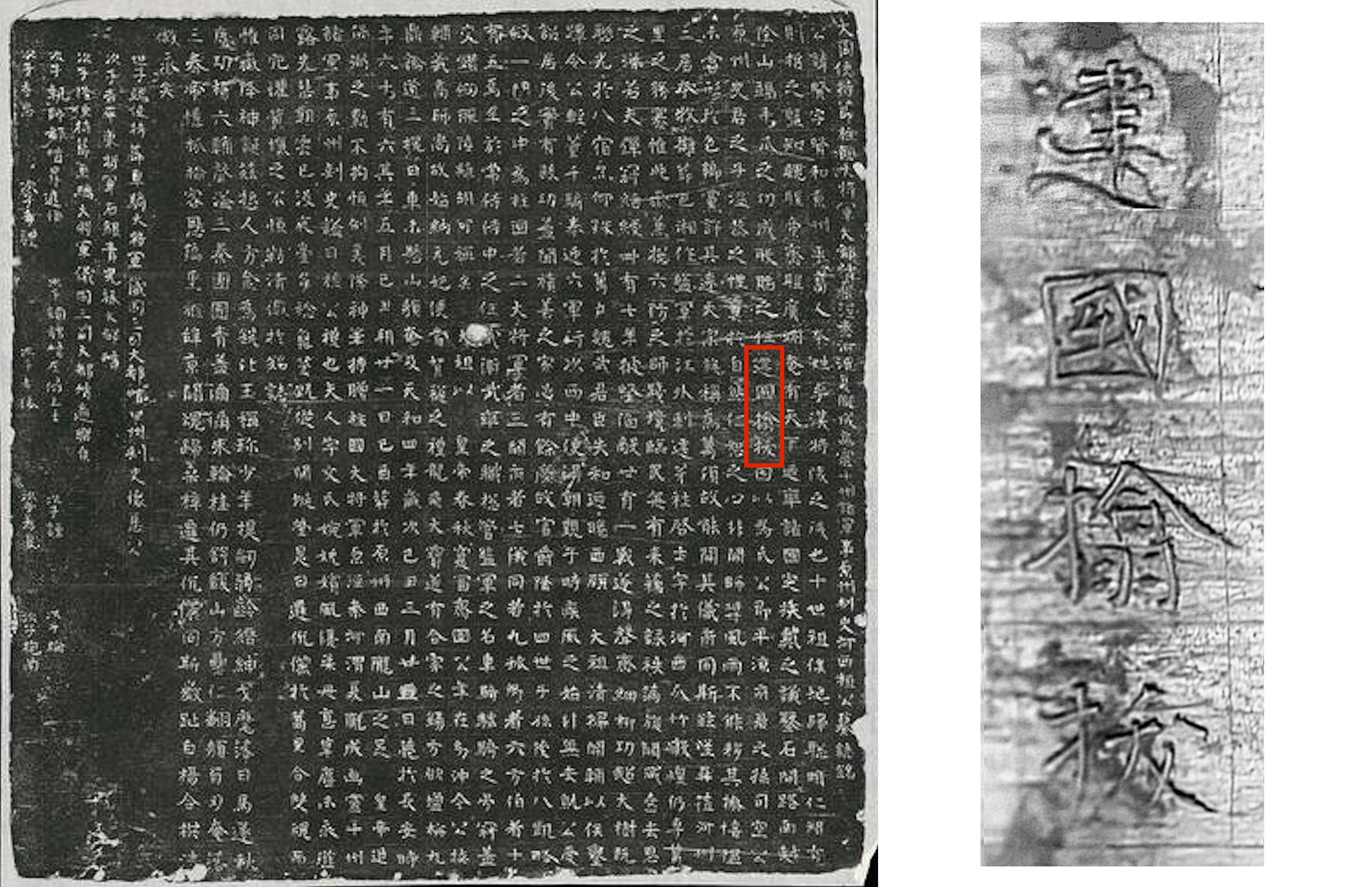
The expression "建國㩉拔" Jianguo Tuoba ("Built the Country of the Tuoba") in the epitaph.

== See also ==
- Central Asian objects of Northern Wei tombs
