= Tuoba Jiefen =

Tuoba Jiefen (Chinese: 拓跋詰汾) was the 14th ancestor of the imperial clan of the Northern Wei dynasty of China. He was the chieftain of the Tuoba tribe of the Xianbei, son of the ruler Tuoba Lin. He probably around either 190 or 195 CE. When Tuoba Gui (Emperor Daowu) founded the Northern Wei, Tuoba Jiefen was posthumously named Emperor Shengwu (聖武皇帝).

According to the Book of Wei, Tuoba Jiefen led the second southward migration of the Tuoba clan. A description of the event also appears in the "Treatise on Auspicious and Inauspicious Influences" (Lingzheng Zhi) in the Book of Wei:

The Wei lineage occupied Youshuo for generations, and then during the reign of Emperor Xian (Tuoba Lin), there was a spirit-person who spoke that they should move southward. At that time the succession fell to Emperor Shengwu (Tuoba Jiefen), who ordered that they migrate south, but the mountains and valleys blocked and cut off [the way], so [he] desired to stop there. Again there was a spirit-animal, his shape like a horse, his voice similar to a cow, who ran ahead to guide and lead them on for years then went away. Since then, they occupied the former territory of the Xiongnu.

— "Treatise on Auspicious and Inauspicious Influences" (Lingzheng Zhi) in the Book of Wei.

Tuoba Jiefen is probably the ancestral leader mentioned by the 6th century Northern Zhou general Li Xian in his epitaph, as "Emperor Sheng of Wei" (魏聖帝).

== See also ==
- History of the Northern Dynasties
