= Empress Yuan (Northern Qi) =

Empress of Chinese Northern Qi dynasty

Empress Yuan (元皇后, personal name unknown; fl.546-580) was an empress of the Chinese Northern Qi dynasty. known at times semi-formally as Empress Shuncheng (順成皇后) (due to her residence being Shuncheng Palace). Her husband was Emperor Xiaozhao (Gao Yan).

Her father, Yuan Man (元蠻), was an official during the preceding Eastern Wei as a member of its imperial clan and continued to serve in the Northern Qi government as a mid-level official. One of her uncles, Yuan Cha, was a regent of Northern Wei prior to its division into Eastern Wei and Western Wei. She married Gao Yan while or before he was the Prince of Changshan under the reign of his brother, Emperor Wenxuan, the first emperor of Northern Qi, and she carried the title of Princess of Changshan. They had one son, Gao Bainian. In 559, when Emperor Wenxuan ordered a general execution of members of the Northern Wei imperial Yuan clan, Yuan Man and his household were one of the few households spared, on account of Gao Yan's intercession. Emperor Wenxuan granted Yuan Man's household a new surname, Buliugu (步六孤), but Yuan Man and Empress Yuan appeared to abandon the name once Emperor Wenxuan died later in the year.

Emperor Wenxuan was succeeded by his son, Emperor Wenxuan. In 560, the prime minister, Yang Yin, suspicious of the authority that Gao Yan and his brother Gao Zhan, the Prince of Changguang, wielded as the emperor's uncles, tried to strip them of power. Instead, Gao Yan and Gao Zhan set an ambush for Yang and his associates, capturing and then executing them. Gao Yan took over control of the imperial government and, later in the year, his mother, Grand Empress Dowager Lou Zhaojun, issued an edict deposing Emperor Fei and making Gao Yan emperor (as Emperor Xiaozhao).

Emperor Xiaozhao made Princess Yuan empress and made her son, Gao Bainian, crown prince on 6 December 560. In fall 561, while on a hunt near the secondary capital Jinyang (晉陽, in modern Taiyuan, Shanxi), Emperor Xiaozhao fell off his horse and suffered severe injuries. Believing that he was near death but believing that Gao Bainian to be too young to take the throne, at age five, he issued an edict giving the throne to Gao Zhan. He died the same day, and Gao Zhan took the throne as Emperor Wucheng.

Empress Yu accompanied Emperor Xiaozhao's funeral train to the capital, Yecheng (鄴城, in modern Handan, Hebei). Emperor Wucheng heard rumors that the empress possessed medicines of great value, and he sent eunuchs to demand those medicines from her. She either could not or did not turn them over, and Emperor Wucheng had the eunuchs humiliate her. As she was his sister-in-law, not mother, he did not honor her as empress dowager, but only referred to her as Empress Xiaozhao and had her housed at a subsidiary palace, Shuncheng Palace (順成宮). He made her son, Gao Bainian, the former crown prince, the Prince of Leling.

In 564, with astrological signs showing ill fortune to the emperor, Emperor Wucheng wanted to deflect the ill fortune onto Gao Bainian, and he had Gao Bainian battered and then beheaded. After Gao Bainian's death, Emperor Wucheng kept Empress Yuan under close guard, and she was not even able to communicate with her father. After one incident, when she was found to possess letters from her father and brother somehow despite her guarded status, her father, Yuan Man, was removed from his office but was not killed.

In 577, Northern Qi fell to rival Northern Zhou. She, along with other members of the Gao clan, were moved to the Northern Zhou capital of Chang'an, and she took up residence in the Northern Zhou palace following the subsequent slaughter of members of the Gao clan by Emperor Wu of Northern Zhou. After Yang Jian became the regent of Northern Zhou in 580, he allowed her to return to Northern Qi's former territory. Nothing further is known about her activities or the date of her death.

Chinese royalty
Preceded by Empress Li Zu'e	Empress of Northern Qi; 560–561	Succeeded by Empress Hu
