= Ko (Korean surname) =

- Pronunciation: Go, Goh, Koh
- Gender: Male
- Language: Korean

Origin
- Meaning: high
- Region of origin: Korea

Other names
- Variant forms: Gao, Cao

Korean name
- Hangul: 고
- Hanja: 髙
- RR: Go
- MR: Ko

Ko (Korean: 고; Hanja: 髙; 高), also variously romanized Go, Goh, or Koh, is a common Korean surname.

Among Koreans with this surname, the largest clan is the Jeju Go clan, named for its bon-gwan (clan hometown) of Jeju Island; they claim descent from Go Eul-na, the first ruler of the kingdom of Tamna, which ruled Jeju until being absorbed by the Joseon dynasty.

== Origin ==
According to the Samguk Sagi, the Goguryeo royal family claimed descent from the mythical god Gao Yang, who was the grandson of the Yellow Emperor of Chinese mythology, and thus took the surname of "Go" (高); however, this legend was discredited in the commentaries (논찬; 論贊) by Kim Pusik, the compiler of the Samguk Sagi, who concluded that both Baekje and Goguryeo originated from Buyeo.

Liaoyang (Hanja: 遼陽) based Go (Hanja: 高) family is The Royal of Goguryeo, Northern Yan ruler Gao Yun (Hanja: 高雲), Tang dynasty general Gao Xianzhi (Hanja: 高仙芝) has Goguryeo origin. In South Korea, Hoengseong Go clan is also descended from the Royal dynasty of Goguryeo and the clan's genealogy book specifies Dongmyeong of Goguryeo as the direct ancestor.

== Statistics ==
According to the 2000 South Korean census, there were 435,839 people in 135,488 households with this surname. Among these, 325,950 people in 100,954 households were members of the Jeju Go clan. In a study based on a sample of applications for South Korean passports in 2007, 67.5% chose to spell it as Ko, 18.3% as Go, and 11.4% as Koh.

== Go or Goh ==
- Go Ah-sung (born 1992), South Korean actress
- Go Ara (born 1990), South Korean actress and model
- Go Bo-gyeol (born 1988) South Korean actress
- Go Bong-jae (born 1993), South Korean professional baseball pitcher
- Go Dae-woo (born 1987), South Korean footballer
- Go Doo-shim (born 1951), South Korean actress
- Go Eun-bi (1992–2014), South Korean singer and member of Ladies' Code
- Go Hui-dong (1886–1965), South Korean painter
- Go Hyun-jung (born 1971), South Korean actress
- Go Jae-hyun (born 1999), South Korean footballer
- Go Jin-won (born 1956), South Korean wrestler
- Go Joo-won (born 1981), South Korean actor
- Go Jung-gi (stage name Junggigo, born 1980), South Korean singer
- Goh Kun (born 1938), South Korean politician, former Prime Minister of South Korea and former Acting President of South Korea.
- Go Kyung-pyo (born 1990), South Korean actor
- Go Min-si (born 1995), South Korean actress
- Go Seul-ki (born 1986), South Korean footballer
- Go Soo (born 1978), South Korean actor
- Go Tae-seob (stage name Holland, born 1996), South Korean singer
- Go Woo-ri (born 1988), South Korean actress and singer, former member of girl group Rainbow
- Go Yo-han (born 1988), South Korean footballer
- Go Yoon-hwan (stage name Ryeoun, born 1998), South Korean actor
- Go Youn-ha (born 1988), South Korean singer-songwriter and record producer
- Go Youn-jung (born 1996), South Korean model and actress
- Go Young-jun (stage name Youngjun, born 1978), South Korean singer, member of Brown Eyed Soul
- Goh Young-jun (born 2001), South Korean footballer

== Ko or Koh ==
- Ko Chang-seok (born 1970), South Korean actor
- Koh Chun-son (born 1954), North Korean long-distance runner
- Koh Young-hee (born 1958), North Korean solo dancer and choreographer
- Koh Dong-Jin (born 1961), South Korean businessman, former CEO of Samsung
- E. J. Koh (born 1988), American writer and translator
- Koh Gou Young (born 1957), South Korean biologist
- Harold Hongju Koh (born 1954), American diplomat, lawyer, legal scholar
- Howard Koh (born 1952), former United States Assistant Secretary for Health for the U.S. Department of Health and Human
- Ko Hye-in (born 1994), South Korean ice hockey player
- Ko Hyeong-ryeol (born 1954), South Korean poet
- Ko Hyung-jin (born 1982), South Korean football referee
- Ko Im-pyo (born 1962), South Korean film editor
- Irene Koh (born 1990), South Korean-born comics artist in the United States
- Ko Jae-hyo (born 1980), South Korean former footballer
- Ko Jae-sung (born 1985), South Korean footballer
- Ko Jae-wook (born 1951), South Korean football manager and former player
- Jennifer Koh (born 1976), American violinist
- Ko Jeong-woon (born 1966), South Korean football manager and former player
- Ko Ji-yong (born 1980), South Korean singer and businessman, former member of boy band Sechs Kies
- Ko Jong-soo (born 1978), South Korean football coach and former player
- Ko Joo-yeon (born 1994), South Korean actress
- Ko Kwang-min (field hockey) (born 1981), South Korean field hockey player
- Ko Kwang-min (footballer) (born 1988), South Korean footballer
- Ko Kyu-pil (born 1982), South Korean actor
- Lea Ko (born 1988), American legal scholar
- Lucy Koh (born 1968), American judge
- Lydia Ko (born 1997), South Korea-born New Zealand golfer
- Ko Moo-yeol (born 1990), South Korean footballer
- Ko Myeong-seok (born 1995), South Korean professional footballer
- Koh Myong-jin (born 1988), South Korean footballer
- Ko San (born 1976), South Korean entrepreneur
- Ko Seung-beom (born 1994), South Korean footballer
- Ko Seung-wan (born 1981), South Korean curler
- Ko So-young (born 1972), South Korean actress and model
- Koh Suk-chang (born 1963), South Korean handball player
- Ko Sung-hee (born 1990), Korean-American actress
- Ko Sung-hyun (born 1987), South Korean badminton player
- Ko Sung-kuk (born 1955), South Korean political scientist
- Ko Tae-won (born 1993), South Korean footballer
- Ko Un (born 1933), South Korean poet
- Ko Yong-hui (1952–2004), North Korean dancer and mother of Kim Jong-un

== See also ==
- List of Korean surnames
- Korean name
