= Gao (surname) =

Gao / Kao
- Stroke order of the Gao surname
- Pronunciation: Gāo (Pinyin); Ko (Pe̍h-ōe-jī); Gou1 (Jyutping)
- Language: Chinese

Origin
- Language: Old Chinese
- Meaning: high, tall

Other names
- Variant forms: Gao, Kao (Mandarin); Ko, Kou (Cantonese, Hokkien)
- Derivatives: Cao, Ko

Gao (Chinese: 高) is an East Asian surname of Chinese origin that can be literally translated as "high" or "tall". There are approximately 17 million living people with this surname. Some places, such as Taiwan, usually romanise this family name into "Kao". In Hong Kong, it is romanized to "Ko". In Macau, it is romanized to "Kou". In 2019 it was the 19th most common surname in Mainland China. The Korean surname, "Ko" or "Koh", is derived from and written with the same Chinese character (高).

== Romanisation and pronunciation ==
Dialect or Format	Transliteration or Pronunciation
Mandarin	Gāo (Hanyu pinyin); Kao1 (Wade-Giles)
Cantonese	Gou1 (Jyutping)
Minnan	Ko (Peh-oe-ji)
Japanese	Kō
Vietnamese	Cao
Korean	Ko (McCune–Reischauer), Go (Revised Romanization)

== Origin ==
According to Lüshi Chunqiu, the earliest figure with the Gao surname was Gao Yuan (高元) who created dwellings in antiquity. Zhuanxu, the grandson of the Yellow Emperor, was also known as Gao Yang (高陽).

Another origin of Gao is the Jiang (姜) surname. According to the Song dynasty encyclopedia Tongzhi, an early ancestor was Gao Xi (高傒) who was granted the surname Gao in honour of his grandfather Prince Gao (公子高). Prince Gao was the son of Duke Wen of the state of Qi whose ancestral name was Jiang (姜).

Many non-Han Chinese used the surname Gao:

- The Xianbei clan of Lou (楼) of the Northern Wei period later changed their surname to Gao. The Yuan (元) family also adopted this surname in this period
- Xú (徐) family of the Northern Qi period
- Baipu (百濮) people of Yunnan (雲南)
- According to Samguk Sagi, the king of Goguryeo regarded himself as a descendant of Chinese heroes because he called his surname "Ko" (Hanja: 高) as he was the descendant of Gao Yang (Hanja: 高陽) who was a grandchild of the Yellow Emperor and Gaoxin (Hanja: 高辛) who was a great-grandchild of Yellow Emperor. However, this is discredited as a mythology by Kim Pusik, who mentioned that the surname Ko in Korea is from Buyeo origin.

== Notable people ==
=== Historical ===
- Gao Yang Founding Emperor of Northern Qi
- Gao Yin Second emperor of Northern Qi
- Gao Yan Third emperor of Northern Qi
- Gao Zhan Fourth emperor of Northern Qi
- Gao Wei Fifth emperor of Northern Qi
- Gao Heng Sixth emperor of Northern Qi
- Gao Yun (Northern Yan), Founding emperor of the Northern Yan dynasty
- Gao Cheng paramount official of the Chinese/Xianbei state Eastern Wei
- Gao Anagong official of the Northern Qi
- Gao Huan paramount general of the Chinese/Xianbei dynasty Northern Wei and Northern Wei's branch successor state Eastern Wei.
- Gao Shaoyi imperial prince of the Chinese dynasty Northern Qi
- Gao Yanzong imperial prince of the Chinese dynasty Northern Qi
- Gao Shilian, chancellor during the Tang dynasty
- Gao Shun, Military General under Warlord Lü Bu during the late Han dynasty
- Gao Jiong, official during the Sui dynasty
- Gao Yun (Northern Wei), official during the Northern Wei dynasty
- Gao Xianzhi, general during the Tang dynasty of Korean descent
- Gao Pian, general and politician of the late Tang dynasty
- Gao Qiong, general during the Northern Song dynasty
- Gao, guitarist
- Imperial Noble Consort Huixian, consort of the Qianlong Emperor

=== Modern ===
- Alice Longyu Gao, Chinese musician
- Gao Chengyong (1964–2019), Chinese serial killer
- Gao Dena, Donald Knuth, American computer scientist
- Gao Dezhan (1932–2026), Chinese politician
- Gao Gang, a Chinese Communist leader
- Gao Hanyu (also known as Kido, born 1989), Chinese actor and singer
- Gao Hong, pipa player and composer
- Gao Jianfu, founder of the Lingnan School
- Gao Jianli, a Zhu player and friend of Jing Ke
- Gao Jixing, a king of Jingnan
- Gao Jun, Chinese-American table tennis player
- Gao Lei (born 1992), Chinese Olympic individual trampoline gymnast
- Gao Lin, Chinese professional footballer
- Gao Ling, Chinese badminton player
- Gao Min (cyclist), Chinese cyclist
- Gao Min (diver), Chinese diver
- Gao Ning (born 1982), Chinese-born Singaporean table tennis player
- Gao Qifeng, founder of the Lingnan School
- Gao Qiu, character from Shui Hu Zhuan
- Gao Shiyan, Chinese basketball player
- Gao Shuying, Chinese pole vaulter
- Gao Song, Chinese figure skater
- Gao Weiguang (born 1983), Chinese actor and model
- Gao Xie, calligraphist, painter, poet, writer, book collector
- Gao Xingjian, 2000 Nobel Prize in Literature
- Gao Xiumin (actress) (1959–2005), Chinese comedy actress
- Gao Xiumin (handballer) (born 1963), former female Chinese handball player
- Gao Xu, poet, writer, publisher, revolutionary
- Gao Yang (disambiguation), multiple people
- Gao Yaojie (1927–2023), Chinese geneticist
- Gao Yihan, intellectual
- Gao Yisheng, creator of the Gao style of the Chinese Internal Martial Art of Baguazhang
- Gao Youxin (1916–1948), ace-fighter pilot of the Chinese Air Force during the War of Resistance/World War II
- Godfrey Gao (1984–2019), Taiwanese-Canadian model and television actor
- Gao Yuanyuan (born 1979), Chinese actress and model
- Gao Zhihang (1906–1937), ace-fighter pilot of the Chinese Air Force during the War of Resistance/World War II
- Gao Zhisheng, activist
- Gao Zhunyi (born 1995), Chinese footballer of Korean descent
- Gao Jianing, also known as J.G. Ex-member of South Korean boy group, Cross Gene, a contestant of Produce Camp 2019
- Judy Gao (born 1994), New Zealand fashion designer and chess player
- Curley Gao, also known as Xilinnayi Gao. Singer-songwriter, center of BonBon Girls 303, a debuted girl group of Produce Camp 2020
- Gao Qingchen, also known as Nine. Thai actor and singer of Chinese descent, member of the multi-national Chinese group INTO1, a debuted boy group of Produce Camp 2021
- Tapir Gao (born 1964), an Indian politician

=== Kao ===
- Charles K. Kao (1933–2018), inventor of data transmission using optical fibre, was awarded half of the 2009 Nobel Prize in Physics
- Jack Kao, Taiwanese actor
- Kao Ming-huey, International Commissioner of the Boy Scouts of China
- Kao Yang-sheng, former Political Deputy Minister of Council of Indigenous Peoples of the Republic of China
- Min Kao
- Ping-Tse Kao (1888–1970), Taiwanese astronomer
- Henry Kao (1913–2005), former mayor of Taipei, minister and senior advisor to the president of the Republic of China (Taiwan). First Taiwanese to receive an honorary doctorate from Waseda University, Japan.

=== Kō ===
- Kō no Moronao
- Kō no Moroyasu
- Kō no Morofuyu

=== Koe ===
- Koe Yeet (高艺) – Malaysian Chinese television and movie actress

=== Koh ===
- Koh Lip Lin (1935–2015), Singaporean politician

=== Cao ===
- Joseph Cao
