= Empress Yuan =

Empress Yuan may refer to:

- Empress Yuan Qigui (405–440), empress of the Liu Song dynasty, wife of Emperor Wen
- Empress Yuan (Northern Qi), empress of Northern Qi, wife of Emperor Xiaozhao
- Yuan Humo (? – 616), empress of Northern Zhou, wife of Emperor Xiaomin
- Yuan Leshang (565 – ?), concubine of Emperor Xuan of Northern Zhou
- The unnamed daughter of Emperor Xiaoming of Northern Wei (528 – ?), empress regnant of Northern Wei (not widely recognised)
