= Weizong =

Weizong is an imperial temple name accorded to several Chinese monarchs. It may refer to:

- Emperor Huan of Han (132–168), temple name Weizong abolished in 190 by Emperor Xian
- Emperor Wenxuan of Northern Qi (526–559), temple name changed to Weizong in 565 and changed back to Xianzu in 570
- Chongzhen Emperor (1611–1644), the last emperor of the Ming dynasty who had many temple names including Weizong which was given by Zhu Yujian
