= Emperor Fei of Northern Qi =

Gao Yin 高殷

Emperor of Northern Qi
- Reign: December 4, 559 – September 8, 560
- Predecessor: Emperor Wenxuan
- Successor: Emperor Xiaozhao
- Born: 545
- Died: c.October 561 (aged 15 - 16)
- Consorts: Li Nansheng of Zhao
Full name
- Family name: Gāo (高); Given name: Yīn (殷)
Era name and dates
- Qíanmíng (乾明): February 12, 560 – September 8, 560
Posthumous name
- Prince Mǐndào of Jinan (濟南閔悼王, "careful and lamentable")
- House: Gao
- Dynasty: Northern Qi
- Father: Emperor Wenxuan
- Mother: Empress Zhaoxin

Emperor Fei of Northern Qi ((北)齊廢帝) (545 – c.October 561), personal name Gao Yin (高殷), courtesy name Zhengdao (正道), posthumous name Prince Mindao of Ji'nan (濟南閔悼王), was briefly the second emperor of the Chinese Northern Qi dynasty. He was the oldest son of the first emperor, Emperor Wenxuan (Gao Yang), and he became emperor after Emperor Wenxuan's death in 559. However, in his young age, the officials fought over power, and in 560, Emperor Fei's uncle Gao Yan the Prince of Changshan killed the prime minister Yang Yin and took over power, soon deposing Emperor Fei and taking the throne himself as Emperor Xiaozhao. In 561, fearful of prophecies that Emperor Fei would return to the throne, Emperor Xiaozhao had him put to death.

== Background ==
Gao Yin was born in 545, when his father Gao Yang, then the Duke of Taiyuan, was not viewed as an important figure in Eastern Wei's governmental structure, as while Gao Yang's father Gao Huan was the paramount general of the state, Gao Huan's heir apparent was not Gao Yang but Gao Yang's older brother Gao Cheng. Gao Yin's mother was Gao Yang's wife, the ethnically Han Li Zu'e, who carried the title the Duchess of Taiyuan, who subsequently gave birth to another son, Gao Shaode (高紹德).

In 547, Gao Huan died, and Gao Cheng became effective regent of Eastern Wei, dominating the political scene, and he soon considered taking the throne from Emperor Xiaojing of Eastern Wei. However, while preparing, he was assassinated by his slave Lan Jing (蘭京) in 549. In the aftermaths of Gao Cheng's death, Gao Yang, as the next oldest son of Gao Huan, took control of the Eastern Wei government. In 550, then bearing the title of Prince of Qi, had Emperor Xiaojing yield the throne to him, ending Eastern Wei and establishing Northern Qi as its Emperor Wenxuan. Despite the opposition of some officials (based on her Han ethnicity), Emperor Wenxuan created his wife Princess Li empress and created Gao Yin crown prince.

Gao Yin was considered intelligent and considerate as a child. For example, when he held feasts at the North Palace, he would invite his cousins, but he would not invite Gao Cheng's son Gao Xiaowan (高孝琬), because Gao Cheng died in the North Palace, and so he did not want Gao Xiaowan to feast at his father's death place. Another episode mentioned by the Book of Northern Qi involved Gao Yin's being greatly impressed by the sexually moral official Xu Sanchou (許散愁) that he awarded Xu a great amount of silk. (It may very well be that the story was recorded as a veiled praise for Gao Yin's being himself sexually moral, as compared to his sexually promiscuous father and uncles.)

However, Emperor Wenxuan, who was violent and military-minded and who disfavored Han ways, felt that Gao Yin was too meek and considered deposing him. On one occasion, Emperor Wenxuan, who was accustomed to personally executing condemned prisoners inside the palace, ordered Gao Yin to carry out the execution. Gao Yin could not bring himself to do so, and, in anger, Emperor Wenxuan battered him with the handle of a whip. Since that incident, Gao Yin was recorded as suffering from a panic disorder, at times unable to speak and at times behaving erratically. At times, when the alcoholic Emperor Wenxuan was drunk, he would declare that he might eventually give the throne instead to Gao Yin's uncle Gao Yan the Prince of Changshan, further leading to questions of succession.

In fall 559, Emperor Wenxuan suffered a major illness that historians believed to be alcoholism-driven. He stated to Empress Li, "A person will live and die, and there is nothing to regret, other than that our son Gao Yin is still young, and someone else will take his throne." He stated to Gao Yan, "Go ahead and take the throne, but do not kill him!" However, he did not change the succession order, and after his death, Gao Yin took the throne as Emperor Fei.

== Reign ==
Pursuant to Emperor Wenxuan's will, the government was in the hands of several of his trusted officials -- Yang Yin the Prince of Kaifeng, Gao Guiyan (高歸彥) the Prince of Pingqin, Yan Zixian (燕子獻), and Zheng Yi (鄭頤). Gao Yan, while respected by the people, was not given great power, and while his (and Emperor Wenxuan's) mother Empress Dowager Lou Zhaojun had some desire to have Gao Yan made emperor instead, there was insufficient support at the time, and Yang, in fear that Gao Yan and another brother of Emperor Wenxuan, Gao Zhan the Prince of Changguang, would try to take power, took steps to curb their authorities. Emperor Fei honored his grandmother Empress Dowager Lou as grand empress dowager and mother Empress Li as empress dowager. Pursuant to his edicts, the palace construction projects that Emperor Wenxuan started, which caused much misery for his people in the latter years of his reign, were halted.

As Emperor Fei took the throne while he was attending to his father's deathbed at the secondary capital Jinyang (晉陽, in modern Taiyuan, Shanxi), when he proceeded to the capital Yecheng in spring 560, it was initially believed that Gao Yan or Gao Zhan would be put in charge of Jinyang—then perhaps the most militarily secure city in the empire; instead, by the arrangements of Yang and his associates, the two princes were ordered to accompany the young emperor to Yecheng.

Once the imperial train arrived at Yecheng, the situation became even more tense, as an associate of Yang's, Kezhuhun Tianhe (可朱渾天和), was convinced that Emperor Fei would not be safe in his reign unless his two uncles were killed, and alternatively, Yan Zixian considered putting Grand Empress Dowager Lou, who still wielded much power as the clan matriarch, under house arrest, and forcing her to turn her authorities to Empress Dowager Li. Meanwhile, the ambitious Yang was carrying out a governmental reorganization scheme to trim unnecessary offices and titles and to remove incompetent officials. The officials who were hurt by Yang's actions became disaffected and largely hoped that Gao Yan and Gao Zhan would take action and began to encourage them to do so. Yang considered sending Gao Yan and Gao Zhan outside the capital to be provincial governors, but Emperor Fei initially disagreed. Yang wrote a submission to Empress Dowager Li to ask her to consider, and she consulted her lady in waiting Li Changyi (李昌儀), who leaked the news to Grand Empress Dowager Lou. She informed the two princes, and they set up an ambush, with Gao Guiyan and the generals Heba Ren (賀拔仁) and Hulü Jin, at a ceremony where Gao Yan was to be named to a ceremonial post. Yang, Kezhuhun, Yan, Zheng, and Song Qindao (宋欽道) were all captured and severely battered. Gao Yan and Gao Zhan then entered the palace and publicly accused Yang and his associates of crimes; Yang and his associates were executed, and Gao Yan took control of the government. He soon went to take up post at Jinyang, controlling the government remotely.

== Removal and death ==
In fall 560, after Gao Yan convinced Grand Empress Dowager Lou the action is necessary, Grand Empress Dowager Lou issued an edict deposing Emperor Fei and making Gao Yan emperor (as Emperor Xiaozhao). The former emperor was created the Prince of Ji'nan. He was moved out of the main palace but was given a subsidiary palace at Yecheng. With Emperor Xiaozhao largely spending his time at Jinyang, Gao Zhan was in charge of Yecheng, and the prince was under his guard.

In fall 561, sorcerers informed Emperor Xiaozhao that the imperial aura was still at Yecheng, making Emperor Xiaozhao concerned. Meanwhile, Gao Guiyan, who was concerned that Gao Yin would one day take the throne again and retaliate against him, persuaded Emperor Xiaozhao that his nephew had to be removed, and so Emperor Xiaozhao issued an edict to summon Gao Yin to Jinyang. Gao Zhan, who at this time was disappointed at Emperor Xiaozhao not created him crown prince (instead creating his own son Gao Bainian crown prince), briefly considered redeclaring Gao Yin emperor and starting a rebellion against Emperor Xiaozhao, but ultimately chose not to do it, as his own sorcerers informed him that they believed that he would become emperor one day anyway. He therefore sent Gao Yin to Jinyang. Soon, Emperor Xiaozhao sent assassins to deliver poisoned wine to Gao Yin. Gao Yin refused to drink it, and the assassins strangled him. He was buried with honors due a prince, not an emperor.

== Family ==
Consorts:

- Princess consort, of the Li clan of Zhao (王妃 趙郡李氏; 549–570), first cousin, personal name Nansheng (難勝). No record mentioned her ever been created empress.

Regnal titles
Preceded by Emperor Wenxuan of Northern Qi	Emperor of Northern Qi; 559–560	Succeeded by Emperor Xiaozhao of Northern Qi
