= Gao Yang =

Gao Yang may refer to:

- Gao Yang clan 高陽氏 mentioned in the Zuo Zhuan, Wen Gong 18 (《文公十八年》)
- Zhuanxu the Chinese ruler, family name is Gao-Yang
- Emperor Wenxuan of Northern Qi, named Gao Yang
- Gao Yang (shot putter), shot putter
- Gao Yang (politician), former president of the Central Party School of the Chinese Communist Party
- Gao Yang (speed skater)
- Gao Yang (snooker player)
- Gao-Yang Yue, a branch of the Yue group of Chinese
