= Cao (Vietnamese surname) =

Cao is a Vietnamese surname. The name is transliterated as Gao in Chinese and Go in Korean. It is unrelated to the Chinese surname Cao, which is transliterated as Tào in Vietnamese.

== List of persons with the surname ==
- Cao Lỗ, weaponry engineer and minister
- Cao Bá Quát, poet and revolutionary
- Cao Thắng, bandit-turned-anticolonial fighter
- Cao Xuân Dục, scholar, historian-mandarin, and court adviser
- Cao Văn Lầu, musician
- Cao Văn Viên, General in the Army of the Republic of Vietnam (ARVN)
- Đoan Trang (Cao Thị Đoan Trang), singer
- Joseph Cao, lawyer, former US representative from Louisiana
- Hung Cao, Vietnamese-American government official and retired United States Navy officer
