= Emperor Xiaozhao of Northern Qi =

Emperor Xiaozhao of Northern Qi 北齊孝昭帝

Emperor of Northern Qi
- Reign: 8 September 560 – c.late November 561
- Predecessor: Emperor Fei
- Successor: Emperor Wucheng
- Born: 535
- Died: c.late November 561
- Burial: Yijing Mausoleum (義靖陵)
Full name
- Family name: Gāo (高); Given name: Yǎn (演)
Era name and dates
- Huángjiàn (皇建): 560–561
Posthumous name
- Emperor Xiàozhāo (孝昭皇帝; lit. "filial and accomplished")
Temple name
- Sùzōng (肅宗)
- House: Gao
- Dynasty: Northern Qi
- Father: Gao Huan
- Mother: Lou Zhaojun

Emperor Xiaozhao of Northern Qi ((北)齊孝昭帝) (535 – c.late November 561), personal name Gao Yan (高演), courtesy name Yan'an (延安), was the third emperor of the Chinese Northern Qi dynasty. He was generally considered a capable ruler, but ruled for less than two years before dying from injuries suffered from falling off a horse. The Northern Qi dynasty would not have another capable ruler after his death. He was only 26 when he died.

== Early life ==
Gao Yan was born in 535, as the third of six sons that Gao Huan, then the paramount general of Eastern Wei and the Prince of Bohai, had with his wife Princess Lou Zhaojun, after his older brothers Gao Cheng and Gao Yang, and Gao Huan's sixth son overall. He was said to be intelligent in his childhood, and was much favored by his mother Princess Lou. At age three, in 538, he was created the Duke of Changshan. He was said to be studious, particularly favoring the Book of Han in his studies.

== During Emperor Wenxuan's reign ==
In 550, Gao Yang, who had become regent of Eastern Wei following the deaths of Gao Huan in 547 and Gao Cheng in 549, had Emperor Xiaojing of Eastern Wei yield the throne to him, ending Eastern Wei and starting Northern Qi as its Emperor Wenxuan. As the new emperor's brother, Gao Yan was created the Prince of Changshan. He received a number of official posts during Emperor Wenxuan's reign, and was said to have distinguished himself in his ability to govern despite his youth, and was known for his solemnity. However, he was also said to be so stern in his ways that if subordinates carried out incorrect actions, he would cane them severely. At times, he participated in military campaigns that Emperor Wenxuan personally commanded.

Emperor Wenxuan ruled Northern Qi diligently early in his reign, but later in his reign, perhaps starting 554 or so, he began to act erratically and cruelly toward his officials and members of his own household. On one occasion, when invited to one of Emperor Wenxuan's feasts, his face showed sadness and anxiety, and Emperor Wenxuan deduced that he must have disapproved Emperor Wenxuan's preoccupation with drinking and women, and he declared that he would stop drinking—although his abstention from alcohol only lasted for several days. Emperor Wenxuan also favored irreverent and sometimes immoral games within his palace, but when Gao Yan was present he would curb his behavior, and while Emperor Wenxuan was known for often visiting nobles' households and having sexual relations with their women, regardless of their relationships to him, he did not do so as to Gao Yan's household. During this period of Emperor Wenxuan's reign, then, Gao Yan became one of the only few individuals who would dare to try to get the emperor to change his behavior, although often only with temporary effect. On one occasion, Gao Yan offered a petition listing a number of behaviors that he believed Emperor Wenxuan should change—and this caused Emperor Wenxuan to be exceedingly angry at him, threatening to kill him and sentencing Gao Yan's chief advisor, Wang Xi (王唏), whom Emperor Wenxuan suspected to have contributed to the petition, to hard labor. In a later incident, Emperor Wenxuan, after having awarded Gao Yan a lady in waiting while drunk, forgot about the award after he became sober, and accused Gao Yan of stealing the lady in waiting, battering Gao Yan severely with a sword hilt. Gao Yan became angry and went on a hunger strike. Emperor Wenxuan, in order to placate Gao Yan, then agreed to release Wang Xi from hard labor and return him to Gao Yan's headquarters. Meanwhile, Emperor Wenxuan, who distrusted Eastern Wei's Yuan imperial household, of whom Gao Yan's wife Princess Yuan was a member, tried to get Gao Yan to divorce Princess Yuan, but Gao Yan refused, and when Emperor Wenxuan carried out a massacre of the Yuans in 559, it was at Gao Yan's earnest intercession that Emperor Wenxuan spared Princess Yuan's father Yuan Man (元蠻) and his family.

Emperor Wenxuan's crown prince was his son Gao Yin, who was known for his studiousness, but Emperor Wenxuan, who, despite his Han ethnicity, favored Xianbei warrior ways, felt that Gao Yin was too Han in his thinking and repeatedly considered deposing him. Particularly when he was drunk, Emperor Wenxuan often stated that he would pass the throne to Gao Yan, and he stopped doing so only after being warned by his prime minister Yang Yin that his statements were potentially causing instability.

In fall 559, Emperor Wenxuan suffered a major illness that historians believed to be alcoholism-driven. He stated to his wife Empress Li Zu'e, "A person will live and die, and there is nothing to regret, other than that our son Gao Yin is still young, and someone else will take his throne." He stated to Gao Yan, "Go ahead and take the throne, but do not kill him!" However, he did not change the succession order, and after his death, Gao Yin took the throne as Emperor Fei.

== During Emperor Fei's reign ==
Pursuant to Emperor Wenxuan's will, the government was in the hands of several of his trusted officials – Yang Yin, Gao Guiyan (高歸彥) the Prince of Pingqin, Yan Zixian (燕子獻), and Zheng Yi (鄭頤). Gao Yan, while respected by the people, was not given great power, and while Grand Empress Dowager Lou had some desire to have Gao Yan made emperor instead, there was insufficient support at the time, and Yang, in fear that Gao Yan and another brother of Emperor Wenxuan, Gao Zhan the Prince of Changguang, would try to take power, took steps to curb their authorities. Meanwhile, Gao Yan's own supporters, citing the example of the Duke of Zhou, were suggesting to him that he should take power as the young emperor's uncle, and while Gao Yan initially rejected such overtures, he was watching the political scene carefully.

As Emperor Fei took the throne while he was attending to his father's deathbed at the secondary capital Jinyang (晉陽, in modern Taiyuan, Shanxi), when he proceeded to the capital Yecheng (鄴城, in modern Handan, Hebei) in spring 560, it was initially believed that Gao Yan or Gao Zhan would be put in charge of Jinyang—then perhaps the most militarily secure city in the empire; instead, by the arrangements of Yang and his associates, the two princes were ordered to accompany the young emperor to Yecheng.

Once the imperial train arrived at Yecheng, the situation became even more tense, as an associate of Yang's, Kezhuhun Tianhe (可朱渾天和), was convinced that Emperor Fei would not be safe in his reign unless his two uncles were killed, and alternatively, Yan Zixian considered putting Grand Empress Dowager Lou, who still wielded much power as the clan matriarch, under house arrest, and forcing her to turn her authorities to Empress Dowager Li. Meanwhile, the ambitious Yang was carrying out a governmental reorganization scheme to trim unnecessary offices and titles and to remove incompetent officials. The officials who were hurt by Yang's actions became disaffected and largely hoped that Gao Yan and Gao Zhan would take action and began to encourage them to do so. In spring 560, Yang considered sending Gao Yan and Gao Zhan outside the capital to be provincial governors, but Emperor Fei initially disagreed. Yang wrote a submission to Empress Dowager Li to ask her to consider, and she consulted her lady in waiting Li Changyi (李昌儀), who leaked the news to Grand Empress Dowager Lou. She informed the two princes, and they set up an ambush, with Gao Guiyan and the generals Heba Ren (賀拔仁) and Hulü Jin, at a ceremony where Gao Yan was to be named to a ceremonial post. Yang, Kezhuhun, Yan, Zheng, and Song Qindao (宋欽道) were all captured and severely battered. Gao Yan and Gao Zhan then entered the palace and publicly accused Yang and his associates of crimes; Yang and his associates were executed, and Gao Yan took control of the government. He soon went to take up post at Jinyang, controlling the government remotely.

Gao Yan's advisors, headed by Wang Xi and Zhao Yanshen (趙彥深), then suggested that he take the throne himself—noting to him that his actions in killing Yang and his associates meant that when Emperor Fei was grown, he would never be able to have a cordial relationship with Emperor Fei. Gao Yan agreed, and although initially Grand Empress Dowager Lou found the action inadvisable, she finally agreed. In fall 560, she issued an edict deposing Emperor Fei and making Gao Yan emperor (as Emperor Xiaozhao); however, in the edict, she sternly warned Emperor Xiaozhao to make sure that nothing would happen to Emperor Fei, who was demoted to the rank of Prince of Ji'nan. Grand Empress Dowager Lou became again known as Empress Dowager Lou, while Empress Dowager Li was given the title of Empress Wenxuan.

== Reign ==
Emperor Xiaozhao was said to be diligent in his actions, and after he became emperor, he spent all day looking at laws and regulations of Emperor Wenxuan, seeking to revise the laws that were inappropriate or too harsh. He was praised for his diligence, but also criticized for being overly obsessed with details. He was also said to be filial pious toward Empress Dowager Lou and loving to his brothers. One brother who was dissatisfied with him, however, was Gao Zhan, whom Emperor Xiaozhao had previously agreed to make crown prince—but who was passed over in favor of Emperor Xiaozhao's own son Gao Bainian, whom Emperor Xiaozhao created crown prince in winter 560, when he also created Princess Yuan empress. He also started long-term strategic planning against rival Northern Zhou, planning to gradually seize Northern Zhou territory east of the Yellow River bit by bit. He entrusted much of his decision-making to Wang Xi, Yang Xiuzhi (陽休之), and Cui Jie (崔劼), often having them stay in the palace all day to examine the laws and regulations.

In spring 561, Emperor Xiaozhao had the former Liang dynasty general Wang Lin (who had fled to Northern Qi in 560 after his failed attempt, supported by Northern Qi, to let Xiao Zhuang rule as Liang's emperor, against Chen dynasty and the Northern Zhou-supported Western Liang), take up position at Hefei (合肥, in modern Hefei, Anhui), to plan a campaign against Chen. Later, he made Wang the governor of Yang Province (揚州, modern central Anhui).

Emperor Xiaozhao, throughout his reign, stayed at the secondary capital Jinyang and did not stay at Yecheng, leaving Yecheng in Gao Zhan's control. In fall 561, Emperor Xiaozhao, concerned that Gao Zhan was becoming too powerful, tried to transfer some of Gao Zhan's authority to the general Hulü Xian (斛律羨, Hulü Jin's son), but Gao Zhan refused to transfer any of his authority. Meanwhile, sorcerers informed Emperor Xiaozhao that the imperial aura was still at Yecheng, making Emperor Xiaozhao concerned. Gao Guiyan, who was concerned that Gao Yin would one day take the throne again and retaliate against him, persuaded Emperor Xiaozhao that his nephew had to be removed, and so Emperor Xiaozhao issued an edict to summon the Prince of Ji'nan to Jinyang. Gao Zhan, was disappointed at Emperor Xiaozhao not created him crown prince, briefly considered redeclaring Gao Yin emperor and starting a rebellion against Emperor Xiaozhao, but ultimately chose not to do it, as his own sorcerers informed him that they believed that he would become emperor one day anyway. He therefore sent Gao Yin to Jinyang. Soon, Emperor Xiaozhao sent assassins to deliver poisoned wine to Gao Yin. Gao Yin refused to drink it, and the assassins strangled him. Emperor Xiaozhao soon regretted killing his nephew.

In winter 561, while hunting, Emperor Xiaozhao's horse was spooked by a rabbit, and he fell off the horse and suffered broken ribs. When Empress Dowager Lou came to see him, she asked him where Gao Yin was, and he could not answer. Empress Dowager Lou angrily stated, "Did you kill him? Because you did not listen to me, you should die!" and left without seeing him again. Soon, believing himself to be near death, he issued an edict stating that Gao Bainian was too young to take the throne, and that the throne was instead to be passed to Gao Zhan. He also wrote a letter to Gao Zhan, stating, "Bainian is innocent. You can do anything with him, but please do not kill him!" He died later that day, while lamenting that he was unable to serve his mother for the rest of her life. Gao Zhan soon arrived at Jinyang and took the throne (as Emperor Wucheng).

== Family ==
Consorts and Issue:

- Empress Shuncheng, of the Yuan clan of Henan (順成皇后 河南元氏)
  - Gao Bainian, Prince Leling Lianghuai (樂陵良懷王 高百年; 556–564), second son
- Pin, of the Sang clan (嬪 桑氏)
  - Gao Liang, Prince Xiangcheng (襄城王 高亮; 551–577), eldest son
- Lady, of the Liu clan (刘氏)
  - Gao Yanji, Prince Chengyang (城陽王 高彥基), fifth son
- Unknown
  - Gao Yanli, Prince Runan (汝南王 高彥理), third son
  - Gao Yande, Prince Shiping (始平王 高彥德), fourth son
  - Gao Yankang, Prince Dingyang (定陽王 高彥康), sixth son
  - Gao Yanzhong, Prince Ruyang (汝陽王 高彥忠), seventh son
  - Princess Jianchang (建昌公主; 560–606), personal name Shande (善德)
    - Married Mr. Lu (陸)

Regnal titles
Preceded by Emperor Fei of Northern Qi	Emperor of Northern Qi; 560–561	Succeeded by Emperor Wucheng of Northern Qi
