= Li Zu'e =

- Empress Zhaoxin 昭信皇后 (Note: honored in 560)

Empress consort of Northern Qi
- Tenure: 550–559
- Successor: Empress Yuan

Empress dowager of Northern Qi
- Tenure: 559–560
- Spouse: Gao Yang
- Issue: Emperor Fei of Northern Qi; Gao Shaode, Prince of Taiyuan; Gao Baode, Princess Changle
- Father: Li Xizong 李希宗

Empress Li Zu'e (Chinese: 李祖娥) (fl.545 - 581) was an empress of the Chinese dynasty Northern Qi, known at times semi-formally as Empress Zhaoxin (昭信皇后). (Note: due to her residence being Zhaoxin Palace) Her husband was Emperor Wenxuan (Gao Yang), the first emperor of Northern Qi.

== Life ==
Li Zu'e was the daughter of Li Xizong, (李希宗; 501-540) a prominent minister and advisor to Gao Huan; her mother was Li Xizong's concubine Cui Youfei (崔幼妃) the third daughter of the general Cui Kai of Cui Clan of Boling. Both of her parents were from influential families from Zhao Commandery (趙郡, in modern Shijiazhuang, Hebei). She was ethnically Han, a factor which, despite her good breeding and influential family, made Gao Yang's advisors at court put up opposition to their marriage as they would have preferred if he made one of his secondary consorts, the daughter of an influential Xianbei family, empress instead. Nevertheless, he did decide to marry Li Zu'e.

The exact date that she married Gao Yang, the second son of Eastern Wei's paramount general Gao Huan, is not known. (Note: The marriage probably took place in or before 545, as that was the year Gao Yin was born.) But in 551 AD, her mother was accorded the title of "Taiji" (Mother of the Empress). As Gao Yang was the Duke of Taiyuan during the reign of his brother-in-law, Emperor Xiaojing of Eastern Wei—Li Zu'e became the Duchess of Taiyuan. She bore two sons, Gao Yin, and Gao Shaode (高紹德). In 549, Gao Yang took over the regency of Eastern Wei after his older brother, Gao Cheng, was assassinated by the servant Lan Jing (蘭京). In 550, he forced Emperor Xiaojing to yield the throne to him, ending Eastern Wei and establishing Northern Qi (as Emperor Wenxuan).

=== Emperor Wenxuan ===
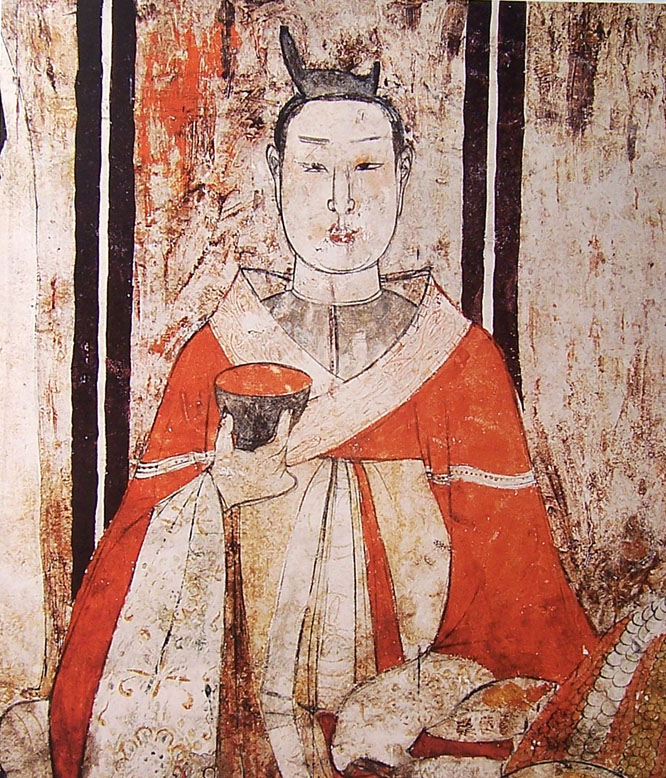
Noblewoman of the Northern Qi dressed in Xianbei clothing from a mural in the Tomb of Xu Xianxiu

Emperor Wenxuan, before he became emperor, also had another key consort—his concubine Lady Duan, the sister of his cousin and the powerful official Duan Shao, and niece of his mother Lou Zhaojun. (Note: Duan Shao was born of Gao Yang's aunt, but it is not clear that Lady Duan shared the same mother, so it is not clear whether Lady Duan was his cousin.) The officials Gao Longzhi (高隆之) and Gao Dezheng (高德政), wanting to ingratiate themselves with Duan Shao, suggested that a Han woman should not be allowed to be empress. Emperor Wenxuan rejected their suggestion and created Li Zu'e empress, and only created Lady Duan an imperial consort. Emperor Wenxuan also created Empress Li's son Gao Yin crown prince.

Emperor Wenxuan was violent and capricious in his behavior, fueled by his alcoholism, and often beat his consorts, although he never touched Li Zu'e. Once, when visiting Empress Li's household, he fired an arrow at Empress Li's mother, stating, 'When I am drunk, I do not even recognize my own mother. Who do you think you are?" However, despite Emperor Wenxuan's violent behavior—which included battering his concubines and sometimes even killing them—he remained respectful of Empress Li herself. In 559, he also began to have her referred to as both Khagatun (可賀敦, the Xianbei title for empresses) and empress. Emperor Wenxuan also wanted to take Empress Li's older sister Li Zuyi (李祖猗) as consort and murdered her husband. It was only at Empress Li's and Empress Dowager Lou's pleading that Li Zuyi was spared.

Another instance of violent behavior was when Emperor Wenxuan's concubine Consort Xue asked him to promote her father to a higher rank position as official. Consort Xue was a former servant of Emperor Wenxuan's relative Gao Yue, and had entered the palace with her sister. Consort Xue had previously had a sexual relationship with Gao Yue, and Emperor Wenxuan ordered Gao Yue to commit suicide. Thereafter, he beheaded Consort Xue and hid her head in his sleeves. At a banquet later that day, he tossed her head onto a platter and cut her body into pieces. He also began to play with her leg, surprising all of the banquet attendants. At the end of the banquet, he packed her body parts and began crying, following the cart carrying her body on foot.

=== Emperor Fei and Empress Zhaoxin ===
Emperor Wenxuan died in 559, and Gao Yin succeeded to the throne as Emperor Fei. Empress Li became empress dowager. However, the political climate of the time was uncertain, as there were suspicions that Emperor Wenxuan's mother, Grand Empress Dowager Lou Zhaojun, would encourage her sons Gao Yan the Prince of Changshan or Gao Zhan the Prince of Changguang to seize the throne. The prime minister Yang Yin, believing that the young Emperor Fei was being endangered, discussed a plan with Empress Dowager Li to gradually strip Gao Yan and Gao Zhan of power. Empress Li discussed the plan with one of Gao Cheng's widow consorts, Li Changyi (李昌儀), who was her good friend coming from the same clan of Li. Li Changyi subsequently revealed the plan to Grand Empress Dowager Lou, who in turn relayed the news to Gao Yan and Gao Zhan. The two princes responded by arresting and executing Yang and his associates Kezhuhun Daoyuan (可朱渾道元), Song Qindao (宋欽道), and Yan Zixian (燕子獻). Gao Yan and Gao Zhan took over the reins of government, and Empress Dowager Li lost her remaining authority. Six months later, by Grand Empress Dowager Lou's decree, Emperor Fei was deposed, and Gao Yan became emperor (as Emperor Xiaozhao). Empress Dowager Li lost her empress dowager title, and became known as Empress Zhaoxin, because she resided at Zhaoxin Palace. In 561, Emperor Xiaozhao killed her son Gao Yin the former emperor.

=== Emperor Wucheng ===
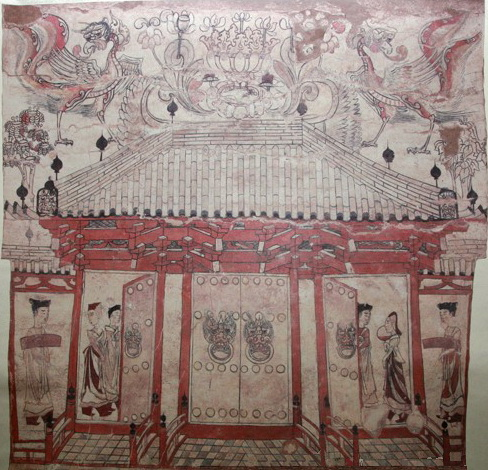
Palace with female figures from a mural Northern Qi tomb

Emperor Xiaozhao died in 561, and Gao Zhan became emperor (as Emperor Wucheng). Some time after Emperor Wucheng's taking the throne, he began to force Empress Li to have a sexual relationship with him—threatening her that he would kill her son Gao Shaode if she did not agree. She was raped by him many times. Eventually, she became pregnant, and in shame, she began to refuse seeing Gao Shaode. Gao Shaode found out that she was pregnant and became indignant. In shame, when she bore a daughter in 562, she threw the infant away, causing the child's death. When Emperor Wucheng found out, he became angry, and he stated, "Because you killed my daughter, I will kill your son." He summoned Gao Shaode and, in her presence, beat him to death with the hilt of a sword. She cried bitterly, and Emperor Wucheng, in anger, stripped her and pounded her. She suffered severe injuries, but eventually recovered, and Emperor Wucheng expelled her from the palace to be a Buddhist nun.

In 577, Northern Qi was destroyed by its rival, Northern Zhou. Empress Li followed the Emperor Wucheng's son Gao Wei, the penultimate emperor, to the Northern Zhou capital Chang'an, where the members of Northern Qi's imperial Gao clan were slaughtered later that year. After Northern Zhou's own destruction in 581, Emperor Wen of Sui permitted her to leave Chang'an, and she returned to her home in Zhao Commandery. Nothing further is known about her, including the date of her death.

Some scholars have argued that a depiction of Maya (mother of the Buddha) in cave 5 of the Xiangtangshan site in Henan represents the empress Li Zu'e mourning the death of her son Emperor Fei of Northern Qi.

== Notes ==
Chinese royalty
New dynasty	Empress of Northern Qi; 550–559	Succeeded by Empress Yuan
Preceded by Empress Gao of Eastern Wei	Empress of China (Northern/Central); 550–559	Succeeded by Empress Yuan
