= Gao Bainian =

Northern Qi Chinese prince

Gao Bainian (高百年) (556 – c.July 564) was a crown prince of the Chinese Northern Qi dynasty.

== Early life ==
Gao Bainian was born in 556. He was Emperor Xiaozhao's second son but was considered his proper heir because he was born of his wife Empress Yuan. After he became emperor on 8 September 560, he created Gao Bainian crown prince on 6 December. It was during Gao Bainian's tenure as crown prince that he married his wife Crown Princess Hulü, a daughter of the general Hulü Guang. In late 561, Emperor Xiaozhao suffered severe injuries after falling off a horse. Believing himself to be near death, he decided that Gao Bainian was too young to take the throne, at age five, so he issued an edict giving the throne instead to his brother Gao Zhan the Prince of Changguang. In a letter to Gao Zhan, Emperor Xiaozhao wrote, "Bainian is innocent. You can do anything with him, but please do not kill him!" He died later that day, and Gao Zhan took the throne as Emperor Wucheng. Emperor Wucheng created Gao Bainian the Prince of Leling on 5 December 561.

== Execution ==
In 564, there were ominous astrological signs that suggested ill fortune for the emperor. Emperor Wucheng wanted to deflect the ill fortune onto Gao Bainian. The scholar Jia Dezhou (賈德冑) had been earlier commissioned to be Gao Bainian's teacher, and while Gao Bainian learned calligraphy, he had once written several instances of the character chi (敕) -- a character that meant "imperial edict," and which only the emperor was supposed to use. Jia sealed the characters chi that Gao Bainian had written and submitted them to Emperor Wucheng. Emperor Wucheng summoned Gao Bainian to the palace, and Gao Bainian, believing that he was about to be killed, took off the jade pendant that he wore and gave it to Princess Hulü. Once in the palace, Emperor Wucheng ordered Gao Bainian to write the character chi, and the handwriting matched the chi characters that Jia submitted. Emperor Wucheng then had his guards batter Gao Bainian severely with sticks, and then drag him around Liangfeng Hall (涼風堂) and continue to batter him. His blood was everywhere, and he pleaded for his life, to no avail. Eventually, Emperor Wucheng had him beheaded and his body thrown into a pool, staining the pool red. Princess Hulü was so saddened by her husband's death that she refused to eat, and she died after a month of not eating. Later, during the reign of Emperor Wucheng's son Gao Wei, a number of imperial halls were torn down and rebuilt. As one of the halls was torn down, a small body wearing an imperial prince robe was found, and it was thought to be Gao Bainian's.
