= Lou Zhaojun =

Empress dowager of Northern Qi (501-562)

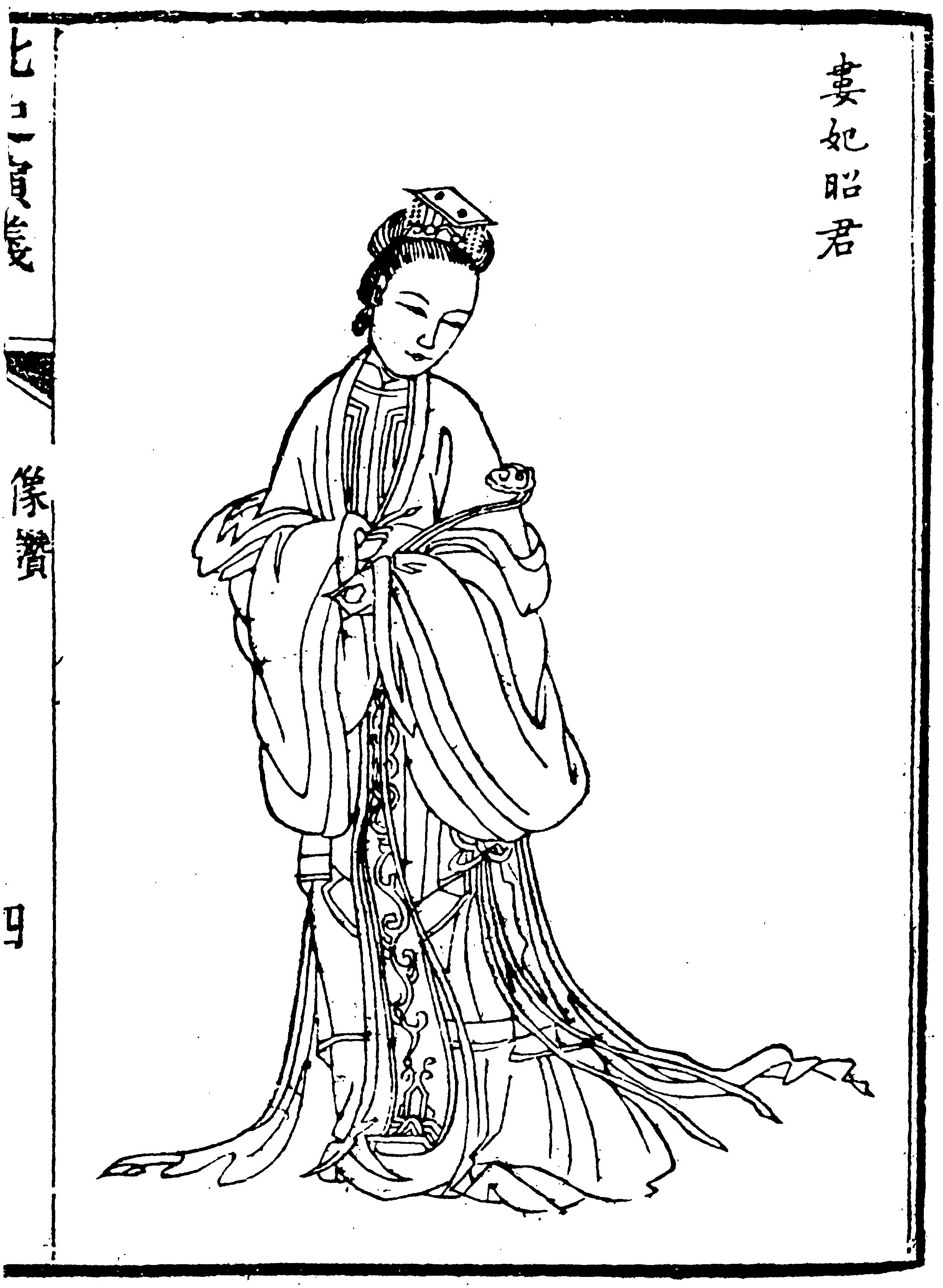

Empress dowager of Northern Qi
- Tenure: 550–559
- Tenure: 560–562

Grand empress dowager of Northern Qi
- Tenure: 559–560
- Born: 501
- Died: 20 May 562 (aged 61)
- Spouse: Gao Huan
- Issue: Gao Cheng, Emperor Wenxiang; Gao Yang, Emperor Wenxuan; Gao Yan, Emperor Xiaozhao; Gao Yu, Prince Jing of Xiangcheng; Gao Zhan, Emperor Wucheng; Gao Ji, Prince Wenjian of Boling; Empress Gao of Northern Wei; Empress Gao of Eastern Wei
Posthumous name
- Empress Wuming (武明皇后)
- Father: Lou Gan

Lou Zhaojun (Chinese: 婁昭君; 501 – 20 May 562), posthumous name Empress Wuming (武明皇后), was an empress dowager and grand empress dowager of the Chinese Northern Qi dynasty. She was the wife of Gao Huan, the paramount general of the late Northern Wei and Eastern Wei dynasties, and during Gao Huan's lifetime was already influential on the political scene. After Gao Huan's death, she continued to exert influence through the regency of her son Gao Cheng, and then as empress dowager after another son Gao Yang (Emperor Wenxuan) seized the Eastern Wei throne and established the Northern Qi. She continued to serve as grand empress dowager through the reigns of Gao Yang's son Gao Yin, and then again as empress dowager during the reigns of two more of her own sons, Emperor Xiaozhao and Emperor Wucheng.

== Background and marriage to Gao Huan ==
Lou Zhaojun was born in 501, of Xianbei ethnicity, as the daughter of a rich merchant, Lou Gan (婁幹), and she grew up in Pingcheng (平城, in modern Datong, Shanxi), the old capital of Northern Wei. In her youth, she was described to be intelligent and resolute, and when she saw Gao Huan, who was then too poor even to own a horse, serving as a soldier and standing guard on Pingcheng's wall, she became so impressed by him that she, against customs of the times that women's marriages were to be arranged by parents, became resolved to marry him, sending her servant girls to Gao Huan to deliver messages and monetary gifts for her. Her parents therefore became forced to allow the marriage, and they were married. In 521, she gave birth to a son, Gao Cheng. (Note: Lou would eventually have six sons: Gao Cheng, Gao Yang, Gao Yan, Gao Zhan, Gao Yu (高淯), and Gao Ji (高濟), and two daughters: the eventual empresses for Emperor Xiaowu of Northern Wei and Emperor Xiaojing of Eastern Wei. Emperor Xiaowu's widow later remarried a grandson of Yuan Xie, while Emperor Xiaojing's widow later remarried Yang Yin.) It was only after their marriage that Gao Huan could even afford a horse and was able to become an imperial messenger, delivering the governmental reports between Pingcheng and the new capital Luoyang. Once, when Gao Huan was severely battered, she cared for him all day and night and nursed him back to health.

In 525, when large portions of Northern Wei territory was overrun by agrarian rebels, Gao Huan, taking his family, (Note: then apparently made up of Lady Lou, Gao Cheng, and their oldest daughter) joined the rebellion of one of the major rebels, Du Luozhou (杜洛周), but subsequently became unimpressed with Du's behavior, and they fled from Du's camp and joined another rebel leader, Ge Rong, but he eventually left Ge as well and joined the army of the Northern Wei general and Xiongnu tribal leader Erzhu Rong. Erzhu was initially unimpressed with Gao and did not give him great responsibilities; it was around this time that the family's wealth was so drained that Lady Lou herself made boots personally out of horse skin. Eventually, though, Gao's talent impressed Erzhu, and he became one of Erzhu's key commanders in his campaigns, first to seize power at Luoyang in 528, then on his campaign to destroy the rebels and reunify the empire. Lady Lou's brother Lou Zhao (婁昭) eventually became a key commander under Gao Huan. Gao Huan was said to also often consult Lady Lou herself for her views on important decisions.

In 530, Emperor Xiaozhuang of Northern Wei, suspicious that Erzhu Rong would eventually seize the throne, ambushed him in the palace and killed him. Erzhu Rong's relatives, led by his cousin Erzhu Shilong and nephew Erzhu Zhao, rose against Emperor Xiaozhuang, defeating and killing him later in the year. Gao Huan did not break with the Erzhus at this time, but was largely uninvolved in their campaign against Emperor Xiaozhuang, although he did aid Erzhu Zhao later in the year, after Emperor Xiaozhuang's death, in Erzhu Zhao's campaign against the general Gedouling Bufan (紇豆陵步番), who was loyal to Emperor Xiaozhuang. Under the instigation of the Erzhus, Emperor Jiemin of Northern Wei, whom the Erzhus had made emperor, created Gao Huan the Prince of Bohai, and Lady Lou thereafter carried the title the Princess of Bohai. In 531, seeing that the people were disappointed in the level of corruption shown by the Erzhus, he declared a rebellion against them, defeating them in 532 and deposing Emperor Jiemin, whom the Erzhus made emperor. He made Yuan Xiu the Prince of Pingyang emperor (as Emperor Xiaowu), and gave Princess Lou's oldest daughter to Emperor Xiaowu in marriage as his empress.

Emperor Xiaowu, however, strained to free himself from Gao Huan, and their relationship soon deteriorated, as Emperor Xiaowu entered into alliances with the independent generals Yuwen Tai, who controlled the western provinces, and Heba Sheng, who controlled the southern provinces, against Gao Huan. In 534, when Emperor Xiaowu secretly prepared to attack Gao Huan, Gao Huan saw through his façade, and marched on Luoyang. Emperor Xiaowu fled to Yuwen Tai's territory, without taking Empress Gao with him. Gao Huan declared Yuan Shanjian, the son of Emperor Xiaowu's cousin Yuan Dan (元亶) the Prince of Qinghe emperor (as Emperor Xiaojing), and Northern Wei was divided in two, Eastern Wei under Emperor Xiaojing and Western Wei under Emperor Xiaowu.

Lou Zhaojun supported and assisted Gao Huan when he married more women, wanting to expand his power.

== During Eastern Wei ==
An incident involving Gao Cheng soon threatened to undermine not only his position as Gao Huan's heir apparent but Princess Lou. In 535, Gao Cheng was discovered to have had an affair with Gao Huan's concubine Zheng Dache (鄭大車). Gao Huan was so angry that he caned Gao Cheng 100 times and put him under house arrest, and also refused to see Princess Lou. At that time, his favorite concubine was Erzhu Rong's daughter and Emperor Xiaozhuang's former empress Erzhu Ying'e, whose son Gao You (高浟) he now considered making heir apparent to replace Gao Cheng. Only at the intercession of Gao Huan's friend Sima Ziru (司馬子如)—who first reminded Gao Huan Princess Lou's contributions to his success, as well as Lou Zhao's, and then forced the main witness to the affair, Lady Zheng's servant girl, to commit suicide—were Gao Cheng and Princess Lou able to remain in their positions. Still, Princess Lou and Gao Cheng submitted themselves to humiliating apologies to Gao Huan, where they knelt at each step as they approached Gao Huan after Gao Huan went to see them. After the incident, however, Gao Huan appeared to continue to honor Princess Lou and turn to her for advice. For example, in 537, in the aftermaths of Gao Huan's defeat against Yuwen Tai at Shawan (沙苑, in modern Weinan, Shaanxi), the general Hou Jing suggested making an ambush against Yuwen's own camp; it was Princess Lou who advised Gao Huan against such action, noting that if Hou actually captured Yuwen, Hou would never return.

In 539, Princess Lou's second daughter married Emperor Xiaojing as his empress.

In fall 545, due to an alliance between Western Wei and Rouran to attack Eastern Wei, Gao Huan sued for peace with Rouran by requesting a marriage between a daughter of Rouran's Chiliantoubingdoufa Khan Yujiulü Anagui and Gao Cheng. Yujiulü Anagui refused, stating that it would only be sufficient if Gao Huan himself married her. Gao Huan himself initially refused, but Princess Lou, Gao Cheng, and the general Wei Jing all persuaded him otherwise, and he married Yujiulü Anagui's daughter, referring to her as the Princess Ruru (蠕蠕公主). To facilitate this marriage, Princess Lou moved out of the mansion (and in gratitude, Gao Huan himself knelt down to Princess Lou to thank her), but Gao Huan and Princess Lou were not formally divorced, although, at Princess Lou's own request (arguing that the Princess Ruru would realize what was happening), Gao Huan did not visit her.

In 547, Gao Huan died, and Gao Cheng took over as regent. Princess Lou thereafter carried the title of Princess Dowager of Bohai. In 549, Gao Cheng was in turn assassinated by his slave Lan Jing (蘭京), and Princess Dowager Lou's second son Gao Yang assumed the regency. In 550, despite Princess Lou's reservations, Gao Yang had Emperor Xiaojing yield the throne to him, ending Eastern Wei and starting Northern Qi (as its Emperor Wenxuan). He honored her as empress dowager.

== During Emperor Wenxuan's reign ==
During the reign of Emperor Wenxuan—whom she had previously considered be unintelligent but whose reign initially was one characterized by diligence—Empress Dowager Lou did not directly assert authority, but was fairly influential on her son, who was devoted to her. However, later in his reign, he began to act cruelly and bizarrely, apparently fueled by his alcoholism. In an incident during this period, angry at his alcoholism, she battered him with her staff, stating, "What kind of father begat this kind of son?" He responded irreverently: "I will marry this mother to a Rouran barbarian from the north!" In anger, her expression turned stern. In order to try to induce her to smile, Emperor Wenxuan crawled on the ground, but as he did, he flipped her bed over, causing her to fall and suffer an injury. Once he became sober, he greatly regretted his action, and he set a fire, intending to jump into it. Alarmed, she grabbed him and forced a smile, stating, "You were simply drunk." He still prostrated himself and ordered his father Gao Huan's distant cousin Gao Guiyan (高歸彥) the Prince of Pingqin to batter him severely with a staff—stating to Gao Guiyan that if Gao Guiyan could not cause him to bleed, he would kill Gao Guiyan. However, Empress Dowager Lou grabbed him and would not permit it to happen. He still insisted on being at least battered on his feet 50 times, and then still apologized profusely to her and swore to abstain from alcohol. However, 10 days later, he resumed drinking. In another incident involving Emperor Wenxuan's errant behavior, he had considered seizing his wife Empress Li Zu'e's older sister as a concubine, after forcing her into an affair with him, so he summoned her husband Yuan Ang (元昂) to the palace and fired arrows at him, eventually killing him. Empress Li mourned greatly and offered to yield the empress title to her sister, and Empress Dowager Lou interceded against his taking her sister, and so Emperor Wenxuan did not do so.

Another son of Empress Dowager Lou's, Gao Yan the Prince of Changshan, was one of the few officials who dared to speak to Emperor Wenxuan to try to get him to change his behavior. While at times Emperor Wenxuan would listen to Gao Yan's advice, in one instance he angrily battered Gao Yan such that Gao Yan suffered a serious injury. In anger, Gao Yan went on hunger strike, and when Empress Dowager Lou saw this, she went on hunger strike as well. Emperor Wenxuan, fearful of what might happen to both Gao Yan and Empress Dowager Lou, allowed Gao Yan's associate Wang Xi (王晞), whom Emperor Wenxuan had earlier ordered to forced labor, to be freed from the labor so that he could encourage Gao Yan to end his hunger strike. Wang did so, and Gao Yan relented.

In 558, Emperor Wenxuan died from a severe alcoholism-related illness. He was succeeded by his crown prince Gao Yin, who took the throne as Emperor Fei. Emperor Fei honored Empress Dowager Lou as grand empress dowager.

== During Emperor Fei's reign ==
Grand Empress Dowager Lou initially had considered trying to make Gao Yan emperor instead, but was prevented from doing so by officials loyal to Emperor Wenxuan's choice of his son Emperor Fei as crown prince. Still, she asserted more authority than she did during Emperor Wenxuan's reign. For example, she had long hated Gao Huan's son by his concubine Lady You, Gao Shi (高湜) the Prince of Gaoyang, as Gao Shi had received Emperor Wenxuan's favor by flattering him and had often been put in charge by Emperor Wenxuan of battering other imperial princes. In spring 560, Gao Shi was accused of crimes, and Grand Empress Dowager Lou took this opportunity to order that he be battered severely, and Gao Shi eventually died from his injuries.

Meanwhile, the prime minister Yang Yin—a son-in-law of Grand Empress Dowager Lou, as he had married the former wife of Eastern Wei's Emperor Xiaojing after Emperor Wenxuan killed him around the new year 552—became suspicious that Gao Yan or another son of Grand Empress Dowager Lou, Gao Zhan the Prince of Changguang would try to seize the throne. Yang's associates Kezhuhun Tianhe (可朱渾天和) and Yan Zixian (燕子獻) were even considering killing the two princes and putting Grand Empress Dowager Lou under house arrest and transferring her authority to Emperor Fei's mother Empress Dowager Li. However, what they considered were leaked to Grand Empress Dowager Lou by Empress Dowager Li's lady in waiting Li Changyi (李昌儀), and the two princes took preemptive action, ambushing Yang and his associates and forcing them into the palace. Yang and his associates were executed, and power fell into the hands of Gao Yan. (Note: Despite Grand Empress Dowager Lou's opposition of Yang's plans, however, she realized that he was acting out of his loyalty to Emperor Fei. Lou personally mourned him, and because before his death, one of Yang's eyes had been battered out of its socket, she ordered that a replacement eye be made of gold from the royal treasury and pressed it into Yang's eye socket, saying, "This is an expression of my will.") (Note: When Empress Dowager Lou asked for Yang Yin's whereabouts, Heba Ren replied that Yang had lost an eye.) (Note: Lou personally attended Yang's wake and made the comment, "Lord Yang was faithful and suffered for his faithfulness." Hu Sanxing wrote that Empress Dowager Lou's words here were from her conscience and sense of right and wrong.)

Later that year, Gao Yan decided to take the throne. When he initially reported this intention to Grand Empress Dowager Lou, she disagreed with it, as she believed that this would be seen as usurpation. However, she eventually agreed, and she issued an edict deposing Emperor Fei, creating him the Prince of Ji'nan instead, and making Gao Yan emperor (as Emperor Xiaozhao). She specifically instructed Emperor Xiaozhao, however, "Do not let anything happen to your nephew." With the emperor again being her son rather than grandson, she became known again simply as empress dowager.

== During Emperor Xiaozhao's reign ==
Emperor Xiaozhao was considered filially pious, and when once she became ill, he attended her for 40 days without resting. On another occasion, when she was suffering from unbearable chest pain, he inflicted pain on his own palms—then considered a way to transfer pain from her to him.

In 561, Emperor Xiaozhao, fearful of astrological signs that appear to indicate that the former Emperor Fei would return to the throne, put him to death. When soon thereafter, Emperor Xiaozhao had a riding accident and suffered a severe injury, Empress Dowager Lou attended to him, but as she did, she asked where the Prince of Ji'nan was. When Emperor Xiaozhao was unable to answer, she angrily stated, "Is it not that you killed him? You did not listen to me, and you deserve to die." She walked out without returning. He died soon thereafter, after issuing an edict passing the throne to Gao Zhan, who then took the throne as Emperor Wucheng. Empress Dowager Lou continued to be empress dowager.

== During Emperor Wucheng's reign ==
In summer 562, Empress Dowager Lou died. Emperor Wucheng was unwilling to change to white mourning clothes, and continued to wear his red robe, and he also continued to feast and play music, throwing the white mourning clothes away. When his trusted advisor He Shikai requested that the music be stopped, Emperor Wucheng was sufficiently angry that he slapped He. She was buried with her husband Gao Huan, with honors due an empress.
