= Ko Sung-kuk =

South Korean political scientist

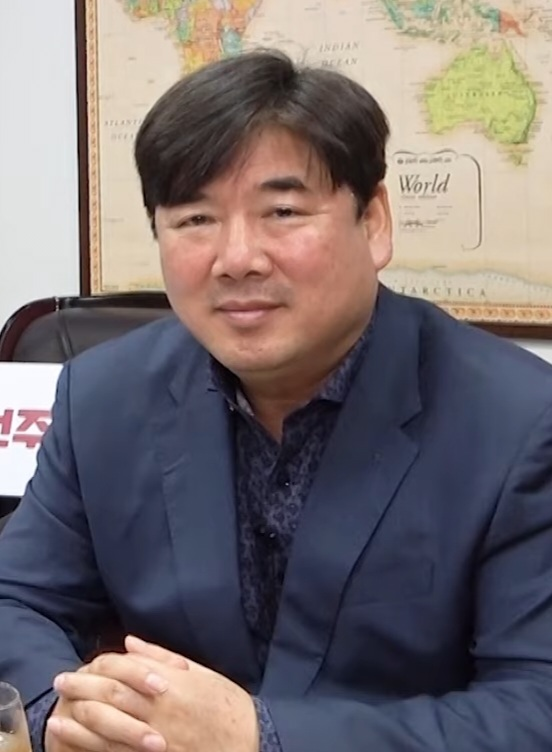

Korean name
- Hangul: 고성국
- Hanja: 高成國
- RR: Go Seongguk
- MR: Ko Sŏngguk

Ko Sung-kuk (born 1958) is a South Korean political scientist.

During his career as an instructor for the Political Science Department at Korea University, the authorities sentenced Ko Sung-kuk to 3 years of imprisonment, and to a 3-year suspension of teaching license under the National Security Act on November 27, 1986.

== Works ==
- Ko, Sung-kuk, 고성국의 정치IN, 미지애드컴 (June 11, 2011), ISBN 978-89-957714-4-0
- Ko, Sung-kuk, 10대와 만나는 정치와 민주주의, 철수와영희 (May 5, 2011), ISBN 978-89-93463-13-2
- Ko, Sung-kuk, Chang, Ha-Joon, et al., 불량사회와 그 적들, 도서출판 기파랑Guiparang Publishing (April 25, 2011), ISBN 978-89-965171-2-2
- Ko, Sung-kuk, 10대와 통하는 정치학, 철수와영희 (December 19, 2007), ISBN 978-89-958338-5-8
