= Go Bong-jae =

South Korean baseball player (born 1993)

- Pitcher
- Born: 14 May 1993 (age 32); Busan, South Korea
- Batted: Right Threw: Right

KBO debut
- 7 May 2016, for the Doosan Bears

Last KBO appearance
- 9 June 2023, for the Doosan Bears

KBO statistics
- Win–loss record: 3–0
- Earned run average: 6.81
- Strikeouts: 25

Teams
- Doosan Bears (2016–2023)

Go Bong-jae (Korean: 고봉재; born 14 May 1993) is a South Korean professional baseball pitcher who played for the Doosan Bears of the KBO League. He is a sidearm pitcher. He graduated from Howon University and was selected for the Doosan Bears by a draft in 2016 (2nd draft, 3rd round).

== play style ==
The right-handed sidearm pitcher is considered to have a slow fastball that sits in the low-to-mid 90s, but he has a reliable breaking ball and a serviceable changeup. He uses a four-seam fastball to work the count, a slider as his deciding pitch, and a changeup as his third pitch.
