= Emperor Wucheng of Northern Qi =

Emperor Wucheng of Northern Qi 北齊武成帝

Emperor of Northern Qi
- Reign: December 3, 561–June 8, 565
- Predecessor: Emperor Xiaozhao
- Successor: Gao Wei
- Born: 537
- Died: January 13, 569
- Burial: Yongping Mausoleum (永平陵)
Full name
- Family name: Gāo (高); Given name: Zhàn (湛)
Era dates
- Tàiníng (太寧): 561-562; Héqīng (河清): 562-565
Posthumous name
- Wǔchéng (武成, lit. "martial and successful")
Temple name
- Shìzǔ (世祖)
- House: Gao
- Dynasty: Northern Qi
- Father: Gao Huan
- Mother: Lou Zhaojun

Emperor Wucheng of Northern Qi ((北)齊武成帝) (537–569), personal name Gao Zhan (高湛; (Note: He should not be confused with an Eastern Wei general of the same name, whose courtesy name was "Zicheng" (子澄). Gao Zicheng was a son of Gao Zhao. His epitaph had been found, and its inscription was recorded in vol.57 of Quan Houwei Wen (全后魏文).) also romanized as Gao Dan), nickname Buluoji (步落稽), was the fourth emperor of the Chinese Northern Qi dynasty. In traditional Chinese historiography, he was presented as a minimally competent ruler who devoted much of his time to feasting and pleasure-seeking, neglecting the affairs of the state. The state was governed with assistance from his adviser He Shikai and other appointed administrators. In 565, he passed the throne to his young son Gao Wei, taking the title Taishang Huang (retired emperor), but continued to make key decisions. He died in 569 at the age of 31, and the Northern Qi would fall in 577.

== Background ==
Gao Zhan was born in 537, as the fourth of six sons of Eastern Wei's paramount general Gao Huan and his wife Lou Zhaojun (and Gao Huan's ninth son overall). He was greatly favoured by his father due to his exceptionally good looks. In 544, Gao Huan, in order to try to form an alliance with Rouran, took, as a wife for Gao Zhan, a daughter of Rouran's Khan Yujiulü Anluochen, who carried the title of Princess Linhe. At their public wedding ceremony, Gao Zhan was said to be appropriate in his actions despite his young age, surprising the guests. (Note: This was the only historical reference to Princess Linhe, who was not again mentioned among Gao Zhan's consorts, and she was eventually not created his empress, implying that she had either died by the time he became emperor or had effectively been divorced.) He was later created the Duke of Changguang. After the deaths of Gao Huan and Gao Zhan's oldest brother Gao Cheng, another brother Gao Yang became regent, and in 550, he had Emperor Xiaojing of Eastern Wei yield the throne to him, ending Eastern Wei and establishing Northern Qi as its Emperor Wenxuan. Gao Zhan, as a younger brother to the emperor, was created the Prince of Changguang.

== During Emperor Wenxuan's reign ==
Emperor Wenxuan's reign was initially a diligent one, but eventually turned violent and degenerate. When he was drunk, he was accustomed to battering his brothers, including Gao Zhan; two of his brothers, Gao Jun (高浚) the Prince of Yong'an and Gao Huan (高渙, courtesy name "Jingshou" [敬寿]) the Prince of Shangdang, were imprisoned and later killed cruelly. (Note: It was said that Gao Zhan had a hand in their deaths, as Emperor Wenxuan considered releasing them around the year 559, but Gao Zhan, who had a hateful relationship with Gao Jun, told Emperor Wenxuan, "How can you let fierce tigers out of their cages?" Emperor Wenxuan agreed and had them killed.) During this period, Gao Zhan closely associated with He Shikai and Zu Ting, even calling them brothers—and both of them would eventually have key roles in his administration.

== During Emperor Fei's and Xiaozhao's reigns ==
In late 559, Emperor Wenxuan died and was succeeded by his son Gao Yin (as Emperor Fei). Pursuant to Emperor Wenxuan's will, the government was in the hands of several of his trusted officials -- Yang Yin the Prince of Kaifeng, Gao Guiyan (高歸彥) the Prince of Pingqin, Yan Zixian (燕子獻), and Zheng Yi (鄭頤). These officials (except for Gao Guiyan) were distrustful of Gao Zhan and his older brother Gao Yan the Prince of Changshan, believing that, as the young emperor's honored uncles, they posed a threat to the emperor. Meanwhile, the ambitious Yang was carrying out a governmental reorganization scheme to trim unnecessary offices and titles and to remove incompetent officials. The officials who were hurt by Yang's actions became disaffected and largely hoped that Gao Yan and Gao Zhan would take action and began to encourage them to do so. Yang considered sending Gao Yan and Gao Zhan outside the capital to be provincial governors, but Emperor Fei initially disagreed. Yang wrote a submission to Emperor Fei's mother Empress Dowager Li to ask her to consider, and she consulted her lady in waiting Li Changyi (李昌儀), who leaked the news to Grand Empress Dowager Lou. She informed the two princes, and in summer 560, they set up an ambush, with Gao Guiyan and the generals Heba Ren (賀拔仁) and Hulü Jin, at a ceremony where Gao Yan was to be named to a ceremonial post. Yang, Kezhuhun, Yan, Zheng, and Song Qindao (宋欽道) were all seized and severely battered (at Gao Zhan's order). Gao Yan and Gao Zhan then entered the palace and publicly accused Yang and his associates of crimes; Yang and his associates were executed, and Gao Yan took control of the government. He soon went to take up post at the secondary capital Jinyang (晉陽, in modern Taiyuan, Shanxi), controlling the government remotely, leaving the capital Yecheng in Gao Zhan's control.

Later in 560, Gao Yan, after his advisors persuaded him that if he allowed Emperor Fei to remain emperor, his relationship with the young emperor would never be healed and he would be in danger, persuaded Grand Empress Dowager Lou of the same. She issued an edict deposing Emperor Fei and making Gao Yan emperor (as Emperor Xiaozhao). Emperor Xiaozhao continued to take up residence at Jinyang, again leaving Gao Zhan in control at Yecheng.

The relationship between the brothers began to sour, however, because while Emperor Xiaozhao had promised Gao Zhan that he would be made crown prince, soon created his own son Gao Bainian crown prince instead. In 561, Emperor Xiaozhao tried to transfer some of Gao Zhan's authorities at Yecheng to Hulü Jin's son Hulü Xian (斛律羨), but Gao Zhan refused to transfer that authority. Meanwhile, sorcerers informed Emperor Xiaozhao that the imperial aura was still at Yecheng, making Emperor Xiaozhao concerned. Gao Guiyan, who was concerned that Gao Yin would one day take the throne again and retaliate against him, persuaded Emperor Xiaozhao that his nephew had to be removed, and so Emperor Xiaozhao issued an edict to summon the Prince of Ji'nan to Jinyang. Gao Zhan, was disappointed at Emperor Xiaozhao not created him crown prince, briefly considered redeclaring Gao Yin emperor and starting a rebellion against Emperor Xiaozhao, but ultimately chose not to do it, as his own sorcerers informed him that they believed that he would become emperor one day anyway. He therefore sent Gao Yin to Jinyang, and soon, Emperor Xiaozhao had Gao Yin killed.

Emperor Xiaozhao himself did not live long after. In winter 561, while hunting, Emperor Xiaozhao's horse was spooked by a rabbit, and he fell off the horse and suffered broken ribs. Soon, believing himself to be near death, he issued an edict stating that Gao Bainian was too young to take the throne, and that the throne was instead to be passed to Gao Zhan. He also wrote a letter to Gao Zhan, stating, "Bainian is innocent. You can do anything with him, but please do not kill him!" He died later that day. Gao Zhan, after first sending close associates to make sure that Emperor Xiaozhao was in fact dead, soon arrived at Jinyang and took the throne (as Emperor Wucheng).

== Reign as emperor ==
In spring 562, Emperor Wucheng created his wife Princess Hu empress and her son Gao Wei crown prince.

Also in spring 562, Emperor Wucheng, agreeing with his officials Gao Yuanhai (高元海), Bi Yiyun (畢義雲), and Gao Qianhe (高乾和) that Gao Guiyan was unreliable, removed Gao Guiyan from his position and made him the governor of Ji Province (冀州, roughly modern Hengshui, Hebei). When Gao Guiyan got to Ji Province, his subordinate Lü Sili (呂思禮) reported him as planning a rebellion, and Emperor Wucheng sent the senior generals Duan Shao and Lou Rui (婁叡) against him; they quickly defeated him, and he was executed along with his sons and grandsons.

In summer 562, Empress Dowager Lou died, but Emperor Wucheng refused to wear white mourning clothes and continued to wear his red robe and continued to feast and play music. When He Shikai advised him to stop the music, Emperor Wucheng was angry enough that he slapped He Shikai, normally a close confidant.

Sometime after Emperor Wucheng assumed the throne, he began to force Empress Li Zu'e, the mother of his predecessor Gao Yin to have a sexual relationship with him—threatening her that he would kill her son Gao Shaode (高紹德) the Prince of Taiyuan if she did not agree. Eventually, she became pregnant, and in shame, she began to refuse seeing Gao Shaode. Gao Shaode found out that she was pregnant and became indignant. In shame, when she bore a daughter around the new year 563, she threw the infant away, causing the child's death. When Emperor Wucheng found out, he became angry, and he stated, "Because you killed my daughter, I will kill your son." He summoned Gao Shaode and, in her presence, beat him to death with the hilt of a sword. She cried bitterly, and Emperor Wucheng, in anger, stripped her and pounded her. She suffered severe injuries, but eventually recovered, and Emperor Wucheng expelled her from the palace to be a Buddhist nun.

By 563, He Shikai had become so favored and trusted by Emperor Wucheng that Emperor Wucheng could not bear not seeing him, often requiring him to stay at the palace. Whenever He Shikai would go home, Emperor Wucheng would soon summon him to the palace again, and he rewarded He Shikai with great wealth. They participated in what were described as "immoral games" together, lacking boundaries between emperor and subject. He Shikai thereafter started an affair with Empress Hu. He Shikai stated to Emperor Wucheng:

Ever since ancient times, all kings and emperors have turned to dust. What difference is there between Emperors Yao and Shun [two mythical kind emperors] and Jie of Xia and King Zhou of Shang [two legendary cruel kings]? your Imperial Majesty should, while you are still young and strong, enjoy life as much as possible and do whatever you wish. One day of extraordinary happiness is as great as one thousand years of ordinary living. Entrust the affairs of the state to the high level officials, and do not worry that they would not be done. Do not mistreat yourself and make yourself unable to do anything.

Emperor Wucheng, persuaded, entrusted the civil service system to Zhao Yanshen (趙彥深), financial matters to Gao Wenyao (高文遙), the civilian administration over military affairs to Tang Yong (唐邕), and the education of Crown Prince Wei to Empress Hu's brother-in-law Feng Zicong (馮子琮) and cousin Hu Changcan (胡長璨). He himself only attended meetings with his ministers every three to four days, and he would often make short appearances and make several quick approvals and then end the meeting. When Gao Cheng's son Gao Xiaoyu (高孝瑜) tried to get him to look into He Shikai's relationship with Empress Hu, He Shikai and Gao Rui (高叡) the Prince of Zhao Commandery (Emperor Wucheng's cousin) -- whom Gao Xiaoyu had also advised Emperor Wucheng to distance himself from since Gao Rui's father Gao Chen (高琛) had died from Gao Huan's caning after he had an affair with Gao Huan's concubine Lady Erzhu—jointly accused Gao Xiaoyu falsely of plotting rebellion. In summer 563, when Emperor Wucheng received report that Gao Xiaoyu had a secret conversation with Emperor Wucheng's concubine Consort Erzhu, he poisoned Gao Xiaoyu to death.

In winter 563, rival Northern Zhou launched a major two-prong attack on Northern Qi, with the southern prong, commanded by Daxi Wu (達奚武), attacking Pingyang (平陽, in modern Linfen, Shanxi) and the northern prong, commanded by Yang Zhong (楊忠), attacking Northern Qi from the north, in alliance with Tujue. Emperor Wucheng sent the general Hulü Guang (Hulü Jin's son) to resist the southern prong of the Northern Zhou attack, and personally went to Jinyang to resist the northern prong, but when he got to Jinyang, he was surprised by how strong the Northern Zhou and Tujue forces were, and he considered fleeing, stopping his flight only after opposition by Gao Rui and Gao Xiaowan (高孝琬) the Prince of Hejian. In spring 564, however, Duan Shao was able to defeat Yang, forcing him to flee, and the Tujue forces and Daxi soon withdrew. Still, the Northern Qi territory north of Jinyang had been pillaged by Tujue.

Also in spring 564, the one major accomplishment of Emperor Wucheng's reign—a revision of Northern Wei's criminal code—was completed, allowing greater fairness in the application of laws. Further, Emperor Wucheng was interested in greater promulgation of the laws, and he ordered the children of officials' households to study them, leading to a wider base of legal knowledge than previously had been the case. He further formalized the tax code as well, not only trying to make the tax burden fairer, but also created a system where adults without land ownership were distributed lands to farm on, to encourage food production.

In summer 564, there were astrological signs that portended ill fortune for the emperor, and Emperor Wucheng thought of deflecting that ill fortune on his nephew Gao Bainian. At that same time, Gao Bainian's teacher Jia Dezhou (賈德冑) submitted several instances of the character chi (敕) -- a character that meant "imperial edict," and which only the emperor was supposed to use—that Gao Bainian had written, to Emperor Wucheng. Emperor Wucheng summoned Gao Bainian to the palace, and, after ordering him to write chi to make certain that the handwriting fit what Jia submitted, had his guards batter Gao Bainian severely, beheading him after he was already severely injured.

Meanwhile, the Northern Zhou regent Yuwen Hu had sent the official Yin Gongzheng (尹公正) to offer peace in return for his mother Lady Yan and his aunt (the younger sister of his father Yuwen Hao (宇文顥) and uncle Yuwen Tai). Emperor Wucheng, fearful that Northern Zhou and Tujue would launch another attack, agreed, and first sent Lady Yuwen to Northern Zhou. However, he initially detained Lady Yan and had her and Yuwen Hu exchange letters, trying to extract promises from Yuwen Hu. Despite Duan's suggestion that he negotiate formal concessions, Emperor Wucheng, in fear of Yuwen Hu's anger, released Lady Yan in fall 564. However, in winter 564, when Tujue launched an attack on Northern Qi's northern provinces, Yuwen Hu, fearful that Tujue would believe that he was duplicitous, launched an attack on Northern Qi anyway, against the key city Luoyang. Around the new year 565, Duan and Gao Changgong (高長恭) the Prince of Lanling defeated Northern Zhou forces sieging Luoyang, and Northern Zhou forces withdrew.

Around this time, Zu Ting had been persuading He Shikai that his fortunes were tied to the emperor's -- and that if the emperor shall die, he would be in a desperate situation—and that he could solve this by suggesting Emperor Wucheng to pass the throne to Crown Prince Wei, so that both the crown prince and Empress Hu would be grateful to him as well. He Shikai agreed, and both he and Zu offered the suggestion to Emperor Wucheng—stating to him that astrological signs indicating that the imperial position would be changed was a sign that he should pass the throne, particularly because it would be even more honored to be the father of an emperor than to be an emperor. Emperor Wucheng agreed, and in summer 565, he passed the throne to the eight-year-old Crown Prince Wei, creating Gao Wei's wife Crown Princess Hulü (Hulü Guang's daughter) empress. Emperor Wucheng took the title Taishang Huang (retired emperor).

== As retired emperor ==
Due to Gao Wei's young age, Emperor Wucheng continued to be in control of major decisions, despite his "retirement." Favoring another son of his and Empress Hu's, Gao Yan (note different character than Emperor Xiaozhao) the Prince of Dongping greatly, even though Gao Yan was even younger than Gao Wei, he piled many honors and titles on Gao Yan, and Gao Yan, who was considered more intelligent and resolute than Gao Wei, at times questioned why Gao Wei was the emperor. Emperor Wucheng and Empress Hu considered deposing Gao Wei and replacing him with Gao Yan, but ultimately did not do so.

In 566, with He Shikai and Zu Ting falsely accusing Gao Xiaowan (his nephew, through Gao Cheng) of plotting rebellion, Emperor Wucheng arrested Gao Xiaowan and tortured him, eventually breaking his legs. Gao Xiaowan died from the injuries, and when Gao Xiaowan's younger brother Gao Yanzong mourned Gao Xiaowan, Emperor Wucheng arrested and tortured Gao Yanzong as well, but did not kill him.

In 567, Zu, hungry for greater power, accused Zhao Yanshen, Gao Wenhao, and He Shikai of corruption and factionalism, but Zhao, Gao, and He Shikai received word of this prior to Zu's submission and make defenses of themselves first. Emperor Wucheng arrested Zu and interrogated him. During the interrogation, Zu offended Emperor Wucheng by pointing out that he should not be hoarding as many ladies in waiting as he had been and by comparing him to Xiang Yu—although as Zu then pointed out, Emperor Wucheng's accomplishments paled in comparison to Xiang's. Emperor Wucheng, angry, whipped Zu 200 times and had him imprisoned in a dungeon—and during that imprisonment, Zu's eyes, smoked by smoke from the lamp (which was burning Chinese cabbage seed as the light source) went blind.

In spring 568, Emperor Wucheng suffered a major illness, and the official Xu Zhicai (徐之才), who was an accomplished physician, treated him back to health. After Emperor Wucheng recovered, however, He Shikai, whose position was lower than Xu's, wanted to be promoted, and so had Xu sent out to Yan Province (兗州, roughly modern Jining, Shandong) to be governor. In winter 568, Emperor Wucheng suddenly fell ill again, and he summoned Xu. Before Xu could arrive, however, around the new year 569, he died, while holding He Shikai's hands and entrusting the important matters to him.

== Family ==
Consorts and Issue:

- Princess Linhe, of the Yujiulü clan (鄰和公主 鬱久閭氏; 538–550), personal name Chidelian (叱地連), buried in the Tomb of Princess Linhe
- Empress Wucheng, of the Hu clan of Anding (武成皇后 安定胡氏)
  - Gao Wei, Emperor (皇帝 高緯; 556–577), second son
  - Gao Yan, Emperor Gong'ai of Chu (楚恭哀皇帝 高儼; 557–571), third son
- Furen, of the Li clan of Zhao (弘德夫人 趙郡李氏; d. 574)
  - Gao Chuo, Prince of Nanyang (南陽王 高綽; 556–574), first son
- Lady, of the Ren clan (任氏)
  - Gao Renzhi, Prince of Danyang (丹陽王 高仁直; d. 577), 12th son
- Lady, of the Li clan of Zhao (趙郡李氏), personal name Zu'e (祖娥)
  - A daughter (562)
- Unknown
  - Gao Kuo, Prince An of Qi (齊安王 高廓; d. 577), fourth son
  - Gao Zhen, Prince of Beiping (北平王 高貞; d. 577), fifth son
  - Gao Renying, Prince of Gaoping (高平王 高仁英; d. 594), sixth son
  - Gao Renguang, Prince of Huainan (淮南王 高仁光; d. 577), seventh son
  - Gao Renji, Prince of Xihe (西河王 高仁幾; d. 577), eighth son
  - Gao Renyong, Prince of Leping (樂平王 高仁邕; d. 577), ninth son (Note: adopted by Empress Wucheng)
  - Gao Renjian, Prince of Yingchuan (潁川王 高仁儉; d. 577), tenth son
  - Gao Renya, Prince of Anle (安樂王 高仁雅), 11th son
  - Gao Renqian, Prince of Donghai (東海王 高仁謙; d. 577), 13th son
  - Princess Yongchang (永昌公主; d. 562)
  - Princess Dong'an (東安公主)
    - Married Duan Shen of Wuwei, Prince of Jibei (武威 段深) in 564

== Notes ==
Regnal titles
Preceded by Emperor Xiaozhao of Northern Qi	Emperor of Northern Qi; 561–565	Succeeded by Gao Wei
