= Koh Young-hee =

North Korean dancer (born 1958)

- Born: Koh Young-hee; 1958 (age 67–68); Pyongyang, North Korea
- Other names: Cho Young-hee
- Occupations: Dancer; Choreographer; Human rights activist
- Years active: 1975 - present
- Children: 1
- Parent: Bae Geum-ee (mother)

Koh Young-hee (Korean: 고영희; born 1958) is a North Korean defector, dancer, and cultural activist. A prominent figure in the Pyongyang artistic elite before her defection in 2012, she is the daughter of North Korean choreographer Bae Geum-ee. Koh is recognized in South Korea for her efforts to preserve the dance legacy of Choi Seung-hee, the "Mother of Korean Dance."

== Early life and education ==
Koh was born in 1958 in Pyongyang, North Korea. She was raised in a highly educated and artistic household; her father was a high-ranking official fluent in five languages, and her mother, Bae Geum-ee, was one of North Korea's most respected choreographers.

Bae Geum-ee was an original member of the first North Korean dance troupe founded in the 1940s by dancer Choi Seung-hee. Growing up, Koh studied dance directly under her mother and observed the techniques of Choi Seung-hee, who was later purged by the regime. Koh began dancing in kindergarten and eventually attended North Korea's prestigious Music and Dance University.

== Career in North Korea ==
From 1975 to 1983, Koh served as one of six "solo" dancers at the State National Art Troupe in Pyongyang, the most prestigious performance group in the country. During her career, she taught and performed alongside other elite dancers, including Ko Yong-hui (the mother of current leader Kim Jong-un), whom Koh described as "exceptional and kind".

== Political Persecution ==
Despite her status, Koh's family fell victim to the regime's volatile cultural politics. In 1984, Kim Jong-il expressed personal dissatisfaction with a specific dance piece performed by Koh and choreographed by her mother. As a result, the family was purged from Pyongyang and sent to a remote mining region in Ryanggang Province. Koh was forced to perform manual labor as a miner for two years before her mother was eventually reinstated in the capital.

== Defection ==
Following the death of her husband, a former military officer, in 1997, Koh lived as a dance teacher in Cheongjin. In 2008, her daughter defected to South Korea without Koh's knowledge. Upon discovering this, and facing the continued hardships of life in the North, Koh fled the country in June 2011, officially arriving in South Korea in 2012.

== Personal life ==
Koh is often noted for her "dancer's posture"—slim and poised even in her late 60s. She resides in Seoul, where she reunited with her daughter after her 2012 defection.

== Activism and Legacy ==
Since resettling in Seoul, Koh has become a vital link to the "lost" history of Korean modern dance. She performs and teaches the "Choi Seung-hee style," characterized by distinctive, fluid arm movements and a blend of traditional Korean themes with modern sensibilities. She has provided rare first-hand accounts of the inner workings of North Korean state art troupes and the private lives of the Kim family members she encountered during her career. She remains active in the South Korean arts community, working to ensure that the choreography of her mother and the legacy of Choi Seung-hee are preserved for future generations.
