= Emperor Wenxuan of Northern Qi =

Emperor of Northern Qi from 550 to 559

Emperor Wenxuan of Northern Qi 北齊文宣帝
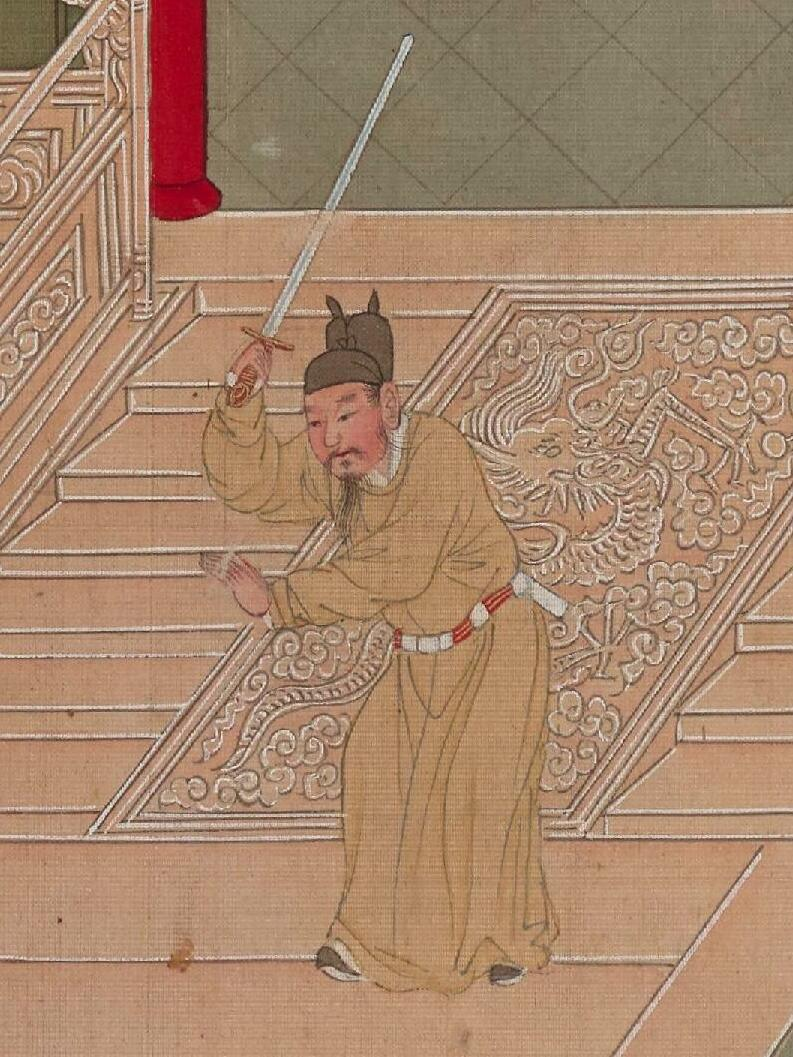

Emperor of Northern Qi
- Reign: June 9, 550 – November 25, 559
- Successor: Gao Yin
- Born: 526 (Note: Although both Book of Northern Qi and History of Northern Dynasties recorded that Emperor Wenxuan died at 30, History of Northern Dynasties also recorded that Emperor Wenxuan was born in a Year of the Horse; his birth year therefore should be 526 rather than 530, which was a Year of the Dog. Book of Northern Qi also mentioned that when Gao Yang was an infant, Gao Huan was so poor that he and his relatives would suffer cold and hunger, but around 529 Gao Huan had already become the prefect of Jin and thus should not be poor. So the birth year of Gao Yang should be 526, not 530.)
- Died: November 25, 559 (aged 32–33)
- Burial: Wuning Mausoleum (武寧陵)
- Consorts: Empress Zhaoxin
- Issue: Gao Yin; Gao Shaode; Gao Shaoyi; Gao Shaoren; Gao Shaolian; Princess Changle; Princess Zhongshan; Princess Yining
Full name
- Family name: Gāo (高); Given name: Yáng (洋)
Era name and dates
- Tiānbǎo (天保): June 9, 550 – February 12, 560
Posthumous name
- Emperor Wénxuān (文宣皇帝) ("civil and responsible"), briefly Emperor Jǐngliè (景烈皇帝) ("decisive and achieving") (565–570)
Temple name
- Xiǎnzu (顯祖), briefly Wēizōng (威宗)(565–570), Gāozu (高祖)(until 565)
- House: Gao
- Dynasty: Northern Qi
- Father: Gao Huan
- Mother: Lou Zhaojun

Emperor Wenxuan of (Northern) Qi ((北)齊文宣帝) (526–559), personal name Gao Yang (高洋, Wade–Giles: Kao Yang), courtesy name Zijin (子進), Xianbei nickname Hounigan (侯尼干), was the founding emperor of the Northern Qi dynasty of China. He was the second son of the Eastern Wei's paramount general Gao Huan. Following the death of his brother and Gao Huan's designated successor and eldest son Gao Cheng in 549, Gao Yang became the regent of Eastern Wei. In 550, he forced the Emperor Xiaojing of Eastern Wei to yield the throne to him, ending the Eastern Wei dynasty and starting the Northern Qi dynasty.

Early in Emperor Wenxuan's reign, he was known for attentiveness to military matters, and the strength of the Northern Qi military was at its prime. He also tried to equalize the tax burden and reduce corruption by offering officials sufficient salary. He entrusted most governmental matters to the capable Yang Yin, and for a while, the government was effective, and the military was strong. In his later years, Emperor Wenxuan suffered from alcoholism and possibly untreated psychiatric disorder. Chinese historical annals recorded his bloody rages. Nevertheless, his reign, with assistance from his advisers, was considered well-administered and effective.

== Early life ==
Gao Yang was born in 526, while his father Gao Huan was a general under Northern Wei's paramount general Erzhu Rong. His mother Lou Zhaojun was Gao Huan's wife, on whose financial support Gao's early career had relied on. Lou Zhaojun was from a wealthy Xianbei family. He was their second son, after his older brother Gao Cheng. After Erzhu Rong's death in 530, Gao Huan overthrew Erzhu's family and became Northern Wei's paramount general, and after Northern Wei divided into Eastern Wei and Western Wei in 534 became the actual power controlling Eastern Wei. Gao Yang thus grew up in a household of power. Gao Yang was a descendant of Jiang Ziya.

Gao Yang was not well regarded as a child, as he was awkward in interpersonal skills and at times considered developmentally disabled, being unable to carry out many tasks common for children, though it appears that he feigned this to prevent suspicion of his elder brother. It appeared that he was actually of fairly high capability in many areas, and once, when Gao Huan tried to test his children's intelligence by giving them tangled balls of yarn to untangle, Gao Yang took out his sword and sliced the ball open, stating that that was the only solution. As Gao Huan's sons grew older, on one occasion, Gao Huan wanted to test their military abilities by having his general Peng Le launch a mock attack on them. All of Gao Huan's sons, including the older Gao Cheng, were fearful, but Gao Yang reacted calmly and actually captured Peng. As he grew, he continued to be awkward and appearing to be unintelligent, and Gao Cheng, in particular, often looked down on him. In 535, Gao Yang was created the Duke of Taiyuan (太原公).

Gao Huan died in 547, and thereafter, Gao Cheng, who had already controlled many aspects of Eastern Wei imperial government's operations, took over as regent. He moved to consolidate his power further, and when Emperor Xiaojing of Eastern Wei tried to form a plot to kill him, he discovered the plot and put Emperor Xiaojing under effective house arrest. He then planned taking the throne himself, but at a meeting in 549 at the capital Yecheng (鄴城, in modern Handan, Hebei), with his officials Chen Yuankang (陳元康), Cui Jishu (崔季舒), and Yang Yin, to discuss the procedure for doing so, he was assassinated by his servant Lan Jing (蘭京), who was angry at his wrongful treatment. At that time, Gao Yang happened to be in Yecheng, and he quickly gathered the guards and killed Lan and his co-conspirators. He chose not to announce Gao Cheng's death immediately, while moving to consolidate power.

== As Eastern Wei regent ==
Initially, Emperor Xiaojing, who had received rumors that Gao Cheng had died, thought he might have a chance to regain power. However, upon meeting Gao Yang, who made a display of force by having more than 8000 guards accompany him, Emperor Xiaojing saw that Gao Yang could not be easily dealt with. Meanwhile, Gao Yang headed for the Gaos' stronghold of Jinyang (晉陽, in modern Taiyuan, Shanxi), and consolidated his military command there, quickly impressing the generals who had previously looked down on him with quick and careful decisions.

In fall and winter 549, with rival Liang dynasty under internal turmoil after the rebellion of Hou Jing (a former Eastern Wei general who had defected to Liang in 547), Gao Yang sent Peng Le to attack the Liang border provinces, taking over the region between the Huai River and Yangtze River with ease.

In spring 550, Gao Yang had Emperor Xiaojing convey on him the greater title of Prince of Qi Commandery. Two months later, his title was made the even greater title of Prince of Qi.

In summer 550, under advice from the officials Gao Dezheng (高德政), Xu Zhicai (徐之才), and Song Jingye (宋景業), Gao Yang decided to take the throne, despite reservations from Gao Yang's mother Princess Dowager Lou. He therefore headed from Jinyang to Yecheng, but even as he was on the way and had reached the halfway city of Pingdu (平都, in modern Jinzhong, Shanxi), the officials largely pretended to ignore his overtures at taking the throne, so he returned to Jinyang. Soon thereafter, he had Emperor Xiaojing issue an edict conferring the nine bestowments on him, further displaying his posture of taking the throne. He then proceeded to Yecheng again, and Emperor Xiaojing yielded the throne to him, ending Eastern Wei and establishing Northern Qi, with Gao Yang as its Emperor Wenxuan. He created the former Emperor Xiaojing the Prince of Zhongshan. He posthumously honored Gao Huan and Gao Cheng as emperors, while honoring his mother as empress dowager.

== Early reign ==
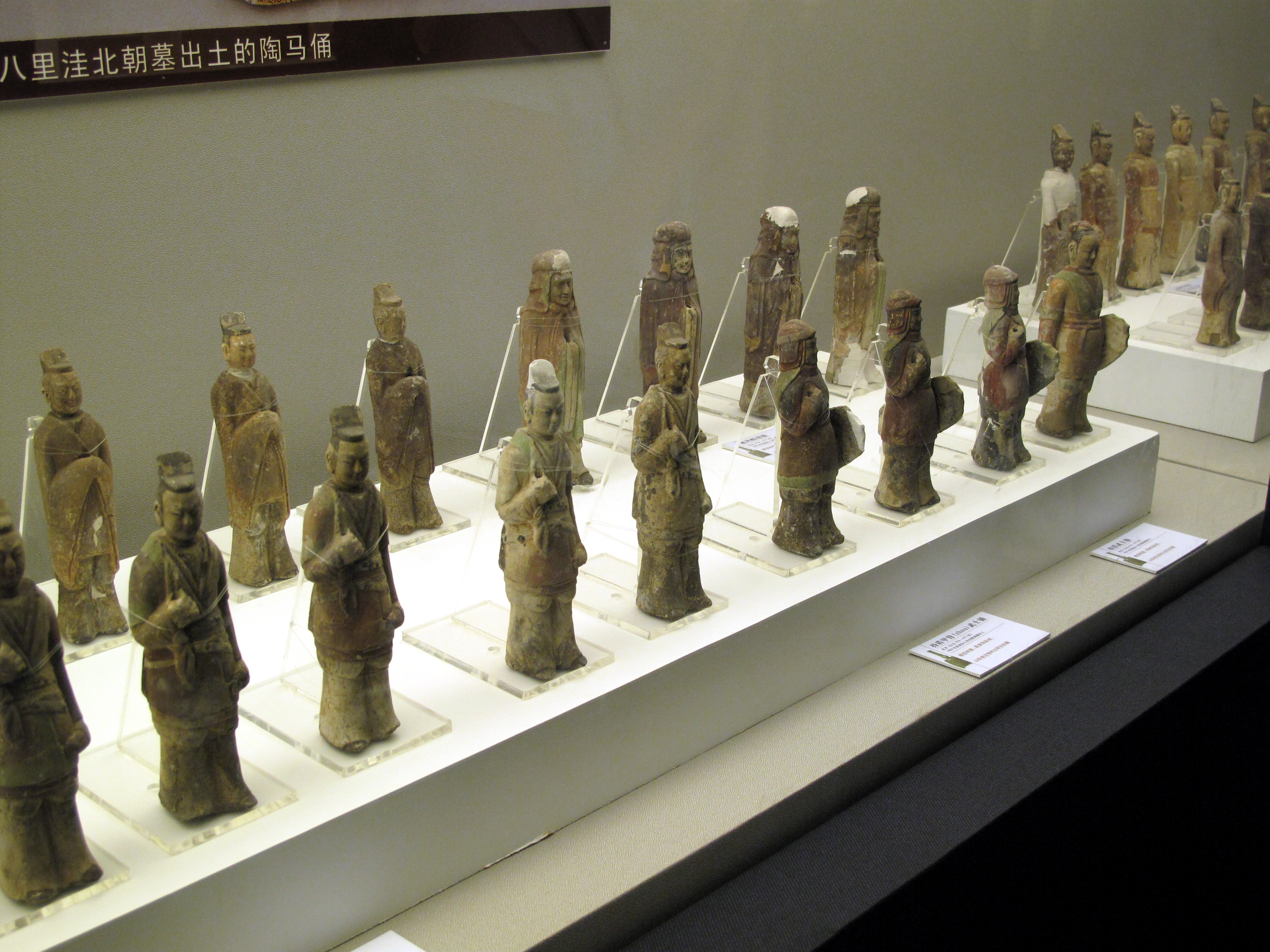
Funerary figurines of soldiers, officers, and officials of Northern Qi

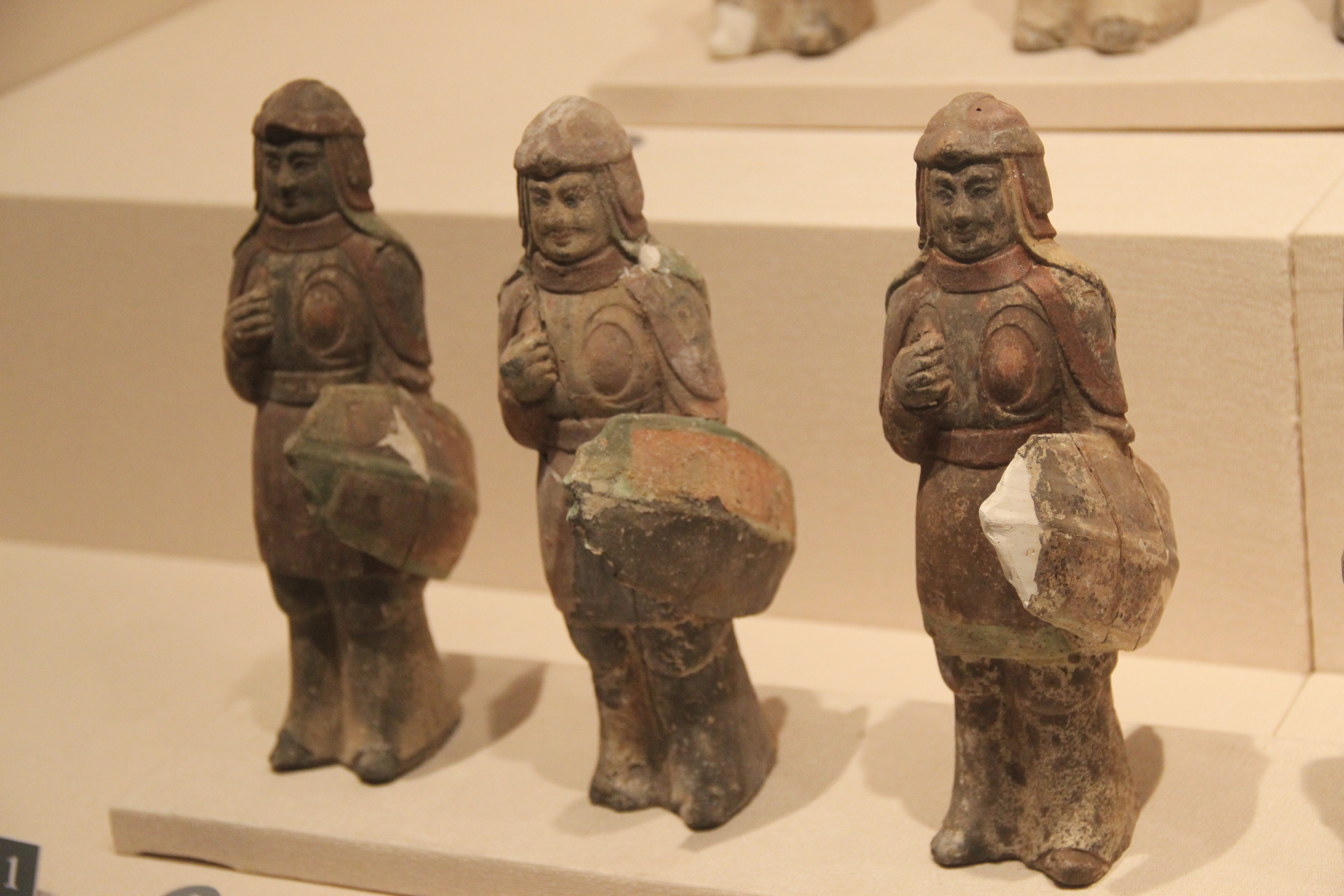
Soldiers of Northern Qi

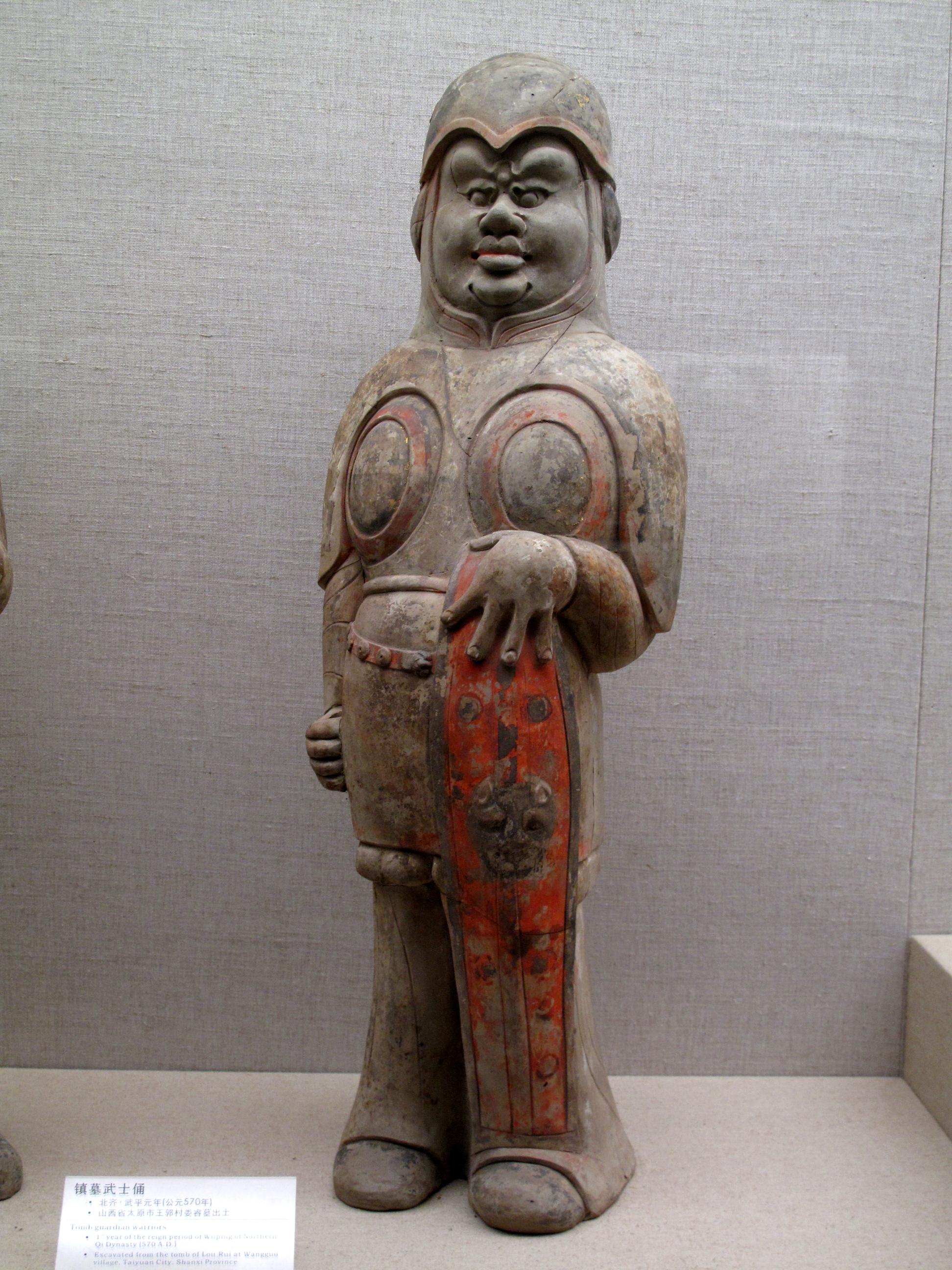
Northern Qi shieldbearer

Early in Emperor Wenxuan's reign, he was known for being attentive to important matters of state, particularly military matters. He revised Eastern Wei laws, and he selected elite soldiers from both Xianbei and Han ethnicities to form the border defense corps. To equalize the tax and labor burden, he divided the households under his rule into nine classes based on their wealth, requiring the wealthy to pay more taxes and the poor to contribute more labor. Continuing a trend set by both his father Gao Huan and his brother Gao Cheng, he divided his time between Yecheng and Jinyang, effectively making Jinyang a second capital.

Just like his father Gao Huan, Emperor Wenxuan viewed himself as more of a Xianbei rather than Han. Further, more than his father did, he was not willing to follow most of the Han traditions. Because of this, Gao Dezheng and another official, Gao Longzhi (高隆之), who wanted to ingratiate themselves with Emperor Wenxuan's cousin and powerful general Duan Shao, suggested he make Duan Shao's sister Lady Duan, a concubine of his, empress. Emperor Wenxuan did not follow their advice and, pursuant to expected norm, created his wife Princess Li Zu'e empress and created her son Gao Yin crown prince.

In response to the establishment of Northern Qi, Yuwen Tai, the paramount general of rival Western Wei, launched a major attack on Northern Qi. Emperor Wenxuan personally led troops to defend against Yuwen's attack. When Yuwen saw that Emperor Wenxuan's troops were well-organized, he sighed and stated, "Gao Huan is not yet dead." He was unable to overcome Emperor Wenxuan's defense and so was forced to withdraw, and in fact lost some border commanderies to Northern Qi in the campaign.

Around the new year 552, Emperor Wenxuan wanted to put the former emperor, the Prince of Zhongshan, to death. He first invited his sister and the prince's wife, the Princess Taiyuan, to a feast. As soon as she left the prince's household, he sent assassins to force the prince to drink poison, and also killed his three sons. He buried the former emperor with imperial honors, but at a later point, for reasons unknown, he dug out the former emperor's casket and threw it into the Zhang River (漳水, flowing near Yecheng).

In spring 552, Emperor Wenxuan himself led troops against the Kumo Xi tribe (in the upper Liao River drainage area) and achieved a great victory. Around the same time, he also sent generals to seize certain border cities with Liang, as Liang troops continued to battle Hou Jing, who declared himself the Emperor of Han in 551 but was subsequently defeated by Emperor Yuan of Liang in 552. The campaigns of seizing Liang cities continued even after Hou's defeat, although he did not at this point launch a single major attack on Liang. The campaigns appeared to end in winter 552, and Emperor Wenxuan in fact promised the Liang generals Wang Sengbian and Chen Baxian, whom Emperor Yuan put in charge of the eastern half of Liang territory, to return the cities of Guangling (廣陵, in modern Yangzhou, Jiangsu) and Liyang (歷陽, in modern Chaohu, Anhui).

Also in winter 552, Emperor Wenxuan personally led troops from Jinyang to Lishi (離石, in modern Lüliang, Shanxi), and he ordered the construction of a great wall from Huanglu Mountain (黃櫨嶺, also in modern Lüliang) to Sheping Fortress (社平戍, in modern Xinzhou, Shanxi), apparently to defend against Western Wei and Tujue.

In winter 553, Khitan tribes were attacking Northern Qi's northern borders, and Emperor Wenxuan himself led troops to attack Khitan—and on this campaign, he was described as personally exposing himself to the dangers and contributing much personally to defeating the Khitan.

Also in winter 553, Emperor Wenxuan, wanting to put Northern Qi-friendly emperor on the Liang throne, commissioned an army commanded by Guo Yuanjian (郭元建) to escort Emperor Yuan's cousin Xiao Tui (蕭退), who had surrendered to Eastern Wei in 548, back to Liang territory. However, Northern Qi forces were defeated by the Liang general Hou Tian, and Xiao Tui returned to Yecheng.

Around the new year 554, the remnants of Rouran, which by that point was near its end, surrendered to Northern Qi to seek protection from Tujue attacks. Emperor Wenxuan personally attacked the Tujue, fighting its army off, and then created Yujiulü Anluochen as the new khan of Rouran, settling the Rouran people within Northern Qi territory, at Mayi (馬邑, in modern Shuozhou, Shanxi).

In spring 554, Emperor Wenxuan, assisted by the senior general Hulü Jin and his brother Gao Yan the Prince of Changshan, launched a major attack on the Shanhu (山胡) tribe (in modern Lüliang). After victory, he ordered that all 11-year-old and older males of the Shanhu be slaughtered, and that the females and the young males be awarded as spoils of war to the soldiers. When one of his commanders died because that commander's lieutenant, Lu Huili (路暉禮), was unable to save him, Emperor Wenxuan ordered that Lu's internal organs be cut out of his body and that the soldiers consume them. Many traditional historians, including Li Yanshou (李延壽), the author of the History of Northern Dynasties, and Sima Guang, the author of the Zizhi Tongjian, saw this battle as the turning point of Emperor Wenxuan's rule—that thereafter, he began to act violently and capriciously. For example, in spring 554, when Rouran rebelled and he personally led troops to defeat Yujiulü Anluochen, he felt that warhorses offered by the general Heba Ren (賀拔仁) the Prince of Anding were not of sufficient quality—and he punished Heba by plucking out Heba's hair and demoting to commoner status, and further ordering Heba to serve as a worker in a coal processing facility. In another example, in fall 554, after he had put the official Yuan Xu (元旭), a former Northern Wei prince, to death, he remembered the snubs that Gao Longzhi, who was a friend of Yuan Xu's, had shown him before he became Eastern Wei's regent, and he had Gao Longzhi battered so severely that Gao Longzhi died several days later—and at a later point, still angry at Gao Longzhi, arrested Gao Longzhi's 20 sons and, with 20 executioners lined up, had the sons beheaded simultaneously, and then threw their bodies and Gao Longzhi's body into the Zhang River.

Starting in 551, Emperor Wenxuan had ordered his official Wei Shou to compile a history of Northern Wei. Wei Shou completed the work in 554, but his work (Book of Wei) was criticized by many to be defamatory to ancestors of many political enemies (so much so that they referred to the work as Huishu (穢書—the Book of Filth)), and several officials filed reports condemning Wei Shou. Wei Shou submitted a petition to Emperor Wenxuan defending himself, and Emperor Wenxuan, in an act that he believed to be protecting the integrity of history, jailed the officials who condemned Wei Shou.

In late 554, Western Wei launched a major attack on Jiangling (江陵, in modern Jingzhou, Hubei), then the capital of Liang. Emperor Wenxuan commissioned an army commanded by Gao Huan's cousin Gao Yue (高岳) the Prince of Qinghe to attack Western Wei's An Province (安州, roughly modern Xiaogan, Hubei) to try to relieve pressure from Jiangling, but by the time that Gao Yue arrived, Jiangling had already fallen, and Western Wei captured and then executed Emperor Yuan.

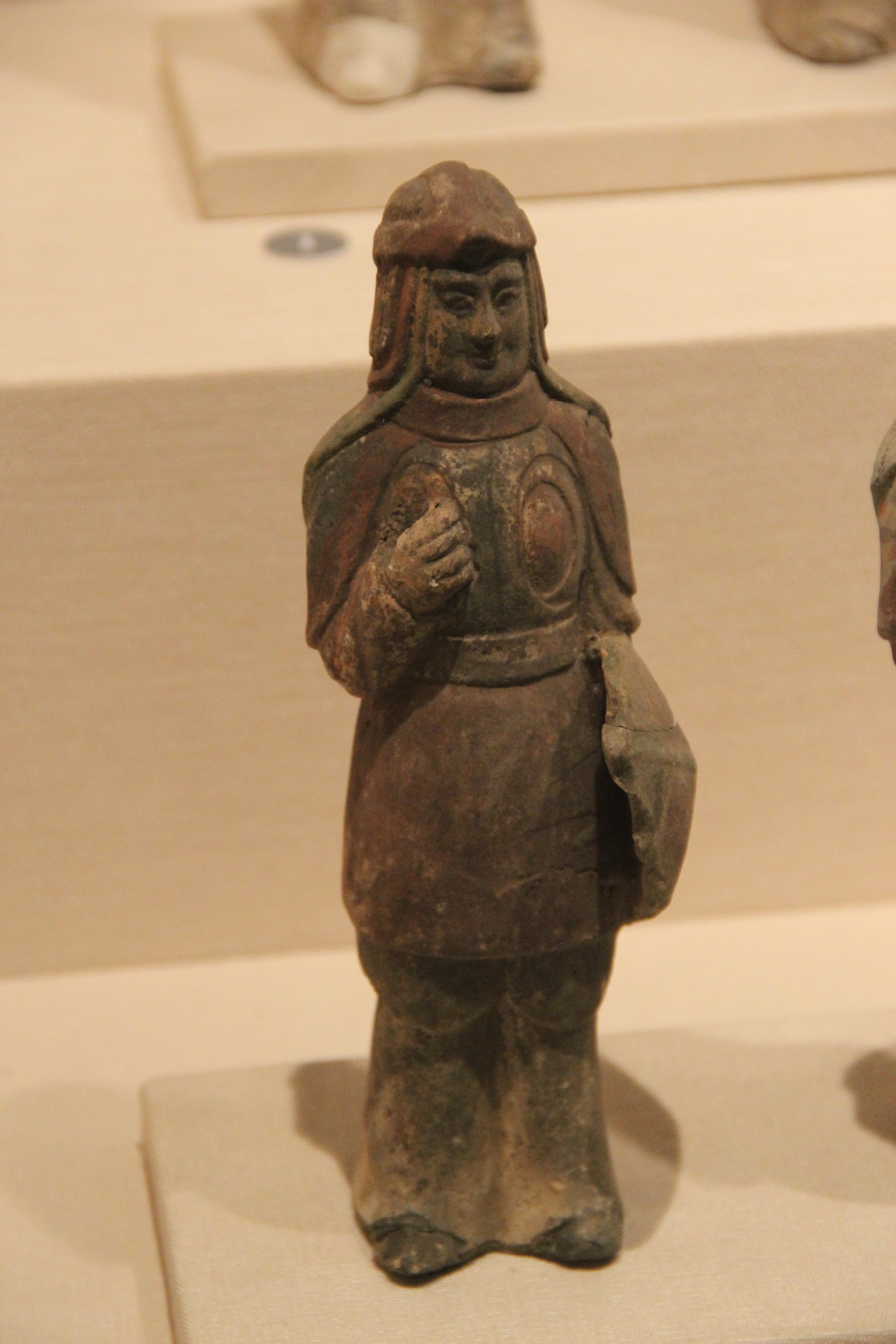
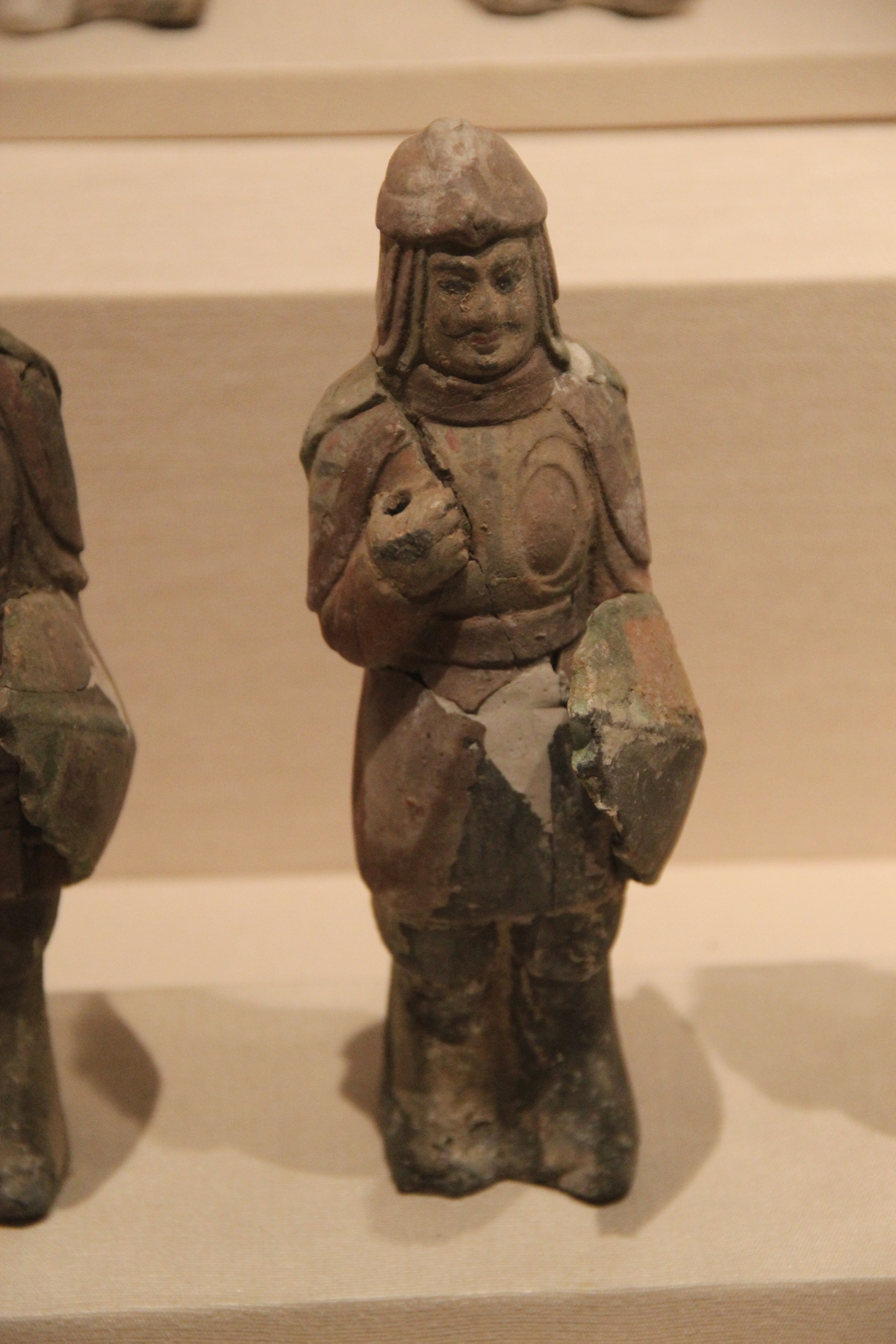
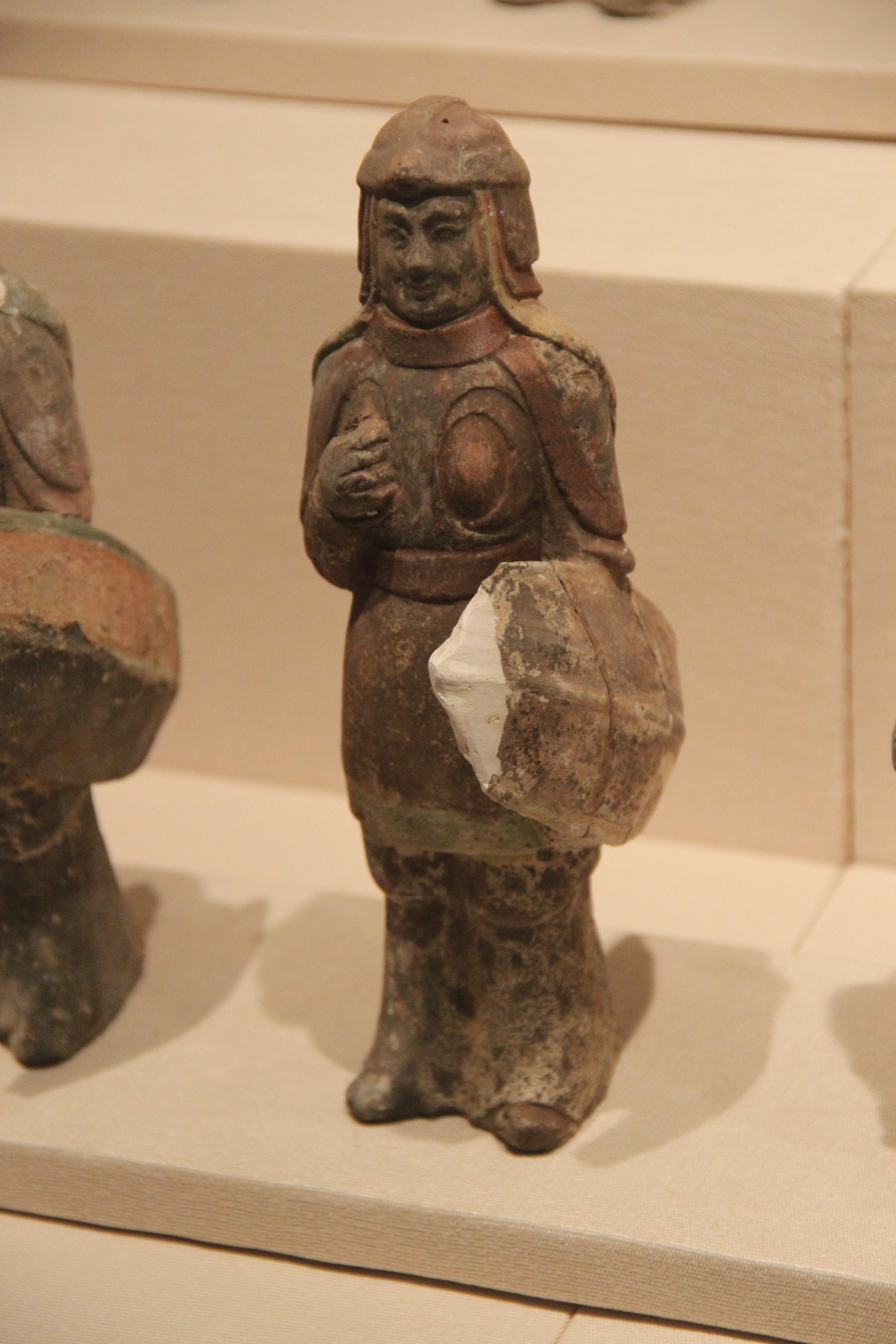
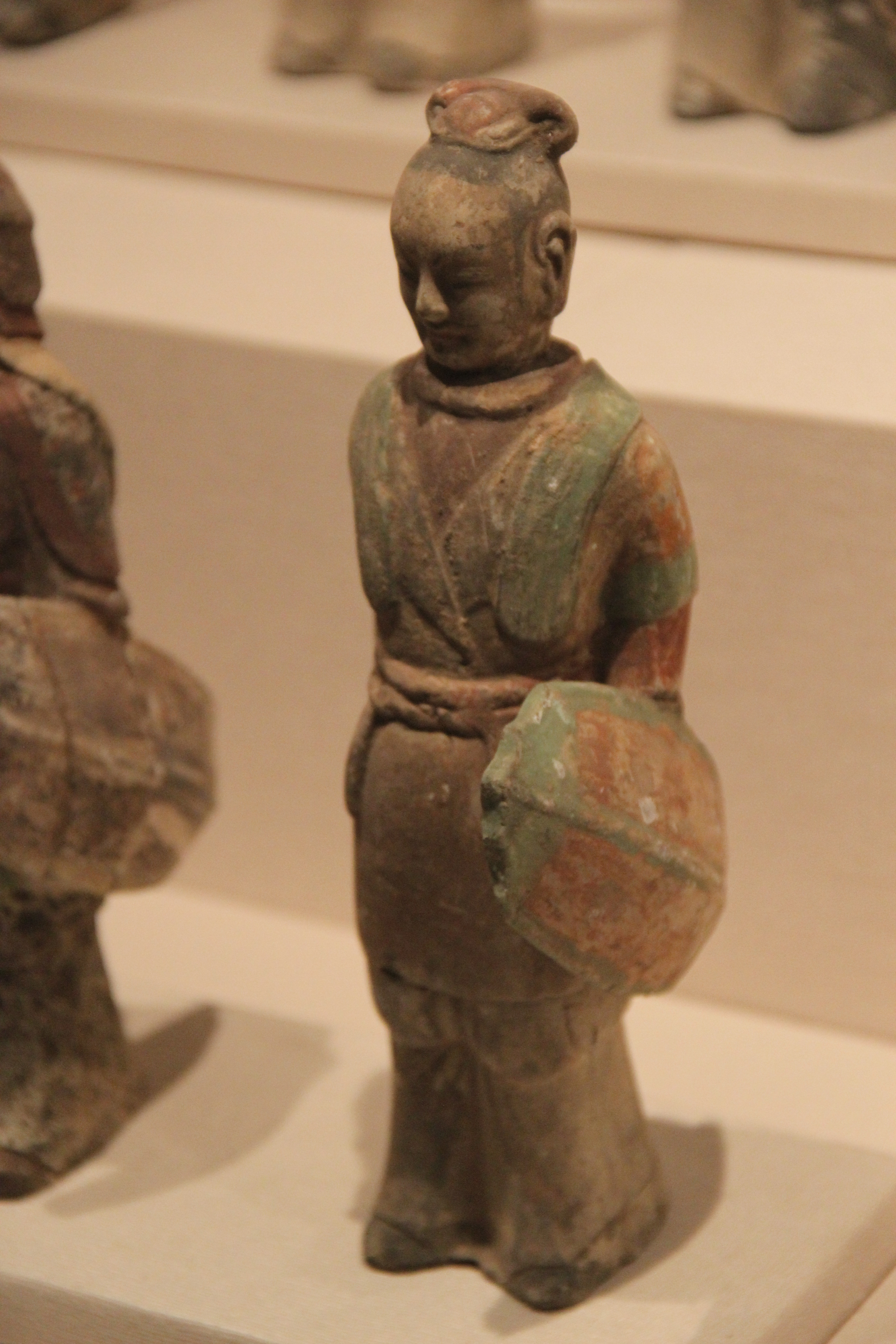
Funerary soldier figurines, Northern Qi

== Late reign ==
Western Wei declared Emperor Yuan's nephew Xiao Cha the Emperor of Liang (known in history as the Western Liang), but the declaration was not recognized by most Liang generals, and the chief of those generals, Wang Sengbian, welcomed Emperor Yuan's son Xiao Fangzhi the Prince of Jin'an to the old Liang capital Jiankang, declaring him the Prince of Liang in spring 555 and preparing to make him emperor. Emperor Wenxuan had other ideas, however, and he created Emperor Yuan's cousin Xiao Yuanming the Marquess of Zhenyang, whom Eastern Wei captured in 547 during Liang's attempt to aid Hou Jing's rebellion against Eastern Wei, emperor, commissioning his brother Gao Huàn (高渙, note tone difference with his father) the Prince of Shangdang to command an army to escort Xiao Yuanming back to Liang territory. Emperor Wenxuan wrote letters to Wang recommending Xiao Yuanming as emperor, arguing that Xiao Fangzhi (who was 12 years old) was too young. Wang initially rejected Xiao Yuanming, but after Gao Huan won a few battles over Wang's generals, Wang decided to submit and, after Northern Qi escorting troops agreed to limit their presence to 1,000 men, and Xiao Yuanming agreed to make Xiao Fangzhi crown prince, accepted Xiao Yuanming as emperor. To show his good faith, Wang sent his son Wang Xian (王顯) and nephew Wang Shizhen (王世珍), as well as Wang Xian's mother Lady Liu, to Yecheng as hostages. Xiao Yuanming became Liang's emperor, and there was peace between Northern Qi and Liang, with Liang now a vassal.

Just four months later, however, the situation changed. Wang Sengbian's lieutenant Chen Baxian, displeased over Xiao Yuanming's ascension (as he saw Xiao Yuanming's claim as being too attenuated), make a surprise attack on Jiankang from his headquarters of Jingkou (京口, in modern Zhenjiang, Jiangsu), killing Wang Sengbian and forcing Xiao Yuanming to yield the throne to Xiao Fangzhi (who took the throne as Emperor Jing). Initially, Chen claimed that Liang would still agree to be a vassal, and Emperor Wenxuan sent the official Sima Gong (司馬恭) to swear an oath with Liang officials. However, with several generals loyal to Wang Sengbian rising against Chen following Wang's death, Emperor Wenxuan's mind changed, particularly after two, Xu Sihui (徐嗣徽) and Ren Yue (任約) submitted to him, making a surprise attack on the near-Jiankang fortress Shitou and capturing it. Emperor Wenxuan sent the general Xiao Gui (蕭軌) to reinforce Xu and Ren. Chen defeated Northern Qi troops and Xu and Ren, however, and Xiao Gui's assistant Liu Damo (柳達摩), sieged by Chen in Shitou, sought peace. Chen agreed, and sent his nephew Chen Tanlang (陳曇朗), Emperor Jing's nephew Xiao Zhuang the Prince of Yongjia, and Wang Min (王珉), the son of the key official Wang Chong (王沖), to serve as hostages to Northern Qi, allowing Liu to withdraw. (Upon Liu's return to Northern Qi, however, Emperor Wenxuan had him executed.)

During the campaign against Liang, Emperor Wenxuan made another display of his increasing instability, as he, jealous over the fact that his concubine Consort Xue had previously had a sexual relationship with Gao Yue, ordered Gao Yue to commit suicide. Thereafter, he beheaded Consort Xue and hid her head in his sleeves. At a banquet later that day, he tossed her head onto a platter and cut her body into pieces, beginning to play with her leg, which he converted into a fiddle, surprising all of the banquet attendants. At the end of the banquet, he packed her body parts and began crying, following the cart carrying her body on foot.

In fall 555, Emperor Wenxuan became convinced that Buddhism and Taoism should be but one religion, and that one of them should be merged into the other. He had the leading Buddhist and Taoist monks debate before him, and he declared the Buddhists the victors, ordering Taoism merged into Buddhism and Taoist monks to become Buddhist monks. Some Taoist monks initially rejected this edict, but after he executed four monks, the others submitted, and Taoism became banned within Northern Qi.

In spring 556, border battles between Northern Qi and Liang resumed, and Northern Qi prepared another campaign against Liang. In summer 556, Northern Qi forces were again south of the Yangtze, operating in Jiankang's vicinity, but they were stalemated against Liang troops, eventually defeated by Chen and his generals after they ran out of food. A number of Northern Wei generals were captured and executed by Liang, and in response, Emperor Wenxuan put Chen Tanlang to death.

By this point, Emperor Wenxuan's erratic behavior became even greater in scope, fueled by his alcoholism. As described by Sima Guang in his Zizhi Tongjian:

... [Emperor Wenxuan] drank heavily and lived immorality, carrying out cruel and barbarous act at his on whim. Sometimes he sang and danced day and night. Sometimes he spread his hair and wore barbarian clothing with colorful sashes. Sometimes he bared his body and put on makeup. Sometimes he rode donkeys, cows, camels, or elephants without using saddles. Sometimes he ordered Cui Jishu or Liu Taozhi (劉桃枝) to carry him and a large drum to allow him to beat the drums. He was accustomed to making surprise charges into the nobles' and imperial officials' private residences. He often crossed streets, sometimes sitting in the streets and sometimes even sleeping on them. Sometimes when it is warm, he would be naked to bask in the sun, but even in the coldest winter, he would strip naked as well and run around. His attendants could not stand his behavior, but he himself did not care. ... Once, he asked a woman on the street, "How is the Son of Heaven like?" The woman responded, "He is so crazy that he really cannot be considered a Son of Heaven." He beheaded her.

Once, when he was drunk and acting irrationally, his mother Empress Dowager Lou rebuked him, and he threatened to marry her to an old barbarian. When she became angry, he became fearful, and he wanted to induce her to smile again, so he crawled on the ground under her seat, but in doing so, he flipped the seat over, and she was injured. After he sobered up, he realized how she had been injured, and he set a large fire, intending to jump in to die, causing her to have to grab him to save him. He thereafter pledged not to drink any more, but was only able to do so for 10 days before he began drinking again. He also once shot an arrow at Empress Li's mother Lady Cui and whipped her. Further, it was described that most women of the imperial Gao clan were forced to have sexual relations with him at one point or another. When Gao Huan's concubine Erzhu Ying'e, the Princess Dowager of Pengcheng, refused, he killed her with his own hands. Emperor Wenxuan also became homicidal when he drank, and he always wanted to kill people when he was drunk, mostly by dismemberment, but sometimes by burning or drowning. Yang Yin, who was prime minister at this point, therefore set up a group of condemned prisoners and a saw to be available to the palace guards—if Emperor Wenxuan wanted to kill someone, a condemned prisoner would be brought out for him to kill, and if a prisoner was able to survive for three months without being killed, he would be set free.

However, even in his erratic behavior, Emperor Wenxuan was still attentive to many important matters, and because of his harshness, his officials did not dare to be corrupt. Further, Yang was a capable prime minister, and Emperor Wenxuan gave him full authorization to carry out laws properly. Therefore, it was said at the time that while the emperor was violent and insane, the government was nevertheless efficient.

In winter 557, believing prophecies that Gao Huàn would be emperor, he ordered Gao Huàn arrested. Gao Huàn tried to resist, but was nevertheless captured and delivered to Yecheng. When another brother, Gao Jun (高浚) the prince of Yong'an, sent petitions urging him to change his behavior, he had Gao Jun arrested as well, and the two princes were imprisoned in a dungeon.

Also in winter 557, Chen Baxian had Liang's Emperor Jing yield the throne to him, establishing the Chen dynasty, and subsequently had Emperor Jing killed in 558. The general Wang Lin, then in control of modern Hunan and eastern Hubei, refused to submit to Chen and sought to continue Liang's lineage. He therefore requested Northern Qi to return Xiao Zhuang the Prince of Yongjia to be emperor. In spring 558, Northern Qi troops escorted Xiao Zhuang to Wang's territory, and Wang declared Xiao Zhuang emperor, as a Northern Qi vassal, with his capital at Jiangxia (江夏, in modern Wuhan, Hubei).

By this point, Emperor Wenxuan's military campaigns and other wasteful behavior had caused the imperial treasury to be drained. He had also become unhappy with his son Gao Yin, believing that Gao Yin was too Han-like in behavior, and he considered deposing Gao Yin. Once, he ordered Gao Yin to personally execute a prisoner, but Gao Yin could not bring himself to do so, and Emperor Wenxuan battered him with a whip handle, causing Gao Yin to thereafter have a panic disorder and at times be unable to speak. When Emperor Wenxuan became drunk, he would often state that he might eventually pass the throne to his brother Gao Yan, and he stopped stating as such only after urging by Yang and Wei Shou, who believed that his words were causing an unstabling effect in causing a doubt as to who would succeed him.

Around the new year 559, Emperor Wenxuan visited the imprisoned Gao Jun and Gao Huàn. He initially took pity on them and considered releasing them, but, at the urging of another brother, Gao Zhan the Prince of Changguang, did not do so, and further started to pierce them with spears. He also ordered that torches be thrown at them, burning them to death. He rewarded the princes' wives to the soldiers who delivered the death blows.

In summer 559, Emperor Wenxuan, suspecting that the members of the Northern Wei imperial Yuan clan would eventually try to return to power, ordered the Yuans to be slaughtered, regardless of age or gender, and had the bodies thrown into the Zhang River. In particular, a man named Yuan Huangtou was flown off a tower strapped to a kite as part of an experiment of Emperor Wenxuan, in the first known case of human flight. He survived but was starved to death in prison. Only several households who were particularly close to the Gaos were spared.

In fall 559, Emperor Wenxuan suffered a major illness that historians believed to be alcoholism-driven. He stated to Empress Li, "A person will live and die, and there is nothing to regret, other than that our son Gao Yin is still young, and someone else will take his throne." He stated to Gao Yan, "Go ahead and take the throne, but do not kill him!" However, he did not change the succession order, and after his death, Gao Yin took the throne as Emperor Fei. The officials tried to mourn at his death, but no one was actually able to shed a tear other than Yang Yin. Not long after, Gao Yan killed Yang Yin and deposed Gao Yin, becoming emperor.

== Physical appearance ==
In the Book of Northern Qi, author Li Baiyao notes that Gao Yang was a dark-skinned man with large and protruding jaws, and that his skin appeared to be abnormally rough.

== Family ==
Consorts and Issue:

- Empress Zhaoxin, of the Li clan of Zhao (昭信皇后 趙郡李氏), personal name Zu'e (祖娥)
  - Gao Yin, Prince Jinan Mindao (濟南愍悼王 高殷; 545–561), first son
  - Gao Shaode, Prince Taiyuan (太原王 高紹德; 548–562), second son
  - Princess Changle (長樂公主), personal name Baode (寶德)
    - Married Wei Shibian (尉世辯)
  - Princess Yining (義寧公主)
    - Married Hulü Wudu (斛律武都; d. 572), the first son of Hulü Guang
- Furen, of the Yan clan (弘德夫人 顏氏; 530–576), personal name Yuguang (玉光)
  - Gao Shaolian, Prince Longxi (隴西王 高紹廉; 553–577), fifth son
- Pin, of the Pei clan (嬪 裴氏)
  - Gao Shaoren, Prince Xihe (西河王 高紹仁; d. 577), fourth son
- Pin, of the Xue clan (嬪 薛氏; d. 555)
  - A daughter
- Shifu, of the Feng clan (世婦 馮氏)
  - Gao Shaoyi, Prince Fanyang (范陽王 高紹義; d. 580), third son
- Unknown
  - Princess Zhongshan (中山公主)
    - Married Duan Baoding of Wuwei (武威 段寶鼎)

== Notes ==
Chinese royalty
| New dynasty | Emperor of Northern Qi; 550–559 | Succeeded by Emperor Fei of Northern Qi |
| Preceded by Emperor Xiaojing of Eastern Wei | Emperor of China (Northern/Central); 550–559 | Succeeded by Emperor Fei of Northern Qi |
