= List of Chinese era names =

This is a list of the Chinese era names used by the various dynasties and regimes in the history of China, sorted by monarch.

The English renditions of the era names in this list are based on the Hanyu Pinyin system. However, some academic works utilize the Wade–Giles romanization. For instance, the era of Zhenguan (貞觀) during the reign of the Emperor Taizong of Tang is rendered as Chen-kuan in Wade–Giles.

== Han dynasty ==
=== Western Han ===
Era name	Period of use	Length of use	Remark
Emperor Wu of Han (r. 141–87 BCE)
Jianyuan 建元	140–135 BCE	6 years	
Yuanguang 元光	134–129 BCE	6 years	
Yuanshuo 元朔	128–123 BCE	6 years	
Yuanshou 元狩	122–117 BCE	6 years	
Yuanding 元鼎	116–111 BCE	6 years	
Yuanfeng 元封	110–105 BCE	6 years	
Taichu 太初	104–101 BCE	4 years	
Tianhan 天漢	100–97 BCE	4 years	
Taishi 太始	96–93 BCE	4 years	
Zhenghe 征和	92–89 BCE	4 years	Or Yanhe (延和).
Houyuan 後元	88–87 BCE	2 years	Or Hou (後), Zhenghehouyuan (征和後元). Might not be an era name.
Emperor Zhao of Han (r. 87–74 BCE)
Shiyuan 始元	86–80 BCE	7 years	
Yuanfeng 元鳳	80–75 BCE	6 years	
Yuanping 元平	74 BCE	1 year	Usage continued by Liu He and the Emperor Xuan of Han upon their ascension to the throne.
Emperor Xuan of Han (r. 74–48 BCE)
Benshi 本始	73–70 BCE	4 years	
Dijie 地節	69–66 BCE	4 years	
Yuankang 元康	65–61 BCE	4 years 2 months	
Shenjue 神爵	61–58 BCE	4 years	
Wufeng 五鳳	57–54 BCE	4 years	
Ganlu 甘露	53–50 BCE	4 years	
Huanglong 黃龍	49 BCE	1 year	
Emperor Yuan of Han (r. 48–33 BCE)
Chuyuan 初元	48–44 BCE	5 years	
Yongguang 永光	43–39 BCE	5 years	
Jianzhao 建昭	38–34 BCE	5 years	
Jingning 竟寧	33 BCE	1 year	Usage continued by the Emperor Cheng of Han upon his ascension to the throne.
Emperor Cheng of Han (r. 33–7 BCE)
Jianshi 建始	32–28 BCE	4 years 2 months	
Heping 河平	28–25 BCE	4 years	Referenced the pacification of the Yellow River after its major 29 BCE flood
Yangshuo 陽朔	24–21 BCE	4 years	
Hongjia 鴻嘉	20–17 BCE	4 years	
Yongshi 永始	16–13 BCE	4 years	
Yuanyan 元延	12–9 BCE	4 years	
Suihe 綏和	8–7 BCE	2 years	Usage continued by the Emperor Ai of Han upon his ascension to the throne.
Emperor Ai of Han (r. 7–1 BCE)
Jianping 建平	6–3 BCE	4 years	
Taichuyuanjiang 太初元將	5 BCE	3 months	Or Taichu (太初). Subsequently, reverted to Jianping (建平).
Yuanshou 元壽	2–1 BCE	2 years	Or Yuanshou (元受). Usage continued by the Emperor Ping of Han upon his ascension to the throne.
Emperor Ping of Han (r. 1 BCE–6 CE)
Yuanshi 元始	1–5 CE	5 years	1st year of Yuanshi is 1 CE
Liu Ying (r. 6–9 CE)
Jushe 居攝	6–8 CE	3 years	
Chushi 初始	8 CE	1 month	Or Shichu (始初).

=== Xin dynasty ===
Era name	Period of use	Length of use	Remark
Wang Mang (r. 9–23 CE)
Shijianguo 始建國	9–13 CE	5 years	Or Jianguo (建國).
Tianfeng 天鳳	14–19 CE	6 years	Or Shijianguotianfengshangwu (始建國天鳳上戊), Shijianguotianfeng (始建國天鳳).
Dihuang 地皇	20–23 CE	4 years	Or Shijianguodihuangshangwu (始建國地皇上戊), Shijianguodihuang (始建國地皇).

=== Xuan Han ===
Era name	Period of use	Length of use	Remark
Gengshi Emperor (r. 23–25 CE)
Gengshi 更始	23–25 CE	3 years	

=== Eastern Han ===
Era name	Period of use	Length of use	Remark
Emperor Guangwu of Han (r. 25–57 CE)
Jianwu 建武	25–56 CE	32 years	
Jianwuzhongyuan 建武中元	56–57 CE	2 years	Or Zhongyuan (中元). Usage continued by the Emperor Ming of Han upon his ascension to the throne.
Emperor Ming of Han (r. 57–75 CE)
Yongping 永平	58–75 CE	18 years	Usage continued by the Emperor Zhang of Han upon his ascension to the throne.
Emperor Zhang of Han (r. 75–88 CE)
Jianchu 建初	76–84 CE	9 years	
Yuanhe 元和	84–87 CE	4 years	
Zhanghe 章和	84–87 CE	4 years	Usage continued by the Emperor He of Han upon his ascension to the throne.
Emperor He of Han (r. 88–105 CE)
Yongyuan 永元	89–105 CE	17 years	
Yuanxing 元興	105 CE	9 months	
Emperor Shang of Han (r. 106 CE)
Yanping 延平	106 CE	1 year	Usage continued by the Emperor An of Han upon his ascension to the throne.
Emperor An of Han (r. 106–125 CE)
Yongchu 永初	107–113 CE	7 years	
Yuanchu 元初	114–120 CE	7 years	
Yongning 永寧	120–121 CE	2 years	
Jianguang 建光	121–122 CE	2 years	
Yanguang 延光	122–125 CE	4 years	Usage continued by Liu Yi and the Emperor Shun of Han upon their ascension to the throne.
Emperor Shun of Han (r. 125–144 CE)
Yongjian 永建	126–132 CE	7 years	
Yangjia 陽嘉	132–135 CE	4 years	
Yonghe 永和	136–141 CE	6 years	
Han'an 漢安	142–144 CE	3 years	
Jiankang 建康	144 CE	9 months	Usage continued by the Emperor Chong of Han upon his ascension to the throne.
Emperor Chong of Han (r. 144–145 CE)
Yongxi 永憙	145 CE	1 year	Or Yuanjia (元嘉), Yongjia (永嘉), Yongxi (永熹). Usage continued by the Emperor Zhi of Han upon his ascension to the throne.
Emperor Zhi of Han (r. 145–146 CE)
Benchu 本初	146 CE	1 year	Usage continued by the Emperor Huan of Han upon his ascension to the throne.
Emperor Huan of Han (r. 146–168 CE)
Jianhe 建和	147–149 CE	3 years	
Heping 和平	150 CE	1 year	
Yuanjia 元嘉	151–153 CE	3 years	
Yongxing 永興	153–154 CE	2 years	
Yongshou 永壽	155–158 CE	4 years	
Yanxi 延熹	158–167 CE	10 years	
Yongkang 永康	167 CE	6 months	
Emperor Ling of Han (r. 168–189 CE)
Jianning 建寧	168–172 CE	5 years	
Xiping 熹平	172–178 CE	7 years	
Guanghe 光和	178–184 CE	7 years	
Zhongping 中平	184–189 CE	6 years	
Liu Bian (r. 189 CE)
Guangxi 光熹	189 CE	5 months	
Zhaoning 昭寧	189 CE	2 months	
Emperor Xian of Han (r. 189–220 CE)
Yonghan 永漢	189 CE	4 months	
Zhongping 中平	189 CE	1 month	
Chuping 初平	190–193 CE	4 years	
Xingping 興平	194–195 CE	2 years	
Jian'an 建安	196–220 CE	25 years	
Yankang 延康	220 CE	7 months	

=== Other regimes contemporaneous with Han dynasty ===
Era name	Period of use	Length of use	Remark
Kui Xiao (r. 23–34 CE)
Hanfu 漢复	23–34 CE	12 years	
Gongsun Shu (r. 25–36 CE)
Longxing 龍興	25–36 CE	12 years	
Liu Penzi (r. 25–27 CE)
Jianshi 建世	25–27 CE	3 years	Or Jianshi (建始).
Yuan Shu (r. 197–199 CE)
Zhongjia 仲家	197-199 CE	3 years	
Zhang Mancheng
Shenshang 神上	Unknown	Unknown	

== Three Kingdoms ==
=== Cao Wei ===
Era name	Period of use	Length of use	Remark
Emperor Wen of Cao Wei (r. 220–226 CE)
Huangchu 黃初	220–226 CE	7 years	Usage continued by the Emperor Ming of Cao Wei upon his ascension to the throne.
Emperor Ming of Cao Wei (r. 226–239 CE)
Taihe 太和	227–233 CE	7 years	
Qinglong 青龍	233–237 CE	5 years	
Jingchu 景初	237–239 CE	3 years	Usage continued by Cao Fang upon his ascension to the throne.
Cao Fang (r. 239–254 CE)
Zhengshi 正始	240–249 CE	10 years	
Jiaping 嘉平	249–254 CE	6 years	
Cao Mao (r. 254–260 CE)
Zhengyuan 正元	254–256 CE	3 years	
Ganlu 甘露	256–260 CE	5 years	
Emperor Yuan of Cao Wei (r. 260–266 CE)
Jingyuan 景元	260–264 CE	5 years	
Xianxi 咸熙	264–265 CE	2 years	

=== Shu Han ===
Era name	Period of use	Length of use	Remark
Emperor Zhaolie of Shu Han (r. 221–223 CE)
Zhangwu 章武	221–223 CE	3 years	
Emperor Xiaohuai of Shu Han (r. 223–263 CE)
Jianxing 建興	223–237 CE	15 years	
Yanxi 延熙	238–257 CE	20 years	
Jingyao 景耀	258–263 CE	6 years	
Yanxing 炎興	263 CE	5 months	

=== Eastern Wu ===
Era name	Period of use	Length of use	Remark
Emperor Da of Eastern Wu (r. 222–252 CE)
Huangwu 黃武	222–229 CE	8 years	
Huanglong 黃龍	229–231 CE	3 years	
Jiahe 嘉禾	232–238 CE	7 years	
Chiwu 赤烏	238–251 CE	14 years	
Taiyuan 太元	251–252 CE	2 years	
Shenfeng 神鳳	252 CE	3 months	
Sun Liang (r. 252–258 CE)
Jianxing 建興	252–253 CE	2 years	
Wufeng 五鳳	254–256 CE	3 years	
Taiping 太平	256–258 CE	3 years	
Emperor Jing of Eastern Wu (r. 258–264 CE)
Yong'an 永安	258–264 CE	7 years	
Sun Hao (r. 264–280 CE)
Yuanxing 元興	264–265 CE	2 years	
Ganlu 甘露	265–266 CE	2 years	
Baoding 寶鼎	266–269 CE	4 years	
Jianheng 建衡	269–271 CE	3 years	
Fenghuang 鳳凰	272–274 CE	3 years	
Tiance 天冊	275–276 CE	2 years	
Tianxi 天璽	276 CE	6 months	
Tianji 天紀	277–280 CE	4 years	

=== Other regimes contemporaneous with Three Kingdoms ===
Era name	Period of use	Length of use	Remark
Gongsun Yuan (r. 237–238 CE)
Shaohan 紹漢	237–238 CE	1 year 1 month	

== Jin dynasty ==
=== Western Jin ===
Era name	Period of use	Length of use	Remark
Emperor Wu of Jin (r. 266–290 CE)
Taishi 泰始	265–274 CE	10 years	
Xianning 咸寧	275–280 CE	6 years	
Taikang 太康	280–289 CE	10 years	
Taixi 太熙	290 CE	4 months	
Emperor Hui of Jin (r. 290–306 CE)
Yongxi 永熙	290 CE	9 months	
Yongping 永平	291 CE	3 months	
Yuankang 元康	291–299 CE	9 years	
Yongkang 永康	300–301 CE	2 years	
Yongning 永寧	301–302 CE	2 years	
Tai'an 太安	302–303 CE	2 years	Or Da'an (大安).
Yong'an 永安	304 CE	8 months	
Jianwu 建武	304 CE	5 months	Subsequently, reverted to Yong'an (永安).
Yongxing 永興	304–306 CE	3 years	
Guangxi 光熙	306 CE	7 months	Usage continued by the Emperor Huai of Jin upon his ascension to the throne.
Emperor Huai of Jin (r. 306–313 CE)
Yongjia 永嘉	307–313 CE	7 years	
Emperor Min of Jin (r. 313–316 CE)
Jianxing 建興	313–317 CE	5 years	Also used by the Former Liang.

=== Eastern Jin ===
Era name	Period of use	Length of use	Remark
Emperor Yuan of Jin (r. 317–323 CE)
Jianwu 建武	317–318 CE	2 years	
Daxing 大興	318–321 CE	4 years	Or Taixing (太興).
Yongchang 永昌	322–323 CE	2 years	Usage continued by the Emperor Ming of Jin upon his ascension to the throne.
Emperor Ming of Jin (r. 323–325 CE)
Taining 太寧	323–326 CE	4 years	Usage continued by the Emperor Cheng of Jin upon his ascension to the throne.
Emperor Cheng of Jin (r. 325–342 CE)
Xianhe 咸和	326–334 CE	9 years	
Xiankang 咸康	335–342 CE	8 years	Usage continued by the Emperor Kang of Jin upon his ascension to the throne.
Emperor Kang of Jin (r. 342–344 CE)
Jianyuan 建元	343–344 CE	2 years	Usage continued by the Emperor Mu of Jin upon his ascension to the throne.
Emperor Mu of Jin (r. 344–361 CE)
Yonghe 永和	345–356 CE	12 years	
Shengping 升平	357–361 CE	5 years	Usage continued by the Emperor Ai of Jin upon his ascension to the throne. Also used by the Former Liang.
Emperor Ai of Jin (r. 361–365 CE)
Longhe 隆和	362–363 CE	2 years	Or Chonghe (崇和).
Xingning 興寧	363–365 CE	3 years	Usage continued by Sima Yi upon his ascension to the throne.
Sima Yi (r. 365–371 CE)
Taihe 太和	366–371 CE	6 years	
Emperor Jianwen of Jin (r. 371–372 CE)
Xian'an 咸安	371–372 CE	2 years	Usage continued by the Emperor Xiaowu of Jin upon his ascension to the throne.
Emperor Xiaowu of Jin (r. 372–396 CE)
Ningkang 寧康	373–375 CE	3 years	Sometimes erroneously referred to as Kangning (康寧).
Taiyuan 太元	376–396 CE	21 years	Usage continued by the Emperor An of Jin upon his ascension to the throne.
Emperor An of Jin (r. 396–419 CE)
Long'an 隆安	397–401 CE	5 years	Or Chong'an (崇安).
Yuanxing 元興	402–404 CE	3 years	
Daheng 大亨	402 CE	9 months	Subsequently, reverted to Long'an (隆安).
Yixi 義熙	405–419 CE	15 years	Usage continued by the Emperor Gong of Jin upon his ascension to the throne.
Emperor Gong of Jin (r. 419–420 CE)
Yuanxi 元熙	419–420 CE	2 years	

=== Huan Chu ===
Era name	Period of use	Length of use	Remark
Emperor Wudao of Huan Chu (r. 403–404 CE)
Yongshi 永始	403–404 CE	2 years	
Huan Qian (r. 404–405 CE)
Tiankang 天康	404–405 CE	2 years	

=== Other regimes contemporaneous with Jin dynasty ===
Era name	Period of use	Length of use	Remark
Zhao Xin (r. 300–301 CE)
Taiping 太平	300–301 CE	2 months	
Sima Lun (r. 301 CE)
Jianshi 建始	301 CE	4 months	
Qiu Shen (r. 303 CE)
Shenfeng 神鳳	303 CE	4 months	
Sima Bao (r. 319–320 CE)
Jiankang 建康	319–320 CE	2 years	
Li Hong (r. 370 CE)
Fenghuang 鳳凰	370 CE	1 year	

== Sixteen Kingdoms ==
=== Han-Zhao ===
Era name	Period of use	Length of use	Remark
Emperor Guangwen of Han-Zhao (r. 304–310 CE)
Yuanxi 元熙	304–308 CE	5 years	
Yongfeng 永鳳	308–309 CE	2 years	
Herui 河瑞	309–310 CE	2 years	Usage continued by Liu He upon his ascension to the throne.
Emperor Zhaowu of Han-Zhao (r. 310–318 CE)
Guangxing 光興	310–311 CE	2 years	
Jiaping 嘉平	311–315 CE	5 years	
Jianyuan 建元	315–316 CE	2 years	
Linjia 麟嘉	316–318 CE	3 years	
Emperor Yin of Han-Zhao (r. 318 CE)
Hanchang 漢昌	318 CE	3 months	
Liu Yao (r. 318–329 CE)
Guangchu 光初	318–329 CE	12 years	Or Zuochu (佐初).

=== Cheng-Han ===
Era name	Period of use	Length of use	Remark
Emperor Jing of Cheng-Han (r. 303 CE)
Jianchu 建初	303–304 CE	2 years	Usage continued by Li Liu upon his ascension to the throne.
Emperor Wu of Cheng-Han (r. 304–334 CE)
Jianxing 建興	304–306 CE	3 years	
Yanping 晏平	306–310 CE	5 years	Or Xuanping (宣平).
Yuheng 玉衡	311–334 CE	24 years	Usage continued by the Emperor Ai of Cheng-Han and Li Qi upon their ascension to the throne.
Dawu 大武	Unknown	Unknown	
Li Qi (r. 334–338 CE)
Yuheng 玉恒	335–338 CE	4 years	
Emperor Zhaowen of Cheng-Han (r. 338–343 CE)
Hanxing 漢興	338–343 CE	6 years	Usage continued by Li Shi upon his ascension to the throne.
Li Shi (r. 343–347 CE)
Taihe 太和	344–346 CE	3 years	
Jianing 嘉寧	346–347 CE	2 years	

=== Later Zhao ===
Era name	Period of use	Length of use	Remark
Emperor Ming of Later Zhao (r. 319–333 CE)
Taihe 太和	328–330 CE	3 years	
Jianping 建平	330–333 CE	4 years	Usage continued by Shi Hong upon his ascension to the throne.
Shi Hong (r. 333–334 CE)
Yanxi 延熙	334 CE	1 year	Usage continued by the Emperor Wu of Later Zhao upon his ascension to the throne.
Emperor Wu of Later Zhao (r. 334–349 CE)
Jianwu 建武	335–348 CE	14 years	
Taining 太寧	349 CE	1 year	Or Taining (泰宁). Usage continued by Shi Shi, Shi Zun, and Shi Jian upon their ascension to the throne.
Yongxi 永熙	Unknown	Unknown	
Yanxing 延興	Unknown	Unknown	
Shi Jian (r. 349–350 CE)
Qinglong 青龍	350 CE	3 months	
Shi Zhi (r. 350–351 CE)
Yongning 永寧	350–351 CE	1 year 1 month	

=== Former Liang ===
Era name	Period of use	Length of use	Remark
Prince Ming of Former Liang (r. 314–320 CE)
Jianxing 建興	317–320 CE	4 years	Adopted the era name of the Emperor Min of Jin. Or Yong'an (永安).
Prince Cheng of Former Liang (r. 320–324 CE)
Jianxing 建興	320–324 CE	5 years	Adopted the era name of the Emperor Min of Jin. Or Yongyuan (永元).
Prince Wen of Former Liang (r. 324–346 CE)
Jianxing 建興	324–346 CE	23 years	Adopted the era name of the Emperor Min of Jin. Or Taiyuan (太元).
Prince Huan of Former Liang (r. 346–353 CE)
Jianxing 建興	346–353 CE	8 years	Adopted the era name of the Emperor Min of Jin. Or Yongle (永樂).
Prince Wei of Former Liang (r. 353–355 CE)
Heping 和平	354–355 CE	2 years	
Prince Chong of Former Liang (r. 355–363 CE)
Jianxing 建興	355–361 CE	6 years	Adopted the era name of the Emperor Min of Jin.
Shengping 升平	361–363 CE	3 years	Adopted the era name of the Emperor Mu of Jin. Or Taishi (太始).
Zhang Tianxi (r. 363–376 CE)
Shengping 升平	363–376 CE	14 years	Adopted the era name of the Emperor Mu of Jin. Or Taiqing (太清).

=== Former Yan ===
Era name	Period of use	Length of use	Remark
Emperor Wenming of Former Yan (r. 337–348 CE)
Yanyuan 燕元	Unknown	Unknown	
Emperor Jingzhao of Former Yan (r. 348–360 CE)
Yuanxi 元璽	352–357 CE	6 years	
Guangshou 光壽	357–359 CE	3 years	
Emperor You of Former Yan (r. 360–370 CE)
Jianxi 建熙	360–370 CE	11 years	

=== Former Qin ===
Era name	Period of use	Length of use	Remark
Emperor Jingming of Former Qin (r. 351–355 CE)
Huangshi 皇始	351–355 CE	5 years	
Fu Sheng (r. 355–357 CE)
Shouguang 壽光	355–357 CE	3 years	
Emperor Xuanzhao of Former Qin (r. 357–385 CE)
Yongxing 永興	357–359 CE	3 years	
Ganlu 甘露	359–364 CE	6 years	
Jianyuan 建元	365–385 CE	21 years	
Emperor Aiping of Former Qin (r. 385–386 CE)
Tai'an 太安	385–386 CE	2 years	
Emperor Gao of Former Qin (r. 386–394 CE)
Taichu 太初	386–394 CE	9 years	
Fu Chong (r. 394 CE)
Yanchu 延初	394 CE	4 months	

=== Later Yan ===
Era name	Period of use	Length of use	Remark
Emperor Chengwu of Later Yan (r. 384–396 CE)
Yanyuan 燕元	384–386 CE	3 years	
Jianxing 建興	386–396 CE	11 years	
Emperor Huimin of Later Yan (r. 396–398 CE)
Yongkang 永康	396–398 CE	3 years	
Emperor Zhaowu of Later Yan (r. 398–401 CE)
Jianping 建平	398 CE	3 months	
Changle 長樂	399–401 CE	3 years	
Emperor Zhaowen of Later Yan (r. 401–407 CE)
Guangshi 光始	401–406 CE	6 years	
Jianshi 建始	407 CE	7 months	

=== Later Qin ===
Era name	Period of use	Length of use	Remark
Emperor Wuzhao of Later Qin (r. 384–394 CE)
Baique 白雀	384–386 CE	3 years	
Jianchu 建初	386–394 CE	9 years	
Emperor Wenhuan of Later Qin (r. 394–416 CE)
Huangchu 皇初	394–399 CE	6 years	
Hongshi 弘始	399–416 CE	18 years	
Yao Hong (r. 416–417 CE)
Yonghe 永和	416–417 CE	2 years	

=== Western Qin ===
Era name	Period of use	Length of use	Remark
Prince Xuanlie of Western Qin (r. 385–388 CE)
Jianyi 建義	385–388 CE	4 years	
Prince Wuyuan of Western Qin (r. 388–400 CE; first reign)
Taichu 太初	388–400 CE	13 years	
Prince Wuyuan of Western Qin (r. 409–412 CE; second reign)
Gengshi 更始	409–412 CE	4 years	
Prince Wenzhao of Western Qin (r. 412–428 CE)
Yongkang 永康	412–419 CE	8 years	
Jianhong 建弘	420–428 CE	9 years	
Qifu Mumo (r. 428–431 CE)
Yonghong 永弘	428–431 CE	4 years	

=== Later Liang ===
Era name	Period of use	Length of use	Remark
Emperor Yiwu of Later Liang (r. 386–399 CE)
Tai'an 太安	386–389 CE	4 years	Or Da'an (大安).
Linjia 麟嘉	389–396 CE	8 years	
Longfei 龍飛	396–399 CE	4 years	Usage continued by Lü Shao upon his ascension to the throne.
Chengkang 承康	Unknown	Unknown	
Emperor Ling of Later Liang (r. 399–401 CE)
Xianning 咸寧	399–401 CE	3 years	
Lü Long (r. 401–403 CE)
Shending 神鼎	401–403 CE	3 years	

=== Southern Liang ===
Era name	Period of use	Length of use	Remark
Prince Wu of Wuwei (r. 397–399 CE)
Taichu 太初	397–399 CE	3 years	
Prince Kang of Hexi (r. 399–402 CE)
Jianhe 建和	400–402 CE	3 years	
Prince Jing of Southern Liang (r. 402–414 CE)
Hongchang 弘昌	402–404 CE	3 years	Or Hongchang (宏昌).
Jiaping 嘉平	408–414 CE	7 years	

=== Northern Liang ===
Era name	Period of use	Length of use	Remark
Duan Ye (r. 397–401 CE)
Shenxi 神璽	397–399 CE	3 years	
Tianxi 天璽	399–401 CE	3 years	Or Liuxi (六璽).
Prince Wuxuan of Northern Liang (r. 401–433 CE)
Yong'an 永安	401–412 CE	12 years	
Xuanshi 玄始	412–428 CE	17 years	Or Yuanshi (元始).
Zhenxing 真興	Unknown	Unknown	
Chengxuan 承玄	428–431 CE	4 years	
Yihe 義和	431–433 CE	3 years	
Chengyang 承陽	Unknown	Unknown	
Yuanhe 緣禾	Unknown	Unknown	
Prince Ai of Northern Liang (r. 433–439 CE)
Chenghe 承和	433–439 CE	7 years	Or Yonghe (永和).
Taiyuan 太緣	Unknown	Unknown	
Jianping 建平	Unknown	Unknown	
Juqu Wuhui (r. 442–444 CE)
Chengping 承平	443–460 CE	18 years	Usage continued by Juqu Anzhou upon his ascension to the throne.

=== Southern Yan ===
Era name	Period of use	Length of use	Remark
Emperor Xianwu of Southern Yan (r. 398–405 CE)
Yanping 燕平	398–400 CE	3 years	
Jianping 建平	400–405 CE	6 years	
Murong Chao (r. 405–410 CE)
Taishang 太上	405–410 CE	6 years	

=== Western Liang ===
Era name	Period of use	Length of use	Remark
Prince Wuzhao of Western Liang (r. 400–417 CE)
Gengzi 庚子	400–404 CE	5 years	
Jianchu 建初	405–417 CE	13 years	
Li Xin (r. 417–420 CE)
Jiaxing 嘉興	417–420 CE	4 years	
Li Xun (r. 420–421 CE)
Yongjian 永建	420–421 CE	2 years	

=== Hu Xia ===
Era name	Period of use	Length of use	Remark
Emperor Wulie of Hu Xia (r. 407–425 CE)
Longsheng 龍昇	407–413 CE	7 years	
Fengxiang 鳳翔	413–418 CE	6 years	
Changwu 昌武	418–419 CE	3 months	
Zhenxing 真興	419–425 CE	7 years	
Helian Chang (r. 425–428 CE)
Chengguang 承光	419–425 CE	7 years	Or Chengyang (承陽), Yongguang (永光).
Helian Ding (r. 428–431 CE)
Shengguang 勝光	428–431 CE	4 years	

=== Northern Yan ===
Era name	Period of use	Length of use	Remark
Emperor Huiyi of Northern Yan (r. 407–409 CE)
Zhengshi 正始	407–409 CE	3 years	
Emperor Wencheng of Northern Yan (r. 409–430 CE)
Taiping 太平	409–430 CE	22 years	Usage continued by the Emperor Zhaocheng of Northern Yan upon his ascension to the throne.
Emperor Zhaocheng of Northern Yan (r. 430–436 CE)
Taixing 太興	431–436 CE	6 years	

=== Dai ===
Era name	Period of use	Length of use	Remark
Tuoba Shiyiqian (r. 388–376 CE)
Jianguo 建國	388–376 CE	39 years	

=== Ran Wei ===
Era name	Period of use	Length of use	Remark
Emperor Ping of Ran Wei (r. 350–352 CE)
Yongxing 永興	350–352 CE	3 years	

=== Western Yan ===
Era name	Period of use	Length of use	Remark
Emperor Liewen of Western Yan (r. 384 CE)
Yanxing 燕興	384 CE	9 months	
Emperor Wei of Western Yan (r. 385–386 CE)
Gengshi 更始	385–386 CE	2 years	
Duan Sui (r. 386 CE)
Changping 昌平	386 CE	2 months	
Murong Yi (r. 386 CE)
Jianming 建明	386 CE	1 month	
Emperor Wen of Western Yan (r. 386 CE)
Jianping 建平	386 CE	1 month	
Murong Zhong (r. 386 CE)
Jianwu 建武	386 CE	7 months	
Murong Yong (r. 386–394 CE)
Zhongxing 中興	386–394 CE	9 years	

=== Zhai Wei ===
Era name	Period of use	Length of use	Remark
Zhai Liao (r. 388–391 CE)
Jianguang 建光	388–391 CE	4 years	
Zhai Zhao (r. 391–392 CE)
Dingding 定鼎	391–392 CE	2 years	Or Shending (神鼎).

=== Other regimes contemporaneous with Sixteen Kingdoms ===
Era name	Period of use	Length of use	Remark
Gou Quzhi (r. 320 CE)
Pingzhao 平趙	320 CE	1 month	
Hou Ziguang (r. 337 CE)
Longxing 龍興	337 CE	1 month	
Zhang Ju (r. 352 CE)
Jianchang 建昌	352 CE	5 months	
Zhang Yu (r. 374 CE)
Heilong 黑龍	374 CE	4 months	
Zhang Dayu (r. 386–387 CE)
Fenghuang 鳳凰	386 CE	10 months	
Dou Chong (r. 393–394 CE)
Yuanguang 元光	393–394 CE	2 years	
Murong Xiang (r. 397 CE)
Jianshi 建始	397 CE	3 months	
Murong Lin (r. 397 CE)
Yanping 延平	397 CE	4 months	
Lan Han (r. 398 CE)
Qinglong 青龍	398 CE	4 months	
Wang Shi (r. 403 CE)
Taiping 太平	403 CE	1 month	

== Northern and Southern dynasties ==
=== Northern Wei ===
Era name	Period of use	Length of use	Remark
Emperor Daowu of Northern Wei (r. 386–409 CE)
Dengguo 登國	386–396 CE	11 years	
Huangshi 皇始	396–398 CE	3 years	
Tianxing 天興	398–404 CE	7 years	
Tianci 天賜	404–409 CE	6 years	
Emperor Mingyuan of Northern Wei (r. 409–423 CE)
Yongxing 永興	409–413 CE	5 years	
Shenrui 神瑞	414–416 CE	3 years	
Taichang 泰常	416–423 CE	8 years	Usage continued by the Emperor Taiwu of Northern Wei upon his ascension to the throne.
Emperor Taiwu of Northern Wei (r. 423–452 CE)
Shiguang 始光	424–428 CE	5 years	
Shenjia 神䴥	428–431 CE	4 years	
Yanhe 延和	432–435 CE	4 years	
Taiyan 太延	435–440 CE	6 years	
Taipingzhenjun 太平真君	440–451 CE	12 years	
Zhengping 正平	451–452 CE	2 years	
Tuoba Yu (r. 452 CE)
Chengping 承平	452 CE	9 months	Sometimes erroneously referred to as Yongping (永平).
Emperor Wencheng of Northern Wei (r. 452–465 CE)
Xing'an 興安	452–454 CE	3 years	
Xingguang 興光	454–455 CE	2 years	
Tai'an 太安	455–459 CE	5 years	
Heping 和平	460–465 CE	6 years	Usage continued by the Emperor Xianwen of Northern Wei upon his ascension to the throne.
Emperor Xianwen of Northern Wei (r. 465–471 CE)
Tian'an 天安	466–467 CE	2 years	
Huangxing 皇興	467–471 CE	5 years	
Emperor Xiaowen of Northern Wei (r. 471–499 CE)
Yanxing 延興	471–476 CE	6 years	
Chengming 承明	476 CE	7 months	
Taihe 太和	477–499 CE	23 years	Usage continued by the Emperor Xuanwu of Northern Wei upon his ascension to the throne.
Emperor Xuanwu of Northern Wei (r. 499–515 CE)
Jingming 景明	500–504 CE	5 years	
Zhengshi 正始	504–508 CE	5 years	
Yongping 永平	508–512 CE	5 years	
Yanchang 延昌	512–515 CE	4 years	Usage continued by the Emperor Xiaoming of Northern Wei upon his ascension to the throne.
Emperor Xiaoming of Northern Wei (r. 515–528 CE)
Xiping 熙平	516–518 CE	3 years	
Shengui 神龜	518–520 CE	3 years	
Zhengguang 正光	520–525 CE	6 years	
Xiaochang 孝昌	525–528 CE	4 years	
Wutai 武泰	528 CE	5 months	Usage continued by Yuan Zhao upon his ascension to the throne.
Emperor Xiaozhuang of Northern Wei (r. 528–530 CE)
Jianyi 建義	528 CE	6 months	
Yong'an 永安	528–530 CE	3 years	
Yuan Ye (r. 530–531 CE)
Jianming 建明	530–531 CE	2 years	
Emperor Jiemin of Northern Wei (r. 531–532 CE)
Putai 普泰	531 CE	9 months	Or Pujia (普嘉).
Yuan Lang (r. 531–532 CE)
Zhongxing 中興	531–532 CE	2 years	
Emperor Xiaowu of Northern Wei (r. 532–535 CE)
Taichang 太昌	532 CE	9 months	
Yongxing 永興	532 CE	1 month	
Yongxi 永熙	532–534 CE	3 years	

=== Eastern Wei ===
Era name	Period of use	Length of use	Remark
Emperor Xiaojing of Eastern Wei (r. 534–550 CE)
Tianping 天平	534–537 CE	4 years	
Yuanxiang 元象	538–539 CE	2 years	
Xinghe 興和	539–542 CE	4 years	
Wuding 武定	543–550 CE	8 years	

=== Western Wei ===
Era name	Period of use	Length of use	Remark
Emperor Wen of Western Wei (r. 535–551 CE)
Datong 大統	535–551 CE	17 years	
Yuan Qin (r. 551–554 CE)
Qianming 乾明	Unknown	Unknown	

=== Northern Qi ===
Era name	Period of use	Length of use	Remark
Emperor Wenxuan of Northern Qi (r. 550–559 CE)
Tianbao 天保	550–559 CE	10 years	Usage continued by Gao Yin upon his ascension to the throne.
Gao Yin (r. 559–560 CE)
Qianming 乾明	560 CE	8 months	
Emperor Xiaozhao of Northern Qi (r. 560–561 CE)
Huangjian 皇建	560–561 CE	2 years	
Emperor Wucheng of Northern Qi (r. 561–565 CE)
Taining 太寧	561–562 CE	2 years	Or Daning (大寧), Taining (泰寧).
Heqing 河清	562–565 CE	4 years	
Gao Wei (r. 565–577 CE)
Tiantong 天統	565–569 CE	5 years	
Wuping 武平	570–576 CE	7 years	
Longhua 隆化	576 CE	1 month	
Gao Yanzong (r. 576 CE)
Dechang 德昌	576 CE	1 month	
Gao Heng (r. 577 CE)
Chengguang 承光	577 CE	3 months	

=== Northern Zhou ===
Era name	Period of use	Length of use	Remark
Emperor Ming of Northern Zhou (r. 557–560 CE)
Wucheng 武成	559–560 CE	2 years	Usage continued by the Emperor Wu of Northern Zhou upon his ascension to the throne.
Wuding 武定	Unknown	Unknown	
Emperor Wu of Northern Zhou (r. 560–578 CE)
Baoding 保定	561–565 CE	5 years	
Tianhe 天和	566–572 CE	7 years	
Jiande 建德	572–578 CE	7 years	
Xuanzheng 宣政	578 CE	10 months	Usage continued by the Emperor Xuan of Northern Zhou upon his ascension to the throne.
Emperor Xuan of Northern Zhou (r. 578–579 CE)
Dacheng 大成	579 CE	2 months	
Emperor Jing of Northern Zhou (r. 579–581 CE)
Daxiang 大象	579–580 CE	2 years	
Dading 大定	581 CE	2 months	

=== Liu Song ===
Era name	Period of use	Length of use	Remark
Emperor Wu of Liu Song (r. 420–422 CE)
Yongchu 永初	420–422 CE	3 years	Usage continued by Liu Yifu upon his ascension to the throne.
Liu Yifu (r. 422–424 CE)
Jingping 景平	423–424 CE	2 years	
Emperor Wen of Liu Song (r. 424–453 CE)
Yuanjia 元嘉	424–453 CE	30 years	Usage continued by the Emperor Xiaowu of Liu Song upon his ascension to the throne.
Emperor Xiaowu of Liu Song (r. 453–464 CE)
Xiaojian 孝建	454–456 CE	3 years	
Daming 大明	457–464 CE	8 years	Usage continued by Liu Ziye upon his ascension to the throne.
Liu Ziye (r. 464–466 CE)
Yongguang 永光	465 CE	8 months	
Jinghe 景和	465 CE	4 months	
Emperor Ming of Liu Song (r. 466–472 CE)
Taishi 泰始	466–471 CE	6 years	
Taiyu 泰豫	472 CE	1 year	Usage continued by Liu Yu upon his ascension to the throne.
Liu Yu (r. 472–477 CE)
Yuanhui 元徽	473–477 CE	5 years	
Emperor Shun of Liu Song (r. 477–479 CE)
Shengming 昇明	477–479 CE	3 years	

=== Southern Qi ===
Era name	Period of use	Length of use	Remark
Emperor Gao of Southern Qi (r. 479–482 CE)
Jianyuan 建元	479–482 CE	4 years	Usage continued by the Emperor Wu of Southern Qi upon his ascension to the throne.
Emperor Wu of Southern Qi (r. 482–493 CE)
Yongming 永明	483–493 CE	11 years	Usage continued by Xiao Zhaoye upon his ascension to the throne.
Xiao Zhaoye (r. 493–494 CE)
Longchang 隆昌	494 CE	7 months	
Xiao Zhaowen (r. 494 CE)
Yanxing 延興	494 CE	4 months	
Emperor Ming of Southern Qi (r. 494–498 CE)
Jianwu 建武	494–498 CE	5 years	
Yongtai 永泰	498 CE	9 months	Usage continued by Xiao Baojuan upon his ascension to the throne.
Xiao Baojuan (r. 498–501 CE)
Yongyuan 永元	499–501 CE	3 years	
Emperor He of Southern Qi (r. 501–502 CE)
Zhongxing 中興	501–502 CE	2 years	

=== Liang dynasty ===
Era name	Period of use	Length of use	Remark
Emperor Wu of Liang (r. 502–549 CE)
Tianjian 天監	502–519 CE	18 years	
Putong 普通	520–527 CE	8 years	
Datong 大通	527–529 CE	3 years	
Zhongdatong 中大通	529–534 CE	6 years	
Datong 大同	535–546 CE	12 years	
Zhongdatong 中大同	546–547 CE	2 years	
Taiqing 太清	547–549 CE	3 years	Usage continued by the Emperor Jianwen of Liang upon his ascension to the throne.
Emperor Jianwen of Liang (r. 549–551 CE)
Dabao 大寶	550–551 CE	2 years	
Xiao Dong (r. 551 CE)
Tianzheng 天正	551 CE	4 months	
Emperor Yuan of Liang (r. 552–555 CE)
Chengsheng 承聖	552–555 CE	4 years	
Emperor Min of Liang (r. 555 CE)
Tiancheng 天成	555 CE	6 months	
Emperor Jing of Liang (r. 555–557 CE)
Shaotai 紹泰	555–556 CE	2 years	
Taiping 太平	556–557 CE	2 years	

=== Western Liang ===
Era name	Period of use	Length of use	Remark
Emperor Xuan of Western Liang (r. 555–562 CE)
Dading 大定	555–562 CE	8 years	
Emperor Ming of Western Liang (r. 562–585 CE)
Tianbao 天保	562–585 CE	24 years	Usage continued by the Emperor Jing of Western Liang upon his ascension to the throne.
Emperor Jing of Western Liang (r. 585–587 CE)
Guangyun 廣運	586–587 CE	2 years	

=== Chen dynasty ===
Era name	Period of use	Length of use	Remark
Emperor Wu of Chen (r. 557–559 CE)
Yongding 永定	557–559 CE	3 years	Usage continued by the Emperor Wen of Chen upon his ascension to the throne.
Emperor Wen of Chen (r. 559–566 CE)
Tianjia 天嘉	560–566 CE	7 years	
Tiankang 天康	566 CE	11 months	Usage continued by Chen Bozong upon his ascension to the throne.
Chen Bozong (r. 566–568 CE)
Guangda 光大	567–568 CE	2 years	
Emperor Xuan of Chen (r. 568–582 CE)
Taijian 太建	569–582 CE	14 years	Usage continued by Chen Shubao upon his ascension to the throne.
Chen Shubao (r. 582–589 CE)
Zhide 至德	583–586 CE	4 years	
Zhenming 禎明	587–589 CE	3 years	

=== Gaogouli ===
Era name	Period of use	Length of use	Remark
King Guangkaitu of Gaogouli (r. 391–413 CE)
Yongle 永樂	391–412 CE	22 years	
Unknown monarch(s)
Yongkang 永康	Unknown	Unknown	The 7th year of Yongkang might be 396 CE, 418 CE, 483 CE, or 551 CE.
Yanshou 延壽	Unknown	Unknown	The 1st year of Yanshou might be 451 CE or 511 CE.
Jianxing 建興	Unknown	Unknown	The 5th year of Jianxing might be 476 CE, 536 CE, or 596 CE.
Yanjia 延嘉	Unknown	Unknown	The 7th year of Yanjia might be 479 CE or 539 CE.

=== Rouran Khaganate ===
Era name	Period of use	Length of use	Remark
Shouluobuzhen Khagan (r. 464–485 CE)
Yongkang 永康	464–484 CE	21 years	Usage might be from 466 CE to 484 CE, for a total length of 19 years. Also used by Gaochang.
Fumingdun Khagan (r. 485–492 CE)
Taiping 太平	485–491 CE	7 years	
Houqifudaikuzhe Khagan (r. 492–506 CE)
Tai'an 太安	492–505 CE	14 years	
Tuohan Khagan (r. 506–508 CE)
Shiping 始平	506–507 CE	2 years	
Douluofubadoufa Khagan (r. 508–520 CE)
Jianchang 建昌	508–520 CE	13 years	

=== Later Chouchi ===
Era name	Period of use	Length of use	Remark
Yang Nandang (r. 436–442 CE)
Jianyi 建義	436–442 CE	7 years	

=== Gaochang ===
Era name	Period of use	Length of use	Remark
Kan Bozhou (r. 460–477 CE)
Yongkang 永康	466–477 CE	12 years	Adopted the era name of the Shouluobuzhen Khagan.
Kan Yicheng (r. 477–478 CE)
Yongkang 永康	477–478 CE	2 years	Adopted the era name of the Shouluobuzhen Khagan.
Kan Shougui (r. 478–488 CE)
Yongkang 永康	478–485 CE	12 years	Adopted the era name of the Shouluobuzhen Khagan.
Zhang Mengming (r. 488–496 CE)
Jianchu 建初	489–496 CE	8 years	Might be the era name of Kan Shougui from 489 CE to 491 CE, used for a total length of 3 years.
Qu Jia (r. 501–525 CE)
Chengping 承平	502–509 CE	8 years	Usage might be from 502 CE to 510 CE, for a total length of 9 years.
Yixi 義熙	510–525 CE	16 years	Usage might be from 511 CE to 523 CE, for a total length of 13 years.
Qu Guang (r. 525–530 CE)
Ganlu 甘露	525–530 CE	6 years	
Qu Jian (r. 530–548 CE)
Zhanghe 章和	531–548 CE	18 years	
Qu Xuanxi (r. 548–550 CE)
Yongping 永平	549–550 CE	2 years	
Successor to Qu Xuanxi (name unknown) (r. 550–555 CE)
Heping 和平	551–554 CE	4 years	
Qu Baomao (r. 555–560 CE)
Jianchang 建昌	555–560 CE	6 years	
Qu Qiangu (r. 560–601 CE)
Yanchang 延昌	561–601 CE	41 years	
Qu Boya (r. 601–613 CE; first reign)
Yanhe 延和	602–613 CE	12 years	
Usurper (name unknown) (r. 613–619 CE)
Yihe 義和	614–619 CE	6 years	
Qu Boya (r. 620–623 CE; second reign)
Chongguang 重光	620–623 CE	4 years	Usage continued by Qu Wentai upon his ascension to the throne. Might be the era name of Qu Wentai.
Qu Wentai (r. 623–640 CE)
Yanshou 延壽	624–640 CE	17 years	Usage continued by Qu Zhisheng upon his ascension to the throne.

=== Hou Han ===
Era name	Period of use	Length of use	Remark
Hou Jing (r. 551–552 CE)
Taishi 太始	551–552 CE	2 years	

=== Other regimes contemporaneous with Northern and Southern dynasties ===
Era name	Period of use	Length of use	Remark
Baiya Lisi (r. 415–416 CE)
Jianping 建平	415–416 CE	2 years	Usage continued by Liu Hu upon his ascension to the throne.
Li Bao (r. 422–442 CE)
Longxing 龍興	422–442 CE	21 years	
Cheng Daoyang (r. 432–437 CE)
Taishi 泰始	432–437 CE	6 years	
Liu Shao (r. 453 CE)
Taichu 太初	453 CE	3 months	
Lu Shuang (r. 454 CE)
Jianping 建平	454 CE	4 months	
Liu Hun (r. 455 CE)
Yongguang 永光	455 CE	1 month	Or Yuanguang (元光), Yunguang (允光).
Liu Zixun (r. 466 CE)
Yijia 義嘉	466 CE	8 months	
Sima Xiaojun (r. 471 CE)
Shengjun 聖君	471 CE	1 year	
Tang Yuzhi (r. 486 CE)
Xingping 興平	486 CE	1 year	
Yong Daoxi (r. 500 CE)
Jianyi 建義	500 CE	2 months	
Fan Su'an (r. 503–504 CE)
Zhengshi 正始	Unknown	Unknown	
Lü Gou'er (r. 506 CE)
Jianming 建明	506 CE	7 months	
Chen Zhan (r. 506 CE)
Shengming 聖明	506 CE	7 months	
Emperor Wenjing of Western Wei (r. 508 CE)
Jianping 建平	508 CE	2 months	
Faqing (r. 515 CE)
Dacheng 大乘	515 CE	3 months	
Poliuhan Baling (r. 524–525 CE)
Zhenwang 真王	524–525 CE	2 years	Also used by Du Luozhou.
Mozhe Niansheng (r. 524–527 CE)
Tianjian 天建	524–527 CE	4 years	
Yuan Faseng (r. 525 CE)
Tianqi 天啟	525 CE	3 months	Or Daqi (大啟).
Du Luozhou (r. 525 CE)
Zhenwang 真王	525–528 CE	4 years	Adopted the era name of Poliuhan Baling.
Liu Lisheng (r. 525–535 CE)
Shenjia 神嘉	525–535 CE	11 years	
Xianyu Xiuli (r. 526 CE)
Luxing 魯興	526 CE	8 months	Or Puxing (普興).
Chen Shuangchi (r. 526 CE)
Shijian 始建	Unknown	Unknown	
Ge Rong (r. 526–528 CE)
Guang'an 廣安	526–528 CE	3 years	
Liu Huo, Zheng Bian (r. 527 CE)
Tianshou 天授	527 CE	1 month	
Xiao Baoyin (r. 527–528 CE)
Longxu 隆緒	527–528 CE	2 years	
Xing Gao (r. 528–529 CE)
Tiantong 天統	528–529 CE	2 years	
Moqi Chounu (r. 528–530 CE)
Shenshou 神獸	528–530 CE	3 years	Or Shenhu (神虎), Shenping (神平).
Yuan Hao (r. 529 CE)
Xiaoji 孝基	529 CE	2 months	
Jianwu 建武	529 CE	3 months	
Yuan Yue (r. 530–532 CE)
Gengxing 更興	530–532 CE	3 years	Or Gengxin (更新).
Xianyu Chen (r. 535 CE)
Shangyuan 上願	535 CE	1 year	
Wang Tiaochu, Cao Erlong (r. 536 CE)
Pingdu 平都	536 CE	1 month	
Liu Jinggong (r. 542 CE)
Yonghan 永漢	542 CE	2 months	
Xiao Zhengde (r. 548–549 CE)
Zhengping 正平	548–549 CE	2 years	
Xiao Ji (r. 552–553 CE)
Tianzheng 天正	552–553 CE	2 years	
Xiao Zhuang (r. 558–560 CE)
Tianqi 天啟	558–560 CE	3 years	
Liu Moduo (r. 577 CE)
Shiping 石平	577 CE	1 month	
Gao Shaoyi (r. 578 CE)
Wuping 武平	578 CE	1 year	Might be a continuation of the era name of Gao Wei.
Unknown
Antai 安太	Unknown	Unknown	
Unknown
Baique 白雀	Unknown	Unknown	

== Sui dynasty ==
=== Sui dynasty ===
Era name	Period of use	Length of use	Remark
Emperor Wen of Sui (r. 581–604 CE)
Kaihuang 開皇	581–600 CE	20 years	
Renshou 仁壽	601–604 CE	4 years	Usage continued by the Emperor Yang of Sui upon his ascension to the throne.
Emperor Yang of Sui (r. 604–618 CE)
Daye 大業	605–618 CE	14 years	
Yang You (r. 617–618 CE)
Yining 義寧	617–618 CE	2 years	
Yang Tong (r. 618–619 CE)
Huangtai 皇泰	618–619 CE	2 years	

=== Other regimes contemporaneous with Sui dynasty ===
Era name	Period of use	Length of use	Remark
Xiang Haiming (r. 613 CE)
Bainiao 白鳥	613 CE	1 month	
Liu Jialun (r. 614 CE)
Dashi 大世	614 CE	1 month	
Zhu Can (r. 615–619 CE)
Changda 昌達	615–619 CE	5 years	Usage might be from 618 CE to 619 CE, for a total length of 2 years.
Cao Shiqi (r. 616 CE)
Shixing 始興	616 CE	1 month	Or Tiancheng (天成).
Lin Shihong (r. 616–622 CE)
Taiping 太平	616–622 CE	7 years	Or Yankang (延康), Tiancheng (天成).
Dou Jiande (r. 617–621 CE)
Dingchou 丁丑	617–618 CE	2 years	
Wufeng 五鳳	618–621 CE	4 years	
Li Mi (r. 617–618 CE)
Yongping 永平	617–618 CE	2 years	
Liu Wuzhou (r. 617–620 CE)
Tianxing 天興	617–620 CE	4 years	
Guo Zihe (r. 617–618 CE)
Zhengping 正平	617–618 CE	2 years	Or Chouping (丑平).
Xue Ju (r. 617–618 CE)
Qinxing 秦興	617–618 CE	2 years	Sometimes erroneously referred to as Taixing (泰興).
Xiao Xian (r. 617–621 CE)
Mingfeng 鳴鳳	617–621 CE	5 years	Or Fengming (鳳鳴).
Li Gui (r. 617–619 CE)
Anle 安樂	617–619 CE	3 years	
Cao Wuche (r. 617 CE)
Tongsheng 通聖	617 CE	1 month	
Liang Shidu (r. 618–628 CE)
Yonglong 永隆	618–628 CE	11 years	

== Tang dynasty ==
=== Tang dynasty ===
Era name	Period of use	Length of use	Remark
Emperor Gaozu of Tang (r. 618–626 CE)
Wude 武德	618–626 CE	9 years	Usage continued by the Emperor Taizong of Tang upon his ascension to the throne.
Emperor Taizong of Tang (r. 626–649 CE)
Zhenguan 貞觀	627–649 CE	23 years	Or Zhengguan (正觀). Usage continued by the Emperor Gaozong of Tang upon his ascension to the throne.
Emperor Gaozong of Tang (r. 649–683 CE)
Yonghui 永徽	650–655 CE	6 years	Also used by Silla.
Xianqing 顯慶	656–661 CE	6 years	Or Mingqing (明慶), Guangqing (光慶). Also used by Silla.
Longshuo 龍朔	661–663 CE	3 years	Also used by Silla.
Linde 麟德	664–665 CE	2 years	Also used by Silla.
Qianfeng 乾封	666–668 CE	3 years	Also used by Silla.
Zongzhang 總章	668–670 CE	3 years	Also used by Silla.
Xianheng 咸亨	670–674 CE	5 years	Also used by Silla.
Shangyuan 上元	674–676 CE	3 years	Also used by Silla.
Yifeng 儀鳳	676–679 CE	4 years	Also used by Silla.
Tiaolu 調露	679–680 CE	2 years	Also used by Silla.
Yonglong 永隆	680–681 CE	2 years	Or Yongchong (永崇). Also used by Silla.
Kaiyao 開耀	681–682 CE	2 years	Also used by Silla.
Yongchun 永淳	682–683 CE	2 years	Also used by Silla.
Hongdao 弘道	683 CE	1 month	Also used by Silla.
Emperor Zhongzong of Tang (r. 684 CE; first reign)
Sisheng 嗣聖	684 CE	2 months	Also used by Silla.
Emperor Ruizong of Tang (r. 684–690 CE; first reign)
Wenming 文明	684 CE	7 months	Also used by Silla.
Guangzhai 光宅	684 CE	4 months	Also used by Silla.
Chuigong 垂拱	685–688 CE	4 years	Also used by Silla.
Yongchang 永昌	689 CE	11 months	Also used by Silla.
Zaichu 載初	689–690 CE	2 years	Also used by Silla.

=== Wu Zhou ===
Era name	Period of use	Length of use	Remark
Wu Zhao (r. 690–705 CE)
Tianshou 天授	690–692 CE	3 years	Also used by Silla.
Ruyi 如意	692 CE	6 months	Also used by Silla.
Changshou 長壽	692–694 CE	3 years	Also used by Silla.
Yanzai 延載	694 CE	8 months	Also used by Silla.
Zhengsheng 証聖	695 CE	9 months	Also used by Silla.
Tiancewansui 天冊萬歲	695 CE	3 months	Also used by Silla.
Wansuidengfeng 萬歲登封	695–696 CE	4 months	Also used by Silla.
Wansuitongtian 萬歲通天	696–697 CE	2 years	Also used by Silla.
Shengong 神功	697 CE	4 months	Also used by Silla.
Shengli 聖曆	698–700 CE	3 years	Also used by Silla.
Jiushi 久視	700–701 CE	2 years	Also used by Silla.
Dazu 大足	701 CE	10 months	Also used by Silla.
Chang'an 長安	701–704 CE	4 years	Also used by Silla.
Shenlong 神龍	705–707 CE	3 years	Usage continued by the Emperor Zhongzong of Tang upon his second ascension to the throne. Also used by Silla.

=== Tang dynasty (restored) ===
Era name	Period of use	Length of use	Remark
Emperor Zhongzong of Tang (r. 705–710 CE; second reign)
Jinglong 景龍	707–710 CE	4 years	Also used by Silla.
Emperor Shang of Tang (r. 710 CE)
Tanglong 唐隆	710 CE	2 months	Or Tangyuan (唐元), Tangxing (唐興), Tang'an (唐安). Also used by Silla.
Emperor Ruizong of Tang (r. 710–712 CE; second reign)
Jingyun 景雲	710–712 CE	3 years	Also used by Silla.
Taiji 太極	712 CE	4 months	Also used by Silla.
Yanhe 延和	712 CE	4 months	Also used by Silla.
Emperor Xuanzong of Tang (r. 712–756 CE)
Xiantian 先天	712–713 CE	2 years	Also used by Silla.
Kaiyuan 開元	713–741 CE	29 years	Also used by Silla.
Tianbao 天寶	742–756 CE	15 years	In the 1st lunar month of the 3rd year of Tianbao, the official term for "year" was switched from "nián" (年) to "zǎi" (載). Also used by Silla.
Emperor Suzong of Tang (r. 756–762 CE)
Zhide 至德	756–758 CE	3 years	The official term used for "year" was "zǎi" (載). Also used by Silla.
Qianyuan 乾元	758–760 CE	3 years	In the 2nd lunar month of the 1st year of Qianyuan, the official term for "year" was switched from "zǎi" (載) back to "nián" (年). Also used by Silla.
Shangyuan 上元	760–761 CE	2 years	Also used by Silla.
Baoying 寶應	762–763 CE	2 years	Usage continued by the Emperor Daizong of Tang upon his ascension to the throne. Also used by Silla.
Emperor Daizong of Tang (r. 762–779 CE)
Guangde 廣德	763–764 CE	2 years	Also used by Silla.
Yongtai 永泰	765–766 CE	2 years	Also used by Silla.
Dali 大曆	766–779 CE	14 years	Also used by Silla.
Emperor Dezong of Tang (r. 779–805 CE)
Jianzhong 建中	780–783 CE	4 years	Also used by Silla.
Xingyuan 興元	784 CE	1 year	Also used by Silla.
Zhenyuan 貞元	785–805 CE	21 years	Also used by Silla.
Emperor Shunzong of Tang (r. 805 CE)
Yongzhen 永貞	805 CE	5 months	Also used by Silla.
Emperor Xianzong of Tang (r. 805–820 CE)
Yuanhe 元和	806–820 CE	15 years	Usage continued by the Emperor Muzong of Tang upon his ascension to the throne. Also used by Silla.
Emperor Muzong of Tang (r. 820–824 CE)
Yongxin 永新	820 CE	1 year	Subsequently, reverted to Yuanhe (元和). Also used by Silla.
Changqing 長慶	821–824 CE	4 years	Usage continued by the Emperor Jingzong of Tang upon his ascension to the throne. Also used by Silla.
Emperor Jingzong of Tang (r. 824–826 CE)
Baoli 寶歷	825–827 CE	3 years	Usage continued by the Emperor Wenzong of Tang upon his ascension to the throne. Also used by Silla.
Emperor Wenzong of Tang (r. 826–840 CE)
Dahe 大和	827–835 CE	9 years	Or Taihe (太和). Also used by Silla.
Kaicheng 開成	836–840 CE	5 years	Usage continued by the Emperor Wuzong of Tang upon his ascension to the throne. Also used by Silla.
Emperor Wuzong of Tang (r. 840–846 CE)
Huichang 會昌	841–846 CE	6 years	Usage continued by the Emperor Xuanzong of Tang upon his ascension to the throne. Also used by Silla.
Emperor Xuanzong of Tang (r. 846–859 CE)
Dazhong 大中	847–860 CE	14 years	Usage continued by the Emperor Yizong of Tang upon his ascension to the throne. Also used by Silla.
Emperor Yizong of Tang (r. 859–873 CE)
Xiantong 咸通	860–874 CE	15 years	Usage continued by the Emperor Xizong of Tang upon his ascension to the throne. Also used by Silla.
Emperor Xizong of Tang (r. 873–888 CE)
Qianfu 乾符	874–879 CE	6 years	Also used by Silla.
Guangming 廣明	880–881 CE	2 years	Also used by Silla.
Zhonghe 中和	881–885 CE	5 years	Also used by Silla.
Guangqi 光啟	885–888 CE	4 years	Also used by Silla.
Wende 文德	888 CE	11 months	Usage continued by the Emperor Zhaozong of Tang upon his ascension to the throne. Also used by Silla.
Emperor Zhaozong of Tang (r. 888–904 CE)
Longji 龍紀	889 CE	1 year	Also used by Silla.
Dashun 大順	890–891 CE	2 years	Also used by Silla.
Jingfu 景福	892–893 CE	2 years	Also used by Silla.
Qianning 乾寧	894–898 CE	5 years	Also used by Silla.
Guanghua 光化	898–901 CE	4 years	Also used by Silla.
Tianfu 天復	901–904 CE	4 years	Also used by the Yang Wu, the Former Shu, and Silla.
Tianyou 天祐	904–907 CE	4 years	Usage continued by the Emperor Ai of Tang upon his ascension to the throne. Also used by the Yang Wu, the Former Shu, the Former Jin, Qi, Wuyue, and Silla.

=== Bohai ===
Era name	Period of use	Length of use	Remark
King Wu of Bohai (r. 719–737 CE)
Ren'an 仁安	720–737 CE	18 years	Usage might be from 718 CE to 737 CE, for a total length of 20 years; or from 719 CE to 737 CE, for a total length of 19 years.
King Wen of Bohai (r. 737–793 CE)
Daxing 大興	738–794 CE	57 years	Usage might be from 737 CE to 774 CE, then from 786 CE to 793 CE, for a total length of 45 years; or from 737 CE to 774 CE, then from 785 CE to 793 CE, for a total length of 46 years.
Baoli 寶曆	774–785 CE	12 years	Usage might be from 774 CE to 786 CE, for a total length of 13 years. Subsequently, reverted to Daxing (大興).
King Cheng of Bohai (r. 793–794 CE)
Zhongxing 中興	794 CE	1 year	
King Kang of Bohai (r. 794–809 CE)
Zhengli 正曆	795–809 CE	15 years	Usage might be from 794 CE to 808 CE, for a total length of 15 years; or from 795 CE to 807 CE, for a total length of 13 years.
King Ding of Bohai (r. 809–812 CE)
Yongde 永德	810–812 CE	3 years	Usage might be from 808 CE to 812 CE, for a total length of 5 years; or from 808 CE to 811 CE, for a total length of 4 years.
King Xi of Bohai (r. 812–817 CE)
Zhuque 朱雀	813–817 CE	5 years	Usage might be from 812 CE to 817 CE, for a total length of 6 years; or from 812 CE to 816 CE, for a total length of 5 years.
King Jian of Bohai (r. 817–818 CE)
Taishi 太始	818 CE	1 year	Usage might be from 813 CE to 817 CE, for a total length of 5 years; or from 817 CE to 818 CE, for a total length of 2 years.
King Xuan of Bohai (r. 818–830 CE)
Jianxing 建興	819–830 CE	12 years	Usage might be from 818 CE to 830 CE, for a total length of 13 years.
Da Yizhen (r. 830–857 CE)
Xianhe 咸和	831–857 CE	27 years	

=== Nanzhao ===
Era name	Period of use	Length of use	Remark
King Shenwu of Nanzhao (r. 748–779 CE)
Zanpuzhong 贊普鐘	752–768 CE	17 years	
Changshou 長壽	769–779 CE	11 years	
King Xiaohuan of Nanzhao (r. 779–808 CE)
Jianlong 見龍	780–783 CE	4 years	
Shangyuan 上元	784 CE–?	Unknown	
Yuanfeng 元封	?–808 CE	Unknown	
King Xiaohui of Nanzhao (r. 808–809 CE)
Yingdao 應道	809 CE	1 year	
King You of Nanzhao (r. 809–816 CE)
Longxing 龍興	810–816 CE	7 years	
King Jing of Nanzhao (r. 816–823 CE)
Quanyi 全義	816–819 CE	4 years	
Dafeng 大豐	820–823 CE	4 years	
King Zhaocheng of Nanzhao (r. 823–859 CE)
Baohe 保和	824–839 CE	16 years	Or Baohe (保合).
Tianqi 天啟	840–859 CE	20 years	
Emperor Jingzhuang of Dali (r. 859–877 CE)
Jianji 建極	860–877 CE	18 years	
Emperor Wuxuan of Dafengmin (r. 877–897 CE)
Zhenming 貞明	878 CE–?	Unknown	Or Zhenmingchengzhidatong (貞明承智大同).
Chengzhi 承智	Unknown	Unknown	Or Zhenmingchengzhidatong (貞明承智大同).
Datong 大同	?–888 CE	Unknown	Or Zhenmingchengzhidatong (貞明承智大同).
Cuoye 嵯耶	889–897 CE	9 years	
Emperor Xiao'ai of Dafengmin (r. 897–902 CE)
Zhongxing 中興	897–902 CE	6 years	

=== Yan ===
Era name	Period of use	Length of use	Remark
Emperor Guanglie of Yan (r. 756–757 CE)
Shengwu 聖武	756–757 CE	2 years	
An Qingxu (r. 757–759 CE)
Zaichu 載初	757 CE	9 months	
Tiancheng 天成	758–759 CE	2 years	Or Tianhe (天和), Zhicheng (至成).
Emperor Zhaowu of Yan (r. 759–761 CE)
Yingtian 應天	759 CE	3 months	
Shuntian 順天	759–761 CE	3 years	
Shi Chaoyi (r. 761–763 CE)
Xiansheng 顯聖	761–763 CE	3 years	

=== Tibetan Empire ===
Era name	Period of use	Length of use	Remark
Ralpacan (r. 816–838 CE)
Yitai 彝泰	815–838 CE	24 years	

=== Kingdom of Khotan ===
Era name	Period of use	Length of use	Remark
Viśa' Saṃbhava (r. 912–966 CE)
Tongqing 同慶	912–966 CE	55 years	Or Kaiqing (開慶).
Viśa' Śūra (r. 966–977 CE)
Tianzun 天尊	967–977 CE	11 years	
Viśa' Dharma (r. 977–985 CE)
Zhongxing 中興	978–985 CE	8 years	
Viśa' Sangrāma (r. 985–999 CE)
Tianxing 天興	986–999 CE	14 years	
Unknown
Tianshou 天壽	999–1001 CE	3 years	Usage might be from 999 CE to 1005 CE, for a total length of 7 years.

=== Other regimes contemporaneous with Tang dynasty ===
Era name	Period of use	Length of use	Remark
Yuwen Huaji (r. 618–619 CE)
Tianshou 天壽	618–619 CE	2 years	
Gao Kaidao (r. 618–624 CE)
Shixing 始興	618–624 CE	7 years	Or Tiancheng (天成).
Gao Tancheng (r. 618 CE)
Falun 法輪	618 CE	1 month	
Shen Faxing (r. 618–621 CE)
Yankang 延康	619–620 CE	2 years	
Wang Shichong (r. 619–621 CE)
Kaiming 開明	619–621 CE	3 years	
Li Zitong (r. 619–621 CE)
Mingzheng 明政	619–621 CE	3 years	
Liu Heita (r. 622–623 CE)
Tianzao 天造	622–623 CE	2 years	
Fu Gongshi (r. 623–624 CE)
Tianming 天明	623–624 CE	2 years	
Qiande 乾德	Unknown	Unknown	
Wang Mosha (r. 623 CE)
Jintong 進通	623 CE	1 year	
Li Chongfu (r. 710 CE)
Zhongyuankefu 中元克復	710 CE	2 months	Or Zhongzongkefu (中宗克復).
Duan Zizhang (r. 761 CE)
Huanglong 黃龍	761 CE	3 months	
Li Zhen (r. 761 CE)
Zhengde 正德	761 CE	1 year	
Yuan Chao (r. 762–763 CE)
Baosheng 寶勝	762–763 CE	2 years	Or Shengguo (升國).
Zhu Ci (r. 783–784 CE)
Yingtian 應天	783 CE	3 months	
Tianhuang 天皇	784 CE	6 months	
Li Xilie (r. 784–786 CE)
Wucheng 武成	784–786 CE	3 years	
Qiu Fu (r. 860 CE)
Luoping 羅平	860 CE	7 months	
Huang Chao (r. 878–884 CE)
Wangba 王霸	878–880 CE	3 years	
Jintong 金統	880–884 CE	5 years	
Li Yun (r. 886 CE)
Jianzhen 建貞	886 CE	3 months	Or Yongzhen (永貞).
Dong Chang (r. 895–896 CE)
Shuntian 順天	895–896 CE	2 years	Or Dasheng (大聖), Tiance (天冊), Tiansheng (天聖).
Prince Pu of Tang dynasty
Tianshou 天壽	Unknown	Unknown	

== Five Dynasties and Ten Kingdoms ==
=== Later Liang ===
Era name	Period of use	Length of use	Remark
Emperor Taizu of Later Liang (r. 907–912 CE)
Kaiping 開平	907–911 CE	5 years	Also used by Min and Silla.
Qianhua 乾化	911–913 CE	3 years	Usage later restored during the reign of Zhu Youzhen. Also used by Wuyue, Min, and Silla.
Zhu Yougui (r. 912–913 CE)
Fengli 鳳曆	913 CE	2 months	Also used by Wuyue and Silla.
Zhu Youzhen (r. 913–923 CE)
Qianhua 乾化	913–915 CE	3 years	Restored the era name of the Emperor Taizu of Later Liang. Also used by Wuyue, Min, and Silla.
Zhenming 貞明	915–921 CE	7 years	Also used by Wuyue, Min, and Silla.
Longde 龍德	921–923 CE	3 years	Also used by Wuyue, Min, and Silla.

=== Later Tang ===
Era name	Period of use	Length of use	Remark
Emperor Zhuangzong of Later Tang (r. 923–926 CE; as Emperor of Later Tang)
Tongguang 同光	923–926 CE	4 years	Also used by Min, Jingnan and Silla.
Emperor Mingzong of Later Tang (r. 926–933 CE)
Tiancheng 天成	926–930 CE	5 years	Also used by the Ma Chu, Min, Jingnan and Silla.
Changxing 長興	930–933 CE	4 years	Also used by the Ma Chu, Min, Jingnan, Silla, and Goryeo.
Emperor Min of Later Tang (r. 933–934 CE)
Yingshun 應順	934 CE	4 months	Also used by the Ma Chu, Wuyue, Jingnan, Silla, and Goryeo.
Li Congke (r. 934–937 CE)
Qingtai 清泰	934–936 CE	3 years	Also used by the Ma Chu, Wuyue, Jingnan, Silla, and Goryeo.

=== Later Jin ===
Era name	Period of use	Length of use	Remark
Emperor Gaozu of Later Jin (r. 936–942 CE)
Tianfu 天福	936–944 CE	9 years	Usage continued by the Emperor Chu of Later Jin upon his ascension to the throne. Also used by the Later Han, the Ma Chu, Wuyue, Jingnan, and Goryeo.
Emperor Chu of Later Jin (r. 942–947 CE)
Kaiyun 開運	944–946 CE	3 years	Also used by the Ma Chu, Wuyue, Jingnan, and Goryeo.

=== Later Han ===
Era name	Period of use	Length of use	Remark
Emperor Gaozu of Later Han (r. 947–948 CE)
Tianfu 天福	947 CE	1 year	Adopted the era name of the Emperor Gaozu of Later Jin.
Qianyou 乾祐	948–950 CE	3 years	Usage continued by the Emperor Yin of Later Han upon his ascension to the throne. Also used by the Ma Chu, Wuyue, Jingnan, the Northern Han, and Goryeo.

=== Later Zhou ===
Era name	Period of use	Length of use	Remark
Emperor Taizu of Later Zhou (r. 951–954 CE)
Guangshun 廣順	951–953 CE	3 years	Also used by Wuyue, Jingnan, and Goryeo.
Xiande 顯德	954–960 CE	7 years	Usage continued by the Emperor Shizong of Later Zhou and the Emperor Gong of Later Zhou upon their ascension to the throne. Also used by Wuyue, Jingnan, the Southern Tang, and Goryeo.

=== Former Shu ===
Era name	Period of use	Length of use	Remark
Emperor Gaozu of Former Shu (r. 907–918 CE)
Tianfu 天復	907 CE	1 month	Adopted the era name of the Emperor Zhaozong of Tang.
Wucheng 武成	908–910 CE	3 years	
Yongping 永平	911–915 CE	5 years	
Tongzheng 通正	916 CE	1 year	
Tianhan 天漢	917 CE	1 year	
Guangtian 光天	918 CE	1 year	Or Guangda (光大), Guangda (廣大). Usage continued by Wang Yan upon his ascension to the throne.
Wang Yan (r. 918–925 CE)
Qiande 乾德	919–924 CE	6 years	
Xiankang 咸康	925 CE	11 months	

=== Yang Wu ===
Era name	Period of use	Length of use	Remark
Emperor Taizu of Yang Wu (r. 902–905 CE)
Tianfu 天復	902–904 CE	3 years	Adopted the era name of the Emperor Zhaozong of Tang.
Tianyou 天祐	904–905 CE	2 years	Adopted the era name of the Emperor Zhaozong of Tang.
Emperor Liezu of Yang Wu (r. 905–908 CE)
Tianyou 天祐	905–908 CE	4 years	Adopted the era name of the Emperor Zhaozong of Tang.
Emperor Gaozu of Yang Wu (r. 908–920 CE)
Tianyou 天祐	908–919 CE	12 years	Adopted the era name of the Emperor Zhaozong of Tang.
Wuyi 武義	919–921 CE	3 years	Or Banyi (頒義). Usage continued by the Emperor Rui of Yang Wu upon his ascension to the throne.
Emperor Rui of Yang Wu (r. 920–937 CE)
Shunyi 順義	921–927 CE	7 years	
Qianzhen 乾貞	927–929 CE	3 years	Also used by Jingnan.
Dahe 大和	929–935 CE	7 years	
Tianzuo 天祚	935–937 CE	3 years	

=== Ma Chu ===
Era name	Period of use	Length of use	Remark
King Wumu of Ma Chu (r. 907–930 CE)
Tiancheng 天成	927–930 CE	4 years	Adopted the era name of the Emperor Mingzong of Later Tang.
King Hengyang of Ma Chu (r. 930–932 CE)
Changxing 長興	930–932 CE	3 years	Adopted the era name of the Emperor Mingzong of Later Tang.
King Wenzhao of Ma Chu (r. 932–947 CE)
Changxing 長興	930–932 CE	3 years	Adopted the era name of the Emperor Mingzong of Later Tang.
Yingshun 應順	934 CE	4 months	Adopted the era name of the Emperor Min of Later Tang.
Qingtai 清泰	934–936 CE	3 years	Adopted the era name of Li Congke.
Tianfu 天福	936–944 CE	9 years	Adopted the era name of the Emperor Gaozu of Later Jin.
Kaiyun 開運	944–946 CE	3 years	Adopted the era name of the Emperor Chu of Later Jin.
Ma Xiguang (r. 947–950 CE)
Tianfu 天福	947 CE	1 month	Adopted the era name of the Emperor Gaozu of Later Jin.
Qianyou 乾祐	948–950 CE	3 years	Adopted the era name of the Emperor Gaozu of Later Han.
King Gongxiao of Ma Chu (r. 950–951 CE)
Baoda 保大	950–951 CE	2 years	Adopted the era name of the Emperor Yuanzong of Southern Tang.

=== Wuyue ===
Era name	Period of use	Length of use	Remark
King Taizu of Wuyue (r. 907–932 CE)
Tianyou 天祐	907 CE	1 month	Adopted the era name of the Emperor Zhaozong of Tang.
Tianbao 天寶	908–912 CE	5 years	
Fengli 鳳曆	913 CE	1 month	Adopted the era name of Zhu Yougui.
Qianhua 乾化	913–915 CE	3 years	Adopted the era name of the Emperor Taizu of Later Liang.
Zhenming 貞明	915–921 CE	7 years	Adopted the era name of Zhu Youzhen.
Longde 龍德	921–923 CE	3 years	Adopted the era name of Zhu Youzhen.
Baoda 寶大	924–925 CE	2 years	Or Baotai (寶太).
Baozheng 寶正	926–931 CE	6 years	Or Baozhen (寶貞), Baozhen (保貞).
Guangchu 廣初	Unknown	Unknown	
Zhengming 正明	Unknown	Unknown	
King Shizong of Wuyue (r. 932–941 CE)
Changxing 長興	932–933 CE	2 years	Adopted the era name of the Emperor Mingzong of Later Tang.
Yingshun 應順	934 CE	4 months	Adopted the era name of the Emperor Min of Later Tang.
Qingtai 清泰	934–936 CE	3 years	Adopted the era name of Li Congke.
Tianfu 天福	936–941 CE	6 years	Adopted the era name of the Emperor Gaozu of Later Jin.
King Chengzong of Wuyue (r. 941–947 CE)
Tianfu 天福	941–944 CE	4 years	Adopted the era name of the Emperor Gaozu of Later Jin.
Kaiyun 開運	944–946 CE	3 years	Adopted the era name of the Emperor Chu of Later Jin.
King Zhongxun of Wuyue (r. 947–948 CE)
Tianfu 天福	947 CE	1 year	Adopted the era name of the Emperor Gaozu of Later Jin.
King Zhongyi of Qin (r. 948–978 CE)
Qianyou 乾祐	948–950 CE	3 years	Adopted the era name of the Emperor Gaozu of Later Han.
Guangshun 廣順	951–953 CE	3 years	Adopted the era name of the Emperor Taizu of Later Zhou.
Xiande 顯德	954–960 CE	7 years	Adopted the era name of the Emperor Taizu of Later Zhou.
Jianlong 建隆	960–963 CE	4 years	Adopted the era name of the Emperor Taizu of Song.
Qiande 乾德	963–968 CE	6 years	Adopted the era name of the Emperor Taizu of Song.
Kaibao 開寶	968–976 CE	9 years	Adopted the era name of the Emperor Taizu of Song.
Taipingxingguo 太平興國	976–978 CE	3 years	Adopted the era name of the Emperor Taizong of Song.

=== Min ===
Era name	Period of use	Length of use	Remark
Emperor Taizu of Min (r. 909–925 CE)
Kaiping 開平	909–911 CE	3 years	Adopted the era name of the Emperor Taizu of Later Liang.
Qianhua 乾化	911–915 CE	5 years	Adopted the era name of the Emperor Taizu of Later Liang.
Zhenming 貞明	915–921 CE	7 years	Adopted the era name of Zhu Youzhen.
Longde 龍德	921–923 CE	3 years	Adopted the era name of Zhu Youzhen.
Tongguang 同光	923–925 CE	3 years	Adopted the era name of the Emperor Zhuangzong of Later Tang.
Wang Yanhan (r. 925–926 CE)
Tiancheng 天成	926 CE	1 year	Adopted the era name of the Emperor Mingzong of Later Tang.
Emperor Huizong of Min (r. 926–935 CE)
Tiancheng 天成	926–930 CE	5 years	Adopted the era name of the Emperor Mingzong of Later Tang.
Changxing 長興	930–932 CE	3 years	Adopted the era name of the Emperor Mingzong of Later Tang.
Longqi 龍啟	933–934 CE	2 years	
Yonghe 永和	935–936 CE	2 years	
Emperor Kangzong of Min (r. 935–939 CE)
Tongwen 通文	936–939 CE	4 years	
Emperor Jingzong of Min (r. 939–944 CE)
Yonglong 永隆	939–944 CE	6 years	
Tiande Emperor (r. 943–945 CE)
Tiande 天德	943–945 CE	3 years	

=== Southern Han ===
Era name	Period of use	Length of use	Remark
Emperor Gaozu of Southern Han (r. 917–942 CE)
Qianheng 乾亨	917–925 CE	9 years	
Bailong 白龍	925–928 CE	4 years	
Dayou 大有	928–942 CE	15 years	
Emperor Shang of Southern Han (r. 942–943 CE)
Guangtian 光天	942–943 CE	2 years	
Emperor Zhongzong of Southern Han (r. 943–958 CE)
Yingqian 應乾	943 CE	8 months	
Qianhe 乾和	943–958 CE	16 years	
Liu Chang (r. 958–971 CE)
Dabao 大寶	958–971 CE	14 years	

=== Jingnan ===
Era name	Period of use	Length of use	Remark
Prince Wuxin of Chu (r. 924–929 CE)
Tongguang 同光	924–926 CE	3 years	Adopted the era name of the Emperor Zhuangzong of Later Tang.
Tiancheng 天成	926–928 CE	3 years	Adopted the era name of the Emperor Mingzong of Later Tang.
Qianzhen 乾貞	928 CE	7 months	Adopted the era name of the Emperor Rui of Yang Wu.
Prince Wenxian of Nanping (r. 929–948 CE)
Qianzhen 乾貞	929 CE	6 months	Adopted the era name of the Emperor Rui of Yang Wu.
Tiancheng 天成	929–930 CE	2 years	Adopted the era name of the Emperor Mingzong of Later Tang.
Changxing 長興	930–933 CE	4 years	Adopted the era name of the Emperor Mingzong of Later Tang.
Yingshun 應順	934 CE	4 months	Adopted the era name of the Emperor Mingzong of Later Tang.
Qingtai 清泰	934–936 CE	3 years	Adopted the era name of Li Congke.
Tianfu 天福	936–944 CE	9 years	Adopted the era name of the Emperor Gaozu of Later Jin.
Kaiyun 開運	944–946 CE	3 years	Adopted the era name of the Emperor Chu of Later Jin.
Tianfu 天福	947 CE	1 year	Adopted the era name of the Emperor Gaozu of Later Jin.
Qianyou 乾祐	948 CE	10 months	Adopted the era name of the Emperor Gaozu of Later Han.
Prince Zhenyi of Nanping (r. 948–960 CE)
Qianyou 乾祐	948–950 CE	3 years	Adopted the era name of the Emperor Gaozu of Later Han.
Guangshun 廣順	951–953 CE	3 years	Adopted the era name of the Emperor Taizu of Later Zhou.
Xiande 顯德	954–960 CE	7 years	Adopted the era name of the Emperor Taizu of Later Zhou.
Gao Baoxu (r. 960–962 CE)
Jianlong 建隆	960–962 CE	3 years	Adopted the era name of the Emperor Taizu of Song.
Gao Jichong (r. 962–963 CE)
Jianlong 建隆	962–963 CE	2 years	Adopted the era name of the Emperor Taizu of Song.

=== Later Shu ===
Era name	Period of use	Length of use	Remark
Emperor Gaozu of Later Shu (r. 934 CE)
Mingde 明德	934–937 CE	4 years	Usage continued by Meng Chang upon his ascension to the throne.
Meng Chang (r. 934–965 CE)
Guangzheng 廣政	938–965 CE	28 years	

=== Southern Tang ===
Era name	Period of use	Length of use	Remark
Emperor Liezu of Southern Tang (r. 937–943 CE)
Shengyuan 昇元	937–943 CE	7 years	Or Shengyuan (升元).
Emperor Yuanzong of Southern Tang (r. 943–961 CE)
Baoda 保大	943–957 CE	15 years	Also used by the Ma Chu.
Zhongxing 中興	958 CE	2 months	
Jiaotai 交泰	958 CE	3 months	
Xiande 顯德	958–961 CE	4 years	Adopted the era name of the Emperor Taizu of Later Zhou for external purposes. The era name Jiaotai (交泰) remained in use for domestic purposes.
Li Yu (r. 961–975 CE)
Xiande 顯德	961–962 CE	2 years	Adopted the era name of the Emperor Taizu of Later Zhou for external purposes. The era name Jiaotai (交泰) remained in use for domestic purposes.
Jianlong 建隆	963 CE	1 year	Adopted the era name of the Emperor Taizu of Song.
Qiande 乾德	963–968 CE	6 years	Adopted the era name of the Emperor Taizu of Song.
Kaibao 開寶	968–975 CE	8 years	Adopted the era name of the Emperor Taizu of Song.

=== Northern Han ===
Era name	Period of use	Length of use	Remark
Emperor Shizu of Northern Han (r. 951–954 CE)
Qianyou 乾祐	951–954 CE	4 years	Adopted the era name of the Emperor Gaozu of Later Han.
Emperor Ruizong of Northern Han (r. 954–968 CE)
Qianyou 乾祐	954–956 CE	3 years	Adopted the era name of the Emperor Gaozu of Later Han.
Tianhui 天會	957–973 CE	17 years	Usage continued by Liu Ji'en and the Emperor Yingwu of Northern Han upon their ascension to the throne.
Emperor Yingwu of Northern Han (r. 968–979 CE)
Guangyun 廣運	974–979 CE	6 years	

=== Qi ===
Era name	Period of use	Length of use	Remark
Li Maozhen (r. 901–924 CE)
Tianyou 天祐	904–924 CE	21 years	Adopted the era name of the Emperor Zhaozong of Tang.

=== Dachanghe ===
Era name	Period of use	Length of use	Remark
Emperor Huan of Dachanghe (r. 902–909 CE)
Anguo 安國	903–909 CE	7 years	
Emperor Suwen of Dachanghe (r. 909–926 CE)
Shiyuan 始元	910 CE–?	Unknown	Or Xiaozhi (孝治).
Tianruijingxing 天瑞景星	Unknown	Unknown	Or Tianrui (天瑞).
Anhe 安和	Unknown	Unknown	
Zhenyou 貞祐	Unknown	Unknown	
Chuli 初歷	?–926 CE	Unknown	
Emperor Gonghui of Dachanghe (r. 926–928 CE)
Tianying 天應	927 CE	1 year	

=== Datianxing ===
Era name	Period of use	Length of use	Remark
Emperor Daokang of Datianxing (r. 928–929 CE)
Zunsheng 尊聖	928–929 CE	2 years	

=== Dayining ===
Era name	Period of use	Length of use	Remark
Emperor Sugong of Dayining (r. 929–930 CE)
Xingsheng 興聖	930 CE	1 year	
Yang Zhao (r. 930–937 CE)
Daming 大明	931–937 CE	7 years	
Dingxin 鼎新	Unknown	Unknown	
Guangsheng 光聖	Unknown	Unknown	Or Kesheng (克聖).

=== Former Jin ===
Era name	Period of use	Length of use	Remark
Li Keyong (r. 896–908 CE)
Tianyou 天祐	904–908 CE	5 years	Adopted the era name of the Emperor Zhaozong of Tang.
Li Cunxu (r. 908–923 CE; as Prince of Former Jin)
Tianyou 天祐	908–923 CE	16 years	Adopted the era name of the Emperor Zhaozong of Tang.

=== Yan ===
Era name	Period of use	Length of use	Remark
Liu Shouguang (r. 911–914 CE)
Yingtian 應天	911–913 CE	3 years	

=== Other regimes contemporaneous with Five Dynasties and Ten Kingdoms ===
Era name	Period of use	Length of use	Remark
Unknown
Anguoshengzhi 安國聖治	Unknown	Unknown	Might be the era name of the Emperor Huan of Dachanghe.
Emperor Taizu of Pang (庞太祖) (r. 922–924 CE)
Jisheng 继圣	922–924 CE	2 years	First and last Emperor of Pang.
Zhang Yuxian (r. 942–943 CE)
Yongle 永樂	942–943 CE	2 years	Or Changle (長樂).

== Liao dynasty ==
=== Liao dynasty ===
Era name	Period of use	Length of use	Remark
Emperor Taizu of Liao (r. 916–926 CE)
Shence 神冊	916–922 CE	7 years	
Tianzan 天贊	922–926 CE	5 years	
Tianxian 天顯	926–938 CE	13 years	Usage continued by the Emperor Taizong of Liao upon his ascension to the throne.
Emperor Taizong of Liao (r. 927–947 CE)
Huitong 會同	938–947 CE	10 years	
Datong 大同	947 CE	8 months	Usage continued by the Emperor Shizong of Liao upon his ascension to the throne.
Emperor Shizong of Liao (r. 947–951 CE)
Tianlu 天祿	947–951 CE	5 years	
Emperor Muzong of Liao (r. 951–969 CE)
Yingli 應曆	951–969 CE	19 years	
Emperor Jingzong of Liao (r. 969–982 CE)
Baoning 保寧	969–979 CE	11 years	
Qianheng 乾亨	979–983 CE	5 years	Usage continued by the Emperor Shengzong of Liao upon his ascension to the throne.
Emperor Shengzong of Liao (r. 982–1031 CE)
Tonghe 統和	983–1012 CE	30 years	Also used by Goryeo.
Kaitai 開泰	1012–1021 CE	10 years	Also used by Goryeo.
Taiping 太平	1021–1031 CE	11 years	Also used by Goryeo.
Emperor Xingzong of Liao (r. 1031–1055 CE)
Jingfu 景福	1031–1032 CE	2 years	
Chongxi 重熙	1032–1055 CE	24 years	Or Chonghe (重和), Chongxi (崇熙). Also used by Goryeo.
Emperor Daozong of Liao (r. 1055–1101 CE)
Qingning 清寧	1055–1064 CE	10 years	Also used by Goryeo.
Xianyong 咸雍	1065–1074 CE	10 years	Also used by Goryeo.
Dakang 大康	1075–1084 CE	10 years	Or Taikang (太康). Also used by Goryeo.
Da'an 大安	1085–1094 CE	10 years	Also used by Goryeo.
Shouchang 壽昌	1095–1101 CE	7 years	Or Shoulong (壽隆), Shengchang (盛昌). Also used by Goryeo.
Emperor Tianzuo of Liao (r. 1101–1125 CE)
Qiantong 乾統	1101–1110 CE	10 years	Or Qiantong (乾通). Also used by Goryeo.
Tianqing 天慶	1111–1120 CE	10 years	Also used by Goryeo.
Baoda 保大	1121–1125 CE	5 years	

=== Dongdan ===
Era name	Period of use	Length of use	Remark
Yelü Bei (r. 926–937 CE)
Ganlu 甘露	926–936 CE	11 years	

=== Ding'an ===
Era name	Period of use	Length of use	Remark
Wu Xuanming (r. 976–986 CE)
Yuanxing 元興	976 CE–?	Unknown	

=== Xingliao ===
Era name	Period of use	Length of use	Remark
Da Yanlin (r. 1029–1030 CE)
Tianqing 天慶	1029–1030 CE	2 years	

=== Northern Liao ===
Era name	Period of use	Length of use	Remark
Emperor Xuanzong of Northern Liao (r. 1122 CE)
Jianfu 建福	1122 CE	4 months	Or Tianfu (天福).
Xiao Puxiannü (r. 1122 CE; as regent)
Dexing 德興	1122 CE	7 months	
Yelü Yali (r. 1123 CE)
Shenli 神曆	1123 CE	6 months	

=== Western Liao ===
Era name	Period of use	Length of use	Remark
Emperor Dezong of Western Liao (r. 1124–1143 CE)
Yanqing 延慶	1124–1133 CE	10 years	Usage might be from 1125 CE to 1133 CE, for a total length of 9 years.
Kangguo 康國	1134–1143 CE	10 years	Usage might be from 1127 CE to 1136 CE, for a total length of 10 years.
Xiao Tabuyan (r. 1143–1150 CE; as regent)
Xianqing 咸清	1144–1150 CE	7 years	Usage might be from 1136 CE to 1142 CE, for a total length of 7 years.
Gantian 感天	Unknown	Unknown	
Emperor Renzong of Western Liao (r. 1150–1163 CE)
Shaoxing 紹興	1151–1163 CE	13 years	Usage might be from 1142 CE to 1154 CE, for a total length of 13 years.
Xuxing 續興	Unknown	Unknown	
Muxing 穆興	Unknown	Unknown	
Yelü Pusuwan (r. 1163–1177 CE; as regent)
Chongfu 崇福	1164–1177 CE	14 years	Usage might be from 1154 CE to 1168 CE, for a total length of 15 years.
Huangde 皇德	Unknown	Unknown	
Zhongde 重德	Unknown	Unknown	
Yelü Zhilugu (r. 1177–1211 CE)
Tianxi 天禧	1178–1211 CE	34 years	Or Tianxi (天喜). Usage might be from 1168 CE to 1201 CE, for a total length of 34 years.

=== Other regimes contemporaneous with Liao dynasty ===
Era name	Period of use	Length of use	Remark
Gao Yongchang (r. 1116 CE)
Longji 隆基	1116 CE	4 months	Or Yingshun (應順).
Huilibao (r. 1123 CE)
Tianfu 天復	1123 CE	8 months	
Xiao Gan (r. 1123 CE)
Tiansi 天嗣	1123 CE	1 year	Or Tianxing (天興), Tianfu (天阜).

== Song dynasty ==
=== Northern Song ===
Era name	Period of use	Length of use	Remark
Emperor Taizu of Song (r. 960–976 CE)
Jianlong 建隆	960–963 CE	4 years	Also used by Wuyue, Jingnan, and the Southern Tang.
Qiande 乾德	963–968 CE	6 years	Also used by Wuyue, the Southern Tang, and Goryeo.
Kaibao 開寶	968–976 CE	9 years	Usage continued by the Emperor Taizong of Song upon his ascension to the throne. Also used by Wuyue, the Southern Tang, and Goryeo.
Emperor Taizong of Song (r. 976–997 CE)
Taipingxingguo 太平興國	976–984 CE	9 years	Also used by Wuyue and Goryeo.
Yongxi 雍熙	984–987 CE	4 years	Also used by Goryeo.
Duangong 端拱	988–989 CE	2 years	Also used by Goryeo.
Chunhua 淳化	990–994 CE	5 years	Also used by Goryeo.
Zhidao 至道	995–997 CE	3 years	Usage continued by the Emperor Zhenzong of Song upon his ascension to the throne. Also used by Goryeo.
Emperor Zhenzong of Song (r. 997–1022 CE)
Xianping 咸平	998–1003 CE	6 years	
Jingde 景德	1004–1007 CE	4 years	
Dazhongxiangfu 大中祥符	1008–1016 CE	9 years	Also used by Goryeo.
Tianxi 天禧	1017–1021 CE	5 years	Also used by Goryeo.
Qianxing 乾興	1022 CE	1 year	Usage continued by the Emperor Renzong of Song upon his ascension to the throne. Also used by Goryeo.
Emperor Renzong of Song (r. 1022–1063 CE)
Tiansheng 天聖	1023–1032 CE	10 years	
Mingdao 明道	1032–1033 CE	2 years	
Jingyou 景祐	1034–1038 CE	5 years	
Baoyuan 寶元	1038–1040 CE	3 years	
Kangding 康定	1040–1041 CE	2 years	
Qingli 慶曆	1041–1048 CE	8 years	
Huangyou 皇祐	1049–1054 CE	6 years	
Zhihe 至和	1054–1056 CE	3 years	
Jiayou 嘉祐	1056–1063 CE	8 years	Usage continued by the Emperor Yingzong of Song upon his ascension to the throne.
Emperor Yingzong of Song (r. 1063–1067 CE)
Zhiping 治平	1064–1067 CE	4 years	Usage continued by the Emperor Shenzong of Song upon his ascension to the throne.
Emperor Shenzong of Song (r. 1067–1085 CE)
Xining 熙寧	1068–1077 CE	10 years	
Yuanfeng 元豐	1078–1085 CE	8 years	Usage continued by the Emperor Zhezong of Song upon his ascension to the throne.
Emperor Zhezong of Song (r. 1085–1110 CE)
Yuanyou 元祐	1086–1094 CE	9 years	
Shaosheng 紹聖	1094–1098 CE	5 years	
Yuanfu 元符	1098–1100 CE	3 years	Usage continued by the Emperor Huizong of Song upon his ascension to the throne.
Emperor Huizong of Song (r. 1100–1125 CE)
Jianzhongjingguo 建中靖國	1101 CE	1 year	
Chongning 崇寧	1102–1106 CE	5 years	
Daguan 大觀	1107–1110 CE	4 years	
Zhenghe 政和	1111–1118 CE	8 years	
Chonghe 重和	1118–1119 CE	2 years	
Xuanhe 宣和	1119–1125 CE	7 years	Usage continued by the Emperor Qinzong of Song upon his ascension to the throne.
Emperor Qinzong of Song (r. 1126–1127 CE)
Jingkang 靖康	1126–1127 CE	2 years	

=== Southern Song ===
Era name	Period of use	Length of use	Remark
Emperor Gaozong of Song (r. 1127–1162 CE)
Jianyan 建炎	1127–1130 CE	4 years	
Shaoxing 紹興	1131–1162 CE	32 years	Usage continued by the Emperor Xiaozong of Song upon his ascension to the throne.
Emperor Xiaozong of Song (r. 1162–1189 CE)
Longxing 隆興	1163–1164 CE	2 years	
Qiandao 乾道	1165–1173 CE	9 years	
Chunxi 淳熙	1174–1189 CE	16 years	Originally proposed as Chunxi (純熙). Or Chunxi (湻熙). Usage continued by the Emperor Guangzong of Song upon his ascension to the throne.
Emperor Guangzong of Song (r. 1189–1194 CE)
Shaoxi 紹熙	1190–1194 CE	5 years	Usage continued by the Emperor Ningzong of Song upon his ascension to the throne.
Emperor Ningzong of Song (r. 1194–1224 CE)
Qingyuan 慶元	1195–1200 CE	6 years	
Jiatai 嘉泰	1201–1204 CE	4 years	
Kaixi 開禧	1205–1207 CE	3 years	
Jiading 嘉定	1208–1224 CE	17 years	Usage continued by the Emperor Lizong of Song upon his ascension to the throne.
Emperor Lizong of Song (r. 1224–1264 CE)
Baoqing 寶慶	1225–1227 CE	3 years	
Shaoding 紹定	1228–1233 CE	6 years	
Duanping 端平	1234–1236 CE	3 years	
Jiaxi 嘉熙	1237–1240 CE	4 years	
Chunyou 淳祐	1241–1252 CE	12 years	
Baoyou 寶祐	1253–1258 CE	6 years	
Kaiqing 開慶	1259 CE	1 year	
Jingding 景定	1260–1264 CE	5 years	Usage continued by the Emperor Duzong of Song upon his ascension to the throne.
Emperor Duzong of Song (r. 1264–1274 CE)
Xianchun 咸淳	1265–1274 CE	10 years	Usage continued by the Emperor Gong of Song upon his ascension to the throne.
Emperor Gong of Song (r. 1274–1276 CE)
Deyou 德祐	1275–1276 CE	2 years	
Emperor Duanzong of Song (r. 1276–1278 CE)
Jingyan 景炎	1276–1278 CE	3 years	
Zhao Bing (r. 1278–1279 CE)
Xiangxing 祥興	1278–1279 CE	2 years	Also used by Huang Hua.

=== Former Dali ===
Era name	Period of use	Length of use	Remark
Emperor Taizu of Dali (r. 937–944 CE)
Wende 文德	938 CE–?	Unknown	
Shenwu 神武	?–944 CE	Unknown	
Emperor Wenjing of Dali (r. 944–945 CE)
Wenjing 文經	945 CE	1 year	Sometimes erroneously referred to as Wenjingwulüe (文經武略).
Emperor Shengci of Dali (r. 945–951 CE)
Zhizhi 至治	946–951 CE	6 years	Or Zhizhi (致治). Sometimes erroneously referred to as Zhuzhi (主治).
Emperor Guangci of Dali (r. 952–968 CE)
Mingde 明德	952 CE–?	Unknown	
Guangde 廣德	?–967 CE	Unknown	
Shunde 順德	968 CE	1 year	Or Shengde (聖德).
Emperor Yingdao of Dali (r. 968–985 CE)
Mingzheng 明政	969–985 CE	17 years	Or Mingzheng (明正).
Emperor Zhaoming of Dali (r. 985–1009 CE)
Guangming 廣明	986 CE–?	Unknown	
Mingtong 明統	Unknown	Unknown	
Mingsheng 明聖	Unknown	Unknown	
Mingde 明德	Unknown	Unknown	
Mingzhi 明治	Unknown	Unknown	
Mingfa 明法	Unknown	Unknown	
Mingying 明應	1006 CE–?	Unknown	
Mingyun 明運	?–1009 CE	Unknown	
Emperor Xuansu of Dali (r. 1009–1022 CE)
Mingqi 明啟	1010–1022 CE	13 years	Or Qimingtiansheng (啟明天聖).
Qianxing 乾興	Unknown	Unknown	
Emperor Bingyi of Dali (r. 1022–1026 CE)
Mingtong 明通	1023–1026 CE	4 years	Or Mingtongtiansheng (明通天聖).
Emperor Shengde of Dali (r. 1026–1041 CE)
Zhengzhi 正治	1027–1041 CE	15 years	
Emperor Tianming of Dali (r. 1041–1044 CE)
Shengming 聖明	1042 CE–?	Unknown	
Tianming 天明	?–1044 CE	Unknown	
Emperor Xingzong of Dali (r. 1044–1075 CE)
Bao'an 保安	1045–1052 CE	8 years	
Zheng'an 政安	1053 CE–?	Unknown	Or Zheng'an (正安).
Zhengde 正德	Unknown	Unknown	Or Zhengde (政德).
Baode 保德	?–1074 CE	Unknown	
Tai'an 太安	Unknown	Unknown	
Minghou 明侯	Unknown	Unknown	
Emperor Shangde of Dali (r. 1075–1080 CE)
Shangde 上德	1076 CE	1 year	
Guang'an 廣安	1077–1080 CE	4 years	
Emperor Shangming of Dali (r. 1080–1081 CE)
Shangming 上明	1081 CE	1 year	
Emperor Baoding of Dali (r. 1081–1094 CE)
Baoli 保立	1082 CE	1 year	Or Baoding (保定).
Jian'an 建安	1083–1091 CE	9 years	
Tianyou 天祐	1091–1094 CE	4 years	

=== Dazhong Kingdom ===
Era name	Period of use	Length of use	Remark
Emperor Biaozheng of Dazhong (r. 1094–1096 CE)
Shangzhi 上治	1095 CE	1 year	

=== Later Dali ===
Era name	Period of use	Length of use	Remark
Emperor Zhongzong of Dali (r. 1096–1108 CE)
Tianshou 天授	1096 CE	1 year	
Mingkai 明開	1097–1103 CE	7 years	Or Kaiming (開明).
Tianzheng 天政	1103–1104 CE	2 years	Or Tianzheng (天正).
Wen'an 文安	1104–1108 CE	5 years	
Emperor Xianzong of Dali (r. 1108–1147 CE)
Rixin 日新	1109–1110 CE	2 years	
Wenzhi 文治	1110 CE–?	Unknown	
Yongjia 永嘉	?–1128 CE	Unknown	Sometimes erroneously referred to as Wenjia (文嘉).
Baotian 保天	1129–1137 CE	9 years	Or Tianbao (天保).
Guangyun 廣運	1138–1147 CE	10 years	
Emperor Jingzong of Dali (r. 1147–1171 CE)
Yongzhen 永貞	1148 CE	1 year	
Dabao 大寶	1149–1156 CE	8 years	Or Tianbao (天寶).
Longxing 龍興	1157–1161 CE	5 years	
Shengming 盛明	1162 CE–?	Unknown	
Jiande 建德	?–1171 CE	Unknown	
Emperor Xuanzong of Dali (r. 1172–1200 CE)
Lizhen 利貞	1172–1174 CE	4 years	
Shengde 盛德	1176–1180 CE	5 years	
Jiahui 嘉會	1181–1184 CE	4 years	
Yuanheng 元亨	1185–1195 CE	11 years	Sometimes erroneously referred to as Hengli (亨利).
Ding'an 定安	1195–1200 CE	6 years	Sometimes erroneously referred to as Anding (安定).
Hengshi 亨時	Unknown	Unknown	
Emperor Yingzong of Dali (r. 1200–1204 CE)
Fengli 鳳曆	1200 CE–?	Unknown	
Yuanshou 元壽	?–1204 CE	Unknown	
Emperor Shenzong of Dali (r. 1204–1238 CE)
Tiankai 天開	1205–1225 CE	21 years	
Tianfu 天輔	1226 CE	1 year	
Renshou 仁壽	1227–1238 CE	12 years	
Emperor Xiaoyi of Dali (r. 1238–1251 CE)
Daolong 道隆	1239–1251 CE	13 years	
Duan Xingzhi (r. 1251–1254 CE)
Tianding 天定	1251–1254 CE	4 years	

=== Ziqi Kingdom ===
Era name	Period of use	Length of use	Remark
Axie (r. 1161–1205 CE)
Qianzhen 乾貞	1176 CE	1 year	

=== Other regimes contemporaneous with Song dynasty ===
Era name	Period of use	Length of use	Remark
Duan Sikuang
Shunde 順德	Unknown	Unknown	
Gao Guanyinlong
Xingzheng 興正	Unknown	Unknown	
Gao Guanyinzheng
Zhide 至德	Unknown	Unknown	
Unknown
Daben 大本	Unknown	Unknown	
Unknown
Zhongyuan 鍾元	Unknown	Unknown	
Unknown
Longde 隆德	Unknown	Unknown	
Unknown
Yongdao 永道	Unknown	Unknown	
Li Shun (r. 994 CE)
Yingyun 應運	994 CE	5 months	
Wang Jun (r. 1000 CE)
Huashun 化順	1000 CE	10 months	
Wang Ze (r. 1047–1048 CE)
Desheng 得聖	1047–1048 CE	4 months	Or Desheng (得勝), Desheng (德勝), Detian (得天).
Nong Zhigao (r. 1041–1055 CE)
Jingrui 景瑞	1049–1052 CE	4 years	
Qili 啟歷	1052–1053 CE	2 years	
Duanyi 端懿	Unknown	Unknown	
Dali 大歷	Unknown	Unknown	
Zhao Shen (r. 1102 CE)
Longxing 隆興	1102 CE	1 year	Or Longxing (龍興).
Fang La (r. 1120–1121 CE)
Yongle 永樂	1120–1121 CE	2 years	
Zhao Fu (r. 1129 CE)
Mingshou 明受	1129 CE	2 months	
Zhong Xiang (r. 1130 CE)
Tianzai 天載	1130 CE	2 months	Or Tianzhan (天戰).
Li Herong
Zhengfa 正法	1127 CE	1 year	Also used by Lei Jin.
Lei Jin
Zhengfa 正法	1127 CE	1 year	Adopted the era name of Li Herong.
Renzhi 人知	1130 CE	1 year	Or Renhe (人和).
Li Pobei
Taiping 太平	Unknown	Unknown	
Liu Yu (r. 1130–1137 CE)
Fuchang 阜昌	1130–1137 CE	8 years	
Yang Yao (r. 1133–1135 CE)
Dashengtianwang 大聖天王	1133–1135 CE	3 years	Or Datianshengzheng (大天聖正).
Gengxu 庚戌	Unknown	Unknown	
Wang Fa'en (r. 1141 CE)
Luoping 羅平	1141 CE	1 month	
Li Jie (r. 1179 CE)
Luoping 羅平	1179 CE	5 months	
Wu Xi (r. 1207 CE)
Zhuanyun 轉運	1207 CE	2 months	
Liao Sen (r. 1229 CE)
Zhongde 重德	1229 CE	1 year	
Chen Wan
Tianzhan 天戰	Unknown	Unknown	

== Western Xia ==
Era name	Period of use	Length of use	Remark
Emperor Jingzong of Western Xia (r. 1038–1048 CE)
Xiandao 顯道	1032–1034 CE	3 years	Derived from the era name Mingdao (明道) of the Emperor Renzong of Song.
Kaiyun 開運	1034 CE	1 month	
Guangyun 廣運	1034–1036 CE	3 years	
Daqing 大慶	1036–1038 CE	3 years	
Tianshoulifayanzuo 天授禮法延祚	1038–1048 CE	11 years	Or Tianshou (天授), Tianshoulifayanzuo (天授理法延祚). Usage continued by the Emperor Yizong of Western Xia upon his ascension to the throne.
Guangxi 廣熙	Unknown	Unknown	
Guangmin 廣民	Unknown	Unknown	
Emperor Yizong of Western Xia (r. 1048–1067 CE)
Yansiningguo 延嗣寧國	1049 CE	1 year	Or Ningguo (寧國).
Tianyouchuisheng 天祐垂聖	1050–1052 CE	3 years	Or Chuisheng (垂聖).
Fushengchengdao 福聖承道	1053–1056 CE	4 years	Or Fusheng (福聖), Chengdao (承道).
Duodu 奲都	1057–1062 CE	6 years	
Gonghua 拱化	1063–1067 CE	5 years	Usage continued by the Emperor Huizong of Western Xia upon his ascension to the throne.
Emperor Huizong of Western Xia (r. 1067–1086 CE)
Qiandao 乾道	1068–1069 CE	2 years	Usage might be from 1067 CE to 1068 CE, for a total length of 2 years.
Tiancilishengguoqing 天賜禮盛國慶	1070–1074 CE	5 years	Or Tianciguoqing (天賜國慶). Usage might be from 1069 CE to 1074 CE, for a total length of 6 years.
Da'an 大安	1075–1085 CE	11 years	
Tian'anliding 天安禮定	1086 CE	7 months	
Xi'an 西安	Unknown	Unknown	
Emperor Chongzong of Western Xia (r. 1086–1139 CE)
Tianyizhiping 天儀治平	1086–1089 CE	4 years	
Tianyoumin'an 天祐民安	1090–1097 CE	8 years	
Yong'an 永安	1098–1100 CE	3 years	
Zhenguan 貞觀	1101–1113 CE	13 years	
Yongning 雍寧	1114–1118 CE	5 years	
Yuande 元德	1119–1127 CE	9 years	Or Tiande (天德).
Zhengde 正德	1127–1134 CE	8 years	
Dade 大德	1135–1139 CE	5 years	Usage continued by the Emperor Renzong of Western Xia upon his ascension to the throne.
Emperor Renzong of Western Xia (r. 1139–1193 CE)
Daqing 大慶	1140–1143 CE	4 years	
Renqing 人慶	1144–1148 CE	5 years	
Tiansheng 天盛	1149–1169 CE	21 years	
Qianyou 乾祐	1170–1193 CE	24 years	Usage continued by the Emperor Huanzong of Western Xia upon his ascension to the throne.
Emperor Huanzong of Western Xia (r. 1193–1206 CE)
Tianqing 天慶	1194–1206 CE	13 years	
Emperor Xiangzong of Western Xia (r. 1206–1211 CE)
Yingtian 應天	1206–1209 CE	4 years	
Huangjian 皇建	1210–1211 CE	2 years	
Emperor Shenzong of Western Xia (r. 1211–1223 CE)
Guangding 光定	1211–1223 CE	13 years	
Emperor Xianzong of Western Xia (r. 1223–1226 CE)
Qianding 乾定	1223–1226 CE	4 years	
Li Xian (r. 1226–1227 CE)
Baoyi 寶義	1226–1227 CE	2 years	
Baoqing 寶慶	Unknown	Unknown	
Guangxi 廣僖	Unknown	Unknown	
Qingping 清平	Unknown	Unknown	

== Jin dynasty ==
=== Jin dynasty ===
Era name	Period of use	Length of use	Remark
Emperor Taizu of Jin (r. 1115–1123 CE)
Shouguo 收國	1115–1116 CE	2 years	
Tianfu 天輔	1117–1123 CE	7 years	
Emperor Taizong of Jin (r. 1123–1135 CE)
Tianhui 天會	1123–1137 CE	15 years	Usage continued by the Emperor Xizong of Jin upon his ascension to the throne.
Emperor Xizong of Jin (r. 1135–1150 CE)
Tianjuan 天眷	1138–1140 CE	3 years	
Huangtong 皇統	1141–1149 CE	9 years	Also used by Goryeo.
Wanyan Liang (r. 1150–1161 CE)
Tiande 天德	1149–1153 CE	5 years	Also used by Goryeo.
Zhenyuan 貞元	1153–1156 CE	4 years	Also used by Goryeo.
Zhenglong 正隆	1156–1161 CE	6 years	Also used by Goryeo.
Emperor Shizong of Jin (r. 1161–1189 CE)
Dading 大定	1161–1189 CE	29 years	Also used by Goryeo.
Xingqing 興慶	Unknown	Unknown	
Emperor Zhangzong of Jin (r. 1189–1208 CE)
Mingchang 明昌	1190–1196 CE	7 years	Also used by Goryeo.
Cheng'an 承安	1196–1200 CE	5 years	Also used by Goryeo.
Taihe 泰和	1201–1208 CE	8 years	Also used by Goryeo.
Tianding 天定	Unknown	Unknown	
Wanyan Yongji (r. 1208–1213 CE)
Da'an 大安	1209–1211 CE	3 years	Also used by Goryeo.
Chongqing 崇慶	1212–1213 CE	2 years	Also used by Goryeo.
Zhining 至寧	1213 CE	5 months	Also used by Goryeo.
Emperor Xuanzong of Jin (r. 1213–1224 CE)
Zhenyou 貞祐	1213–1217 CE	5 years	Also used by Goryeo.
Xingding 興定	1217–1222 CE	6 years	Also used by Goryeo.
Yuanguang 元光	1222–1223 CE	2 years	Also used by Goryeo.
Emperor Aizong of Jin (r. 1224–1234 CE)
Zhengda 正大	1224–1231 CE	8 years	
Kaixing 開興	1232 CE	4 months	
Tianxing 天興	1232–1234 CE	3 years	
Wanyan Chenglin (r. 1234 CE)
Shengchang 盛昌	Unknown	Unknown	

=== Eastern Liao ===
Era name	Period of use	Length of use	Remark
Yelü Liuge (r. 1213–1220 CE)
Yuantong 元統	1213–1216 CE	4 years	

=== Later Liao ===
Era name	Period of use	Length of use	Remark
Yelü Sibu (r. 1216 CE)
Tianwei 天威	1216 CE	1 year	Or Tiancheng (天成).
Yelü Qinu (r. 1216 CE; as regent)
Tianyou 天祐	1216 CE	1 year	
Yelü Jinshan (r. 1216–1217 CE)
Tiande 天德	1216 CE	1 year	Or Tianhui (天會), Tiancheng (天成).

=== Eastern Xia ===
Era name	Period of use	Length of use	Remark
Puxian Wannu (r. 1215–1233 CE)
Tiantai 天泰	1215–1223 CE	9 years	
Datong 大同	1224–1233 CE	10 years	

=== Other regimes contemporaneous with Jin dynasty ===
Era name	Period of use	Length of use	Remark
Aoluo (r. 1147 CE)
Tianxing 天興	1147 CE	1 year	
Wanyan Yunwen
Tiantong 天統	Unknown	Unknown	
Yelü Wogan (r. 1161–1162 CE)
Tianzheng 天正	1161 CE	1 month	
Yelü Deshou (r. 1196 CE)
Shensheng 身聖	1196 CE	1 month	
Liu Yongchang (r. 1214 CE)
Tianci 天賜	1214 CE	1 year	
Yang An'er (r. 1214 CE)
Tianshun 天順	1214 CE	8 months	
Zhang Zhi (r. 1215–1217 CE)
Xinglong 興隆	1216–1217 CE	2 years	Or Xinglong (興龍).
Hao Ding (r. 1216 CE)
Shuntian 順天	1216 CE	1 year	

== Yuan dynasty ==
=== Yuan dynasty ===
Era name	Period of use	Length of use	Remark
Emperor Shizu of Yuan (r. 1260–1294 CE)
Zhongtong 中統	1260–1264 CE	5 years	Also used by Goryeo.
Zhiyuan 至元	1264–1294 CE	31 years	Also used by Goryeo.
Emperor Chengzong of Yuan (r. 1294–1307 CE)
Yuanzhen 元貞	1295–1297 CE	3 years	Also used by Goryeo.
Dade 大德	1297–1307 CE	11 years	Usage continued by the Emperor Wuzong of Yuan upon his ascension to the throne. Also used by Goryeo.
Emperor Wuzong of Yuan (r. 1307–1311 CE)
Zhida 至大	1308–1311 CE	4 years	Usage continued by the Emperor Renzong of Yuan upon his ascension to the throne. Also used by Goryeo.
Emperor Renzong of Yuan (r. 1311–1320 CE)
Huangqing 皇慶	1312–1313 CE	2 years	Also used by Goryeo.
Yanyou 延祐	1314–1320 CE	7 years	Usage continued by the Emperor Yingzong of Yuan upon his ascension to the throne. Also used by Goryeo.
Emperor Yingzong of Yuan (r. 1320–1323 CE)
Zhizhi 至治	1321–1323 CE	3 years	Usage continued by the Taiding Emperor upon his ascension to the throne. Also used by Goryeo.
Taiding Emperor (r. 1323–1328 CE)
Taiding 泰定	1324–1328 CE	5 years	Also used by Goryeo.
Zhihe 致和	1328 CE	8 months	Also used by Goryeo.
Tianshun Emperor (r. 1328 CE)
Tianshun 天順	1328 CE	2 months	Also used by Goryeo.
Emperor Wenzong of Yuan (r. 1328–1329 CE; first reign)
Tianli 天歷	1328–1330 CE	3 years	Usage continued by the Emperor Mingzong of Yuan upon his ascension to the throne. Also used by Goryeo.
Emperor Wenzong of Yuan (r. 1329–1332 CE; second reign)
Zhishun 至順	1330–1333 CE	4 years	Usage continued by the Emperor Ningzong of Yuan and the Emperor Huizong of Yuan upon their ascension to the throne. Also used by Goryeo.
Emperor Huizong of Yuan (r. 1333–1370 CE)
Yuantong 元統	1333–1335 CE	3 years	Also used by Goryeo.
Zhiyuan 至元	1335–1340 CE	6 years	Also used by Goryeo.
Zhizheng 至正	1341–1370 CE	30 years	Also used by Goryeo.

=== Northern Yuan ===
Era name	Period of use	Length of use	Remark
Emperor Zhaozong of Northern Yuan (r. 1370–1378 CE)
Xuanguang 宣光	1371–1379 CE	9 years	Usage continued by the Tianyuan Emperor upon his ascension to the throne. Also used by Goryeo.
Tianyuan Emperor (r. 1378–1388 CE)
Tianyuan 天元	1379–1388 CE	10 years	
Choros Esen (r. 1453–1457 CE)
Tianyuan 添元	1453–1457 CE	5 years	Or Tianyuan (天元).

=== Tianwan ===
Era name	Period of use	Length of use	Remark
Xu Shouhui (r. 1351–1360 CE)
Zhiping 治平	1351–1355 CE	5 years	Usage might be from 1351 CE to 1354 CE, for a total length of 4 years.
Taiping 太平	1356–1358 CE	3 years	Usage might be in 1358 CE, for a total length of 1 year.
Tianqi 天啟	1356–1359 CE	4 years	Also used by the Ming Xia.
Tianding 天定	1359–1360 CE	2 years	

=== Zhang Zhou ===
Era name	Period of use	Length of use	Remark
Zhang Shicheng (r. 1354–1367 CE)
Tianyou 天佑	1354–1357 CE	4 years	Or Tianyou (天祐).

=== Han Song ===
Era name	Period of use	Length of use	Remark
Han Lin'er (r. 1355–1366 CE)
Longfeng 龍鳳	1355–1366 CE	12 years	

=== Chen Han ===
Era name	Period of use	Length of use	Remark
Chen Youliang (r. 1360–1363 CE)
Dayi 大義	1360–1363 CE	4 years	
Dading 大定	Unknown	Unknown	
Chen Li (r. 1363–1364 CE)
Deshou 德壽	1363–1364 CE	2 years	

=== Ming Xia ===
Era name	Period of use	Length of use	Remark
Emperor Taizu of Ming Xia (r. 1361–1366 CE)
Tianqi 天啟	1361–1362 CE	2 years	Adopted the era name of Xu Shouhui.
Tiantong 天統	1363–1366 CE	4 years	
Ming Sheng (r. 1366–1371 CE)
Kaixi 開熙	1367–1371 CE	5 years	

=== Other regimes contemporaneous with Yuan dynasty ===
Era name	Period of use	Length of use	Remark
Du Keyong (r. 1280 CE)
Wancheng 萬乘	1280 CE	1 month	
Chen Diaoyan (r. 1281 CE)
Changtai 昌泰	1281 CE	4 months	
Lin Guifang, Zhao Liangkou (r. 1283 CE)
Yankang 延康	1283 CE	1 month	
Huang Hua (r. 1283–1284 CE)
Xiangxing 祥興	1283–1284 CE	2 years	Adopted the era name of Zhao Bing.
Yang Zhenlong (r. 1289 CE)
Anding 安定	1289 CE	9 months	
Chen Kongya (r. 1297 CE)
Zhengzhi 正治	1297 CE	1 month	
Zhu Guangqing (r. 1337 CE)
Chifu 赤符	1337 CE	7 months	
Zhao Pusheng
Zhengshuo 正朔	Unknown	Unknown	

== Ming dynasty ==
=== Ming dynasty ===
Era name	Period of use	Length of use	Remark
Hongwu Emperor (r. 1368–1398 CE)
Hongwu 洪武	1368–1398 CE	31 years	Usage continued by the Jianwen Emperor upon his ascension to the throne. Usage later restored during the reign of the Yongle Emperor. Also used by Goryeo, Joseon, the Satto dynasty, the Haniji dynasty, and the Ōzato dynasty.
Jianwen Emperor (r. 1398–1402 CE)
Jianwen 建文	1399–1402 CE	4 years	Also used by Joseon, the Satto dynasty, the Haniji dynasty, and the Ōzato dynasty.
Yongle Emperor (r. 1402–1424 CE)
Hongwu 洪武	1402 CE	7 months	Restored the era name of the Hongwu Emperor. Also used by Joseon, the Satto dynasty, the Haniji dynasty, and the Ōzato dynasty.
Yongle 永樂	1403–1424 CE	22 years	Usage continued by the Hongxi Emperor upon his ascension to the throne. Also used by Joseon, the Satto dynasty of Chūzan, the Haniji dynasty of Hokuzan, the Ōzato dynasty of Nanzan, and the First Shō dynasty of Ryūkyū Kingdom.
Hongxi Emperor (r. 1424–1425 CE)
Hongxi 洪熙	1425 CE	1 year	Usage continued by the Xuande Emperor upon his ascension to the throne. Also used by Joseon, the Ōzato dynasty of Nanzan, and the First Shō dynasty of Ryūkyū Kingdom.
Xuande Emperor (r. 1425–1435 CE)
Xuande 宣德	1426–1435 CE	10 years	Usage continued by the Emperor Yingzong of Ming upon his ascension to the throne. Also used by Joseon, the Ōzato dynasty of Nanzan, and the First Shō dynasty of Ryūkyū Kingdom.
Emperor Yingzong of Ming (r. 1435–1449 CE; first reign)
Zhengtong 正統	1436–1449 CE	14 years	Usage continued by the Jingtai Emperor upon his ascension to the throne. Also used by Joseon and the First Shō dynasty of Ryūkyū Kingdom.
Jingtai Emperor (r. 1449–1457 CE)
Jingtai 景泰	1450–1457 CE	8 years	Also used by Joseon and the First Shō dynasty of Ryūkyū Kingdom.
Emperor Yingzong of Ming (r. 1457–1464 CE; second reign)
Tianshun 天順	1457–1464 CE	8 years	Usage continued by the Chenghua Emperor upon his ascension to the throne. Also used by Joseon and the First Shō dynasty of Ryūkyū Kingdom.
Chenghua Emperor (r. 1464–1487 CE)
Chenghua 成化	1465–1487 CE	23 years	Usage continued by the Hongzhi Emperor upon his ascension to the throne. Also used by Joseon, the First and the Second Shō dynasty of Ryūkyū Kingdom.
Hongzhi Emperor (r. 1487–1505 CE)
Hongzhi 弘治	1488–1505 CE	18 years	Usage continued by the Zhengde Emperor upon his ascension to the throne. Also used by Joseon and the Second Shō dynasty of Ryūkyū Kingdom.
Zhengde Emperor (r. 1505–1521 CE)
Zhengde 正德	1506–1521 CE	16 years	Usage continued by the Jiajing Emperor upon his ascension to the throne. Also used by Joseon and the Second Shō dynasty of Ryūkyū Kingdom.
Jiajing Emperor (r. 1521–1566 CE)
Jiajing 嘉靖	1522–1566 CE	45 years	Also used by Joseon and the Second Shō dynasty of Ryūkyū Kingdom.
Longqing Emperor (r. 1567–1572 CE)
Longqing 隆慶	1567–1572 CE	6 years	Usage continued by the Wanli Emperor upon his ascension to the throne. Also used by Joseon and the Second Shō dynasty of Ryūkyū Kingdom.
Wanli Emperor (r. 1572–1620 CE)
Wanli 萬曆	1573–1620 CE	48 years	Also used by Joseon and the Second Shō dynasty of Ryūkyū Kingdom.
Taichang Emperor (r. 1620 CE)
Taichang 泰昌	1620–1621 CE	4 months	Usage continued by the Tianqi Emperor upon his ascension to the throne. Also used by Joseon and the Second Shō dynasty of Ryūkyū Kingdom.
Tianqi Emperor (r. 1620–1627 CE)
Tianqi 天啟	1621–1627 CE	7 years	Usage continued by the Chongzhen Emperor upon his ascension to the throne. Also used by Joseon and the Second Shō dynasty of Ryūkyū Kingdom.
Chongzhen Emperor (r. 1627–1644 CE)
Chongzhen 崇禎	1628–1644 CE	17 years	Also used by Joseon and the Second Shō dynasty of Ryūkyū Kingdom.

=== Southern Ming ===
Era name	Period of use	Length of use	Remark
Hongguang Emperor (r. 1644–1645 CE)
Hongguang 弘光	1645 CE	5 months	Also used by the Second Shō dynasty of Ryūkyū Kingdom.
Longwu Emperor (r. 1645–1646 CE)
Longwu 隆武	1645–1646 CE	2 years	Also used by the Second Shō dynasty of Ryūkyū Kingdom and Zhang Huashan.
Zhu Hengjia (r. 1645 CE; as regent)
Xingye 興業	1645 CE	1 month	
Zhu Yihai (r. 1645–1653 CE; as regent)
Jianguo Lu 監國魯	1646–1653 CE	8 years	Not an actual era name, but used in place of an era name and served a similar function; Jianguo literally means "regency" and Lu was derived from Zhi Yihai's noble title "Prince of Lu".
Shaowu Emperor (r. 1646–1647 CE)
Shaowu 紹武	did not use	did not use	The era name Shaowu was originally planned to supersede Longwu (隆武) in 1647 CE, but the Shaowu Emperor's reign ended before the era name was put into effective use.
Yongli Emperor (r. 1646–1662 CE)
Yongli 永曆	1647–1662 CE	16 years	Also used by the Kingdom of Tungning and Wang Guangtai.
Dingwu Emperor (r. 1646–1664 CE)
Dingwu 定武	1646–1663 CE	18 years	
Zhu Changqing (r. 1648–1649 CE; as regent)
Dongwu 東武	1648 CE	1 year	

=== Shun dynasty ===
Era name	Period of use	Length of use	Remark
Li Zicheng (r. 1644–1645 CE)
Yongchang 永昌	1644–1645 CE	2 years	Also used by Gong Wencai.

=== Kingdom of Tungning ===
Era name	Period of use	Length of use	Remark
Zheng Chenggong (r. 1662 CE)
Yongli 永曆	1662 CE	1 year	Adopted the era name of the Yongli Emperor.
Zheng Xi (r. 1662 CE; as regent)
Yongli 永曆	1662 CE	1 year	Adopted the era name of the Yongli Emperor.
Zheng Jing (r. 1662–1681 CE)
Yongli 永曆	1662–1681 CE	20 years	Adopted the era name of the Yongli Emperor.
Zheng Kezang (r. 1681 CE; as regent)
Yongli 永曆	1681 CE	1 year	Adopted the era name of the Yongli Emperor.
Zheng Keshuang (r. 1681–1683 CE)
Yongli 永曆	1681–1683 CE	3 years	Adopted the era name of the Yongli Emperor.

=== Other regimes contemporaneous with Ming dynasty ===
Era name	Period of use	Length of use	Remark
Peng Yulin (r. 1386 CE)
Tianding 天定	1386 CE	1 year	
Tian Jiucheng (r. 1397 CE)
Longfeng 龍鳳	1397 CE	1 year	
Phạm Ngọc (r. 1417–1420 CE)
Yongning 永寧	1417–1420 CE	4 years	
Lê Ngạ (r. 1420 CE)
Yongtian 永天	1420 CE	1 year	
Chen Jianhu (r. 1448–1449 CE)
Taiding 泰定	1448–1449 CE	2 years	
Huang Xiaoyang (r. 1449–1450 CE)
Dongyang 東陽	1449–1450 CE	2 years	
Zhu Huizha (r. 1451 CE)
Xuanyuan 玄元	1451 CE	1 month	Or Xuanwu (玄武), Xuanwu (𢆯武), Yuanwu (元武).
Li Zhen (r. 1456 CE)
Tianshun 天順	1456 CE	1 year	
Wang Bin (r. 1457 CE)
Tianxiu 天繡	1457 CE–?	Unknown	
Li Tianbao (r. 1460 CE)
Wulie 武烈	1460 CE	1 year	
Liu Tong (r. 1465–1466 CE)
Desheng 德勝	1465–1466 CE	2 years	
Cao Fu (r. 1511–1512 CE)
Mingzheng 明正	1511 CE	1 year	
Zhu Chenhao (r. 1519 CE)
Shunde 順德	1519 CE	2 months	
Duan Chang (r. 1520 CE)
Dashunpingding 大順平定	1520 CE	1 year	Or Dashun (大順), Pingding (平定).
Tian Bin (r. 1546 CE)
Tianyuan 天淵	1546 CE	1 year	
Zhang Lian (r. 1560–1562 CE)
Zaoli 造歷	1560–1562 CE	3 years	
Longfei 龍飛	Unknown	Unknown	
Cai Boguan (r. 1565–1566 CE)
Dabao 大寶	1565–1566 CE	2 months	
Li Xin (r. 1619 CE)
Hongwu 洪武	1619 CE	1 month	
Li Wen (r. 1619 CE)
Zhenhun 真混	1619 CE	1 month	Or Tianzhenhun (天真混).
She Chongming (r. 1621–1629 CE)
Ruiying 瑞應	1621 CE	1 month	
Moqi De (r. 1622 CE)
Xuanjing 玄靜	1622 CE	1 year	Or Xuanjing (𢆯靜), Yuanjing (元靜).
Xu Hongru (r. 1622 CE)
Dachengxingsheng 大成興勝	1622 CE	6 months	Or Dachengxingsheng (大乘興勝), Dachengxingsheng (大成興盛), Dachengxingsheng (大乘興盛), Xingsheng (興勝).
Zhang Weiyuan (r. 1628 CE)
Yongxing 永興	1628 CE	1 year	
Gao Yingxiang (r. 1635 CE)
Xingwu 興武	1635 CE	1 year	
Zhang Puwei (r. 1637–1638 CE)
Tianyun 天運	1637 CE	1 year	
Zhang Xianzhong (r. 1644–1646 CE)
Dashun 大順	1644–1646 CE	3 years	Sometimes erroneously referred to as Tianshun (天順).
Yiwu 義武	Unknown	Unknown	
Zhu Cilang (r. 1644 CE)
Yixing 義興	1644 CE	1 month	
Ma Xiang
Yuanmingdabao 圓明大寶	Unknown	Unknown	
Xingwu
Hongrun 宏閏	Unknown	Unknown	
Mingben
Yong'an 湧安	Unknown	Unknown	

== Qing dynasty ==
=== Later Jin ===
Era name	Period of use	Length of use	Remark
Tianming Khan (r. 1616–1626 CE)
Tianming 天命	1616–1626 CE	11 years	
Tiancong Khan (r. 1626–1636 CE; as Khan of Later Jin)
Tiancong 天聰	1627–1636 CE	10 years	

=== Qing dynasty ===
Era name	Period of use	Length of use	Remark
Emperor Taizong of Qing (r. 1636–1643 CE; as Emperor of Qing)
Chongde 崇德	1636–1643 CE	8 years	Usage continued by the Shunzhi Emperor upon his ascension to the throne. Also used by Joseon.
Shunzhi Emperor (r. 1643–1661 CE)
Shunzhi 順治	1644–1661 CE	18 years	Usage continued by the Kangxi Emperor upon his ascension to the throne. Also used by Joseon and the Second Shō dynasty of Ryūkyū Kingdom.
Kangxi Emperor (r. 1661–1722 CE)
Kangxi 康熙	1662–1722 CE	61 years	Usage continued by the Yongzheng Emperor upon his ascension to the throne. Also used by Joseon and the Second Shō dynasty of Ryūkyū Kingdom.
Yongzheng Emperor (r. 1722–1735 CE)
Yongzheng 雍正	1723–1735 CE	13 years	Usage continued by the Qianlong Emperor upon his ascension to the throne. Also used by Joseon and the Second Shō dynasty of Ryūkyū Kingdom.
Qianlong Emperor (r. 1735–1796 CE)
Qianlong 乾隆	1736–1795 CE	60 years	Usage continued within the Forbidden City until 1799 CE, for a total length of 64 years. Also used by Joseon and the Second Shō dynasty of Ryūkyū Kingdom.
Jiaqing Emperor (r. 1796–1820 CE)
Jiaqing 嘉慶	1796–1820 CE	25 years	Usage continued by the Daoguang Emperor upon his ascension to the throne. Also used by Joseon and the Second Shō dynasty of Ryūkyū Kingdom.
Daoguang Emperor (r. 1820–1850 CE)
Daoguang 道光	1821–1850 CE	30 years	Usage continued by the Xianfeng Emperor upon his ascension to the throne. Also used by Joseon and the Second Shō dynasty of Ryūkyū Kingdom.
Xianfeng Emperor (r. 1850–1861 CE)
Xianfeng 咸豐	1851–1861 CE	11 years	Also used by Joseon and the Second Shō dynasty of Ryūkyū Kingdom.
Tongzhi Emperor (r. 1861–1875 CE)
Tongzhi 同治	1862–1875 CE	14 years	Originally proposed as Qixiang (祺祥). Also used by Joseon and the Second Shō dynasty of Ryūkyū Kingdom.
Guangxu Emperor (r. 1875–1908 CE)
Guangxu 光緒	1875–1908 CE	34 years	Usage continued by the Xuantong Emperor upon his ascension to the throne. Also used by Joseon.
Xuantong Emperor (r. 1908–1912 CE; first reign as Emperor of Qing)
Xuantong 宣統	1909–1912 CE	4 years	Usage later restored during the Manchu Restoration.

=== Wu Zhou ===
Era name	Period of use	Length of use	Remark
Emperor Taizu of Wu Zhou (r. 1678 CE)
Zhaowu 昭武	1678 CE	6 months	
Liyong 利用	Unknown	Unknown	Might not be an era name.
Wu Shifan (r. 1678–1681 CE)
Honghua 洪化	1678–1681 CE	4 years	

=== Taiping Heavenly Kingdom ===
Era name	Period of use	Length of use	Remark
Hong Xiuquan (r. 1851–1864 CE)
Taiping Tianguo 太平天國	1851–1864 CE	14 years	

=== Other regimes contemporaneous with Qing dynasty ===
Era name	Period of use	Length of use	Remark
Qin Shangxing (r. 1644 CE)
Chongxing 重興	1644 CE	1 year	
Liu Shoufen (r. 1644 CE)
Tianding 天定	1644 CE	1 month	
Gong Wencai (r. 1644–1645 CE)
Yongchang 永昌	1644–1645 CE	2 years	Adopted the era name of Li Zicheng.
Hu Shoulong (r. 1645 CE)
Qingguang 清光	1645 CE	1 month	Usage might be in 1646 CE, for a total length of 1 year.
Jiang Erxun (r. 1647 CE)
Zhongxing 中興	1647 CE	1 year	
Wang Guangtai (r. 1647 CE)
Yongli 永曆	1647 CE	1 year	Adopted the era name of the Yongli Emperor.
Zhang Huashan (r. 1647 CE)
Longwu 隆武	1647 CE	1 month	Adopted the era name of the Longwu Emperor.
Sun Kewang
Xingchao 興朝	Unknown	Unknown	
Zhang Jintang (r. 1648 CE)
Tianzheng 天正	1648 CE	1 year	
Xiao Weitang (r. 1661 CE)
Tianshun 天順	1661 CE	1 year	
Wang Yaozu (r. 1665 CE)
Daqing 大慶	1665 CE	1 month	
Yang Qilong (r. 1673–1680 CE)
Guangde 廣德	1673–1680 CE	8 years	
Geng Jingzhong (r. 1674–1676 CE)
Yumin 裕民	1674–1676 CE	3 years	Might not be an era name.
Wei Zhiye (r. 1704 CE)
Wenxing 文興	1704 CE	1 year	
Zhu Liufei, Li Tianji
Yuanxing 元興	Unknown	Unknown	
Qian Baotong (r. 1708 CE)
Yongxing 永興	1708 CE	1 year	
Zhang Nianyi (r. 1708 CE)
Tiande 天德	1708 CE	1 year	
Zhu Yigui (r. 1721 CE)
Yonghe 永和	1721 CE	2 months	
Lin Shuangwen (r. 1786–1788 CE)
Tianyun 天運	1786 CE	1 month	
Shuntian 順天	1787–1788 CE	2 years	
Chen Zhouquan (r. 1795 CE)
Tianyun 天運	1795 CE	1 month	
Li Shu (r. 1797 CE)
Wanli 萬利	1797 CE	1 year	Or Daqing (大慶).
Wang Dashu (r. 1797 CE)
Daqing 大慶	1797 CE	1 month	
Cai Qian (r. 1805–1809 CE)
Guangming 光明	1805–1809 CE	5 years	
Zhu Maoli (r. 1814 CE)
Yanchao 晏朝	1814 CE	1 year	
Zhang Bing (r. 1832–1833 CE)
Tianyun 天運	1832–1833 CE	2 years	
Lin Wanqing (r. 1851 CE)
Tiande 天德	1851 CE	1 year	
Li Mingxian (r. 1853 CE)
Hongshun 洪順	1853 CE	1 month	
Huang Wei (r. 1853 CE)
Tiande 天德	1853 CE	1 year	Also used by other members of the Small Swords Society.
Liu Lichuan (r. 1853–1855 CE)
Tianyun 天運	1853–1855 CE	3 years	Or Daming (大明).
Yang Longxi (r. 1854 CE)
Jianghan 江漢	1854 CE	1 year	Sometimes erroneously referred to as Jianghan (姜漢). Also used by Zhu Mingyue.
Chen Kai (r. 1855–1864 CE)
Hongde 洪德	1855–1864 CE	10 years	
Li Yonghe (r. 1859–1864 CE)
Shuntian 順天	1860–1864 CE	5 years	
Song Jipeng (r. 1860–1863 CE)
Tianzong 天縱	1860–1863 CE	4 years	
Zhu Mingyue (r. 1864–1868 CE)
Sitong 嗣統	1864–1868 CE	5 years	
Huahan 華漢	Unknown	Unknown	
Jianghan 江漢	Unknown	Unknown	Adopted the era name of Yang Longxi.
Tang Jingsong (in office 1895 CE; as President of the Republic of Formosa)
Yongqing 永清	1895 CE	1 month	Usage continued by Liu Yongfu upon his assumption of office.
Huang Guozhen (r. 1897–1898 CE)
Dajing 大靖	1897–1898 CE	2 years	
Aisin Gioro Pujun
Baoqing 保慶	did not use	did not use	The era name Baoqing was originally planned to supersede Guangxu (光緒) in 1900 CE, when the Guangxu Emperor was to abdicate in favor of Aisin Gioro Pujun; this plan did not materialize.
Hong Quanfu (r. 1902 CE)
Damingguo 大明國	1902 CE	1 year	Or Damingshuntianguo (大明順天國).
Gong Chuntai (r. 1906 CE)
Hande 漢德	1906 CE	1 year	
8th Jebtsundamba Khutuktu (r. 1911–1915 CE; first reign)
Gongdai 共戴	1911–1915 CE	5 years	Usage later restored in 1921 CE.

== Republic of China ==
Current Calendar	Period of use	Length of use	Remark
Republic of China (r. 1912–present CE)
Minguo 民國	1912–present	Current calendar	Used alongside the Gōnglì 公历 (Gregorian calendar) since 1912

The Republic of China officially uses the Republic of China calendar. While not an era name, the Republic of China calendar is based on the era name system of Imperial China. The Republic of China calendar was the official calendar of mainland China between 1912 CE and 1949 CE, and has been in official use in Taiwan since 1945 CE.

=== Other regimes contemporaneous with Republic of China ===
Era name	Period of use	Length of use	Remark
Hongxian Emperor (r. 1915–1916 CE)
Hongxian 洪憲	1916 CE	92 days	
Chadu Ruoba (r. 1917 CE)
Tongzhi 通治	1917 CE	1 year	Sometimes erroneously referred to as Tongzhi (通志).
Xuantong Emperor (r. 1917 CE; second reign as Emperor of Qing)
Xuantong 宣統	1917 CE	12 days	Restored the era name of 1909 CE.
8th Jebtsundamba Khutuktu (r. 1921–1924 CE; second reign)
Gongdai 共戴	1921–1924 CE	4 years	Restored the era name of 1911 CE.
Aisin Gioro Puyi (in office 1932–1934 CE; as Chief Executive of Manchukuo)
Datong 大同	1932–1934 CE	3 years	
Kangde Emperor (r. 1934–1945 CE; as Emperor of Manchukuo)
Kangde 康德	1934–1945 CE	12 years	

== Unknown era names ==
This is a list of individuals who proclaimed era names, but the exact era names are not known.

Era name	Monarch	Period of use	Length of use
Era names not known	Ma Mian	144–145 CE	5 months
Era names not known	Song Jian	Late 180s–214 CE	Over 30 years
Era names not known	Ma Ru	497–501 CE	5 years
Era names not known	Li Chenghong	763 CE	3 months
Era names not known	Da Qianhuang	858–871 CE	14 years
Era names not known	Da Xuanxi	872–893 CE	22 years
Era names not known	Da Weixie	894–906 CE	13 years
Era names not known	Da Yinzhuan	907–926 CE	20 years

== See also ==
- Chinese calendar
- Republic of China calendar
- Chinese era name
- Japanese era name
- Korean era name
- Vietnamese era name
- North Korean calendar
- Regnal year
