= Gengxin =

Gengxin may refer to:

- Gengxing (更興), a Chinese era name (530–532 CE)
- Gengxin Township (更新乡), Tian'e County, Hechi, Guangxi Zhuang Autonomous Region, China
- Gengxin Township (更新乡), Fuyu County, Songyuan, Jilin province, China
- Lin Gengxin (born 1988), a Chinese actor
- Thomas Tien Ken-sin (1890–1967), a Chinese Cardinal of the Catholic Church
