= Tae Hyŏnsŏk =

13th King of Balhae (r. 871–894)

- Hangul: 대현석
- Hanja: 大玄錫
- RR: Dae Hyeonseok
- MR: Tae Hyŏnsŏk

Tae Hyŏnsŏk (died 894) was the 13th king of Balhae who reigned from 871 to 894. Tae Kŏnhwang was his grandfather. During his reign, he sent tribute to tang dynasty china three times. His son was Tae Wihae.

== See also ==
- List of Korean monarchs
- History of Korea

Tae Hyŏnsŏk House of Tae Died: 894
Regnal titles
Preceded by Tae Kŏnhwang	King of Balhae; 871–894	Succeeded by Tae Wihae
