= Sŏn of Balhae =

10th King of Balhae (r. 818–830)

Sŏn

Chinese name
- Chinese: 宣王
Transcriptions
Standard Mandarin
- Hanyu Pinyin: Xuānwáng
- Wade–Giles: Hsüanwang

Birth name in Chinese
- Chinese: 大仁秀
Transcriptions
Standard Mandarin
- Hanyu Pinyin: Dà Rénxiù
- Wade–Giles: Ta Jên-hsiu

Korean name
- Hangul: 선왕
- Hanja: 宣王
Transcriptions
- Revised Romanization: Seon wang
- McCune–Reischauer: Sŏn wang

Birth name in Korean
- Hangul: 대인수
- Hanja: 大仁秀
Transcriptions
- Revised Romanization: Dae Insu
- McCune–Reischauer: Tae Insu

King Sŏn (Korean: 선왕; Hanja: 宣王; r. 818–830), also called Tae Insu (대인수; 大仁秀), was the 10th king of the kingdom of Balhae. He restored national strength, and is remembered today as the last of the great Balhae rulers before its fall.

== Background ==
Tae Insu was a 4th-generation descendant of Tae Choyŏng's younger brother, Tae Yabal. In spite being from the collateral branch, he succeeded to the throne during the years of 817 and 818. He reestablished royal authority, and strengthened the military tremendously.

== Reign ==
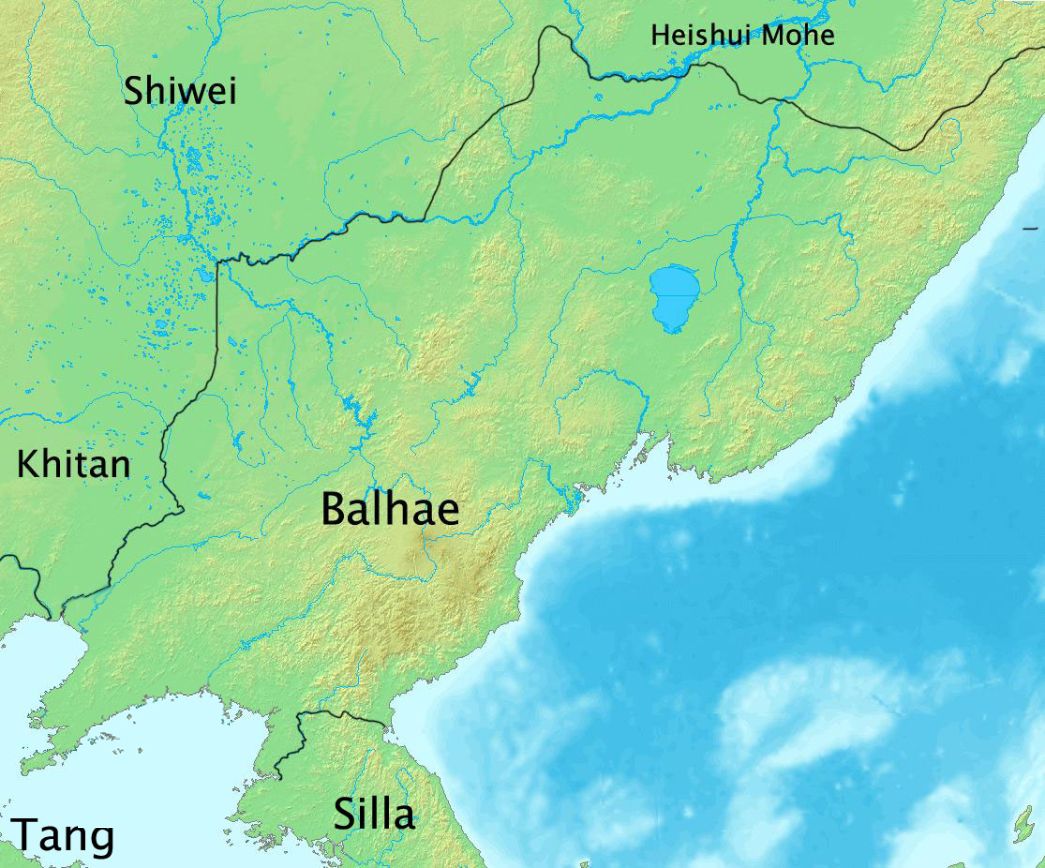
The territory of Balhae in 830, during the reign of king Seon of Balhae.

King Seon concentrated heavily on the empire's territorial expansion, and led campaigns that resulted in the absorption of many northern Malgal tribes including Heishui Mohe. Southwest Little Goguryeo in Liaodong was absorbed into Balhae, and also he ordered southward expansion towards Silla.

During his 12-year reign, he dispatched embassies five times to Japan, which was aimed at establishing diplomatic relations as well as increasing trade between the two kingdoms. Balhae emissaries were treated favorably even though Japan wanted Balhae to restrict the size of the embassies due to the costs associated with hosting them. The trade routes established across the Sea of Japan led to Balhae becoming one of Japan's most important trading partners.

He died in 830 and his grandson Tae Ijin succeeded to the throne.

== See also ==
- List of Korean monarchs
- History of Korea
- List of Administrative divisions of Balhae

Sŏn of Balhae House of Tae Died: 830
Regnal titles
Preceded by Kan	King of Balhae; 818–830	Succeeded by Tae Ijin
