= Tae Ijin =

11th King of Balhae (r. 830–857)

Chinese name
- Chinese: 大彝震
Transcriptions
Standard Mandarin
- Hanyu Pinyin: Dà Yizhèn
- Wade–Giles: Ta Ichên

Korean name
- Hangul: 대이진
- Hanja: 大彝震
Transcriptions
- Revised Romanization: Dae Ijin
- McCune–Reischauer: Tae Ijin

Tae Ijin (Korean: 대이진; Hanja: 大彝震; r. 830–857) was the 11th king of the Balhae kingdom, which existed from AD 698 to 926 and occupied parts of Manchuria and northern Korea. The era name of his reign was Hamhwa (咸和, 함화).

He was preceded by his grandfather, Seon of Balhae. The king made efforts for the consolidation of a centralized administrative system and organized a standing army.

== See also ==
- List of Korean monarchs
- History of Korea

Tae Ijin House of Tae Died: 857
Regnal titles
Preceded by Seon	King of Balhae; 830–857	Succeeded by Tae Kŏnhwang
