= Tae Kŏnhwang =

12th King of Balhae (r. 857–871)

- Hangul: 대건황; 대처황
- Hanja: 大虔晃; 大處晃
- RR: Dae Geonhwang; Dae Cheohwang
- MR: Tae Kŏnhwang; Tae Ch'ŏhwang

Tae Kŏnhwang (Korean: 대건황; Hanja: 大虔晃; r. 857–871) was the 12th king of Balhae. He was the younger brother of Tae Ijin, his predecessor on the throne.

Because none of Balhae's own records have survived, we know little of Geonhwang except that he sent a few missions to Japan and Tang China.

== See also ==
- List of Korean monarchs
- History of Korea

Tae Kŏnhwang House of Tae Died: 871
Regnal titles
Preceded by Tae Ijin	King of Balhae; 857–871	Succeeded by Tae Hyŏnsŏk
