= Zhang Bing =

Zhang Bing may refer to:

- Bing Zhang (Chinese: 张冰), Chinese astrophysicist
- Zhang Bing (sports shooter) (Chinese: 张冰), Chinese sports shooter
