= Zhu Benli =

Alleged final emperor of Southern Ming Dynasty

Dingwu Emperor 定武帝
- Reign: 1646–1663
Era name and dates
- Dingwu (定武): 1646–1663
- House: Zhu
- Dynasty: Southern Ming

Zhu Benli (simplified Chinese: 朱本𫟷; traditional Chinese: 朱本鉝; pinyin: Zhū Běnlì) or the Dingwu Emperor (定武帝) is claimed to be the last emperor of the Southern Ming dynasty. He inherited the title Prince of Han (韓王) in 1611. His identity and existence, however, are a matter of some dispute, and Zhu Youlang, the Yongli Emperor, is generally taken to be the last emperor of the Southern Ming dynasty.

In 1646, Zhu Benli took the title of Dingwu Emperor and ruled in parallel with the Yongli Emperor. He got along well with the Yongli Emperor and agreed that it was better to fight the occupying Qing dynasty than to fight amongst themselves. Zhu Benli had his seat in Hubei, where he built a fortification. In 1663, Hubei was conquered by the Qing dynasty, and the fate of Zhu Benli is unknown.

Zhu Benli had relatively little influence on politics during the Southern Ming dynasty.

== See also ==
- List of emperors of the Ming dynasty
