= Tae Wihae =

14th King of Balhae (r. 894–906)

- Hangul: 대위해
- Hanja: 大瑋瑎
- RR: Dae Wihae
- MR: Tae Wihae

Tae Wihae (died 906) (reigned 894–906) was the 14th king of the 7th–10th century Balhae kingdom, which encompassed modern day Korea and some southern parts of northeast China.

Little is known of Tae Wihae, and some lists of Balhae monarchs do not include him, though his name does appear in the Chinese chronicle Tang Huiyao (唐會要). His temple name and era name are unknown.

It was not until 1940 that Tae Wihae's existence was confirmed, when Jin Yufu and other Chinese historians verified his name for the first time.

Though few records exist, it is thought that Tae Wihae made progress in diplomatic fields, having sent delegates, Baejeong (裵頲) to Japan, and osodo (烏炤度) to Tang dynasty China, in 894 and 905 respectively. He had a son named Tae Pongye.

== See also ==
- List of Korean monarchs
- History of Korea

Tae Wihae House of Tae Died: 906
Regnal titles
Preceded by Tae Hyŏnsŏk	King of Balhae; 894–906	Succeeded by Tae Insŏn
