= Zheng clan of Xingyang =

Notable Chinese family

Zheng 鄭
- Clan
- Origin: Xingyang county
- Founded: Western Han (c. 100s BC)
- Founder: Zheng Dangshi (direct male descendant of Duke Zhuang of Zheng)
- Titles: Various
- Dissolution: Five Dynasties and Ten Kingdoms period (c. 900s AD)

The Zheng clan of Xingyang (simplified Chinese: 荥阳郑氏; traditional Chinese: 滎陽鄭氏) was a prominent Chinese clan, chiefly based around Xingyang county (modern day Kaifeng, Henan). Tracing their origins to the rulers of the State of Zheng, they became highly prominent in government during the Northern and Southern dynasties, where they became one of the "Four Clans" in Northern Wei, and also during the Tang dynasty.

== History ==
The Zheng clan of Xingyang's surname originated from the State of Zheng. State of Zheng was fall to the State of Han in 375 BC. The clan was first established in Xingyang county by Zheng Dangshi, son of Zheng Jun, a general who served under Xiang Yu.

=== Northern and Southern dynasties ===
The Zheng clan first became prominent in the Northern and Southern dynasties period as officials in Northern Wei, beginning with Zheng Xi (426–492). Throughout the period, they engaged in intermarriage with other major clans, as well as with the ruling Tuoba clan.

Alongside the Cui clan of Boling, the Lu clan of Fanyang and the Wang clan of Taiyuan, the Zhengs were one of the "Four Surnames" of Northern Wei.

== Prominent members ==
- Zheng Congdang (d. 887), Tang chancellor
- Zheng Lang (d. 857), Tang chancellor
- Zheng Yuqing (746–820), Tang chancellor
- Zheng Xunyu (738–805), Tang chancellor
- Zheng Tan (d. 842), Tang chancellor
- Zheng Yanchang (d. 894), Tang chancellor
- Zheng Tian (825–883), Tang chancellor and military commander who defeated Huang Chao
- Lady Zheng, the Princess of Lanling
