= Lady Zheng =

Princess Consort Zheng 鄭氏
- Spouse: Gao Changgong, Prince of Lanling
- House: Zheng clan of Xingyang (by birth); Northern Qi royal family (by marriage)
- Religion: Buddhism

Princess Consort Zheng (Chinese: 鄭氏; pinyin: Zhèng Shì) was a noblewoman of the Northern Qi dynasty. She was the principal wife and princess consort (王妃) of Gao Changgong, the Prince of Lanling. She came from the Zheng clan of Xingyang, a well-known political family in northern China. Her personal name is not recorded in historical texts. She is mentioned in the Book of Northern Qi during the account of her husband's death in 573.

== Historical background ==
Little is known about Consort Zheng's family or early life. She belonged to the Zheng clan of Xingyang (滎陽鄭氏), one of the leading families of the Northern Dynasties. The ruling Gao family also had marriages with other large families of the time, including the Wang and Lu clans. During the Northern Qi dynasty, the ruling Gao family had both Xianbei and Han Chinese roots. They often married members of powerful Han Chinese families, including the Zheng clan of Xingyang, the Wang clan of Taiyuan, and the Lu clan of Fanyang. These marriages helped the Gao family gain political support. As Gao Changgong's wife, Zheng held the title of Princess Consort of Lanling (蘭陵王妃).

== Execution of Gao Changgong ==
In 573, Emperor Gao Wei ordered Gao Changgong to be killed. Gao Changgong had won several battles, but the emperor had grown suspicious of him. In the fifth month of that year, Gao Wei sent Xu Zhifan (徐之範) to give him poison.

Before drinking it, Gao Changgong spoke to his wife. He asked, "I have served the emperor loyally. What have I done to deserve this poison?" (我忠以事上，何辜於天，而遭鴆也)

Consort Zheng told him, "Why not ask to see the emperor?" (何不求見天顏)

Gao Changgong answered, "How could I see him?" (天顏何由可見)

He then drank the poison and died. Their exchange is recorded in Volume 11 of the Book of Northern Qi.

== Later life ==
After Gao Changgong's death, Consort Zheng gave her necklace of beads as an offering to the Buddha. Gao Xiaoheng, the Prince of Guangning and Gao Changgong's elder brother, sent someone to buy it back for her. Gao Yanzong, the Prince of Ande and another of Gao Changgong's brothers, wrote a letter of protest. The Book of Northern Qi says that the letter was wet with his tears.

The Book of Northern Qi gives no further account of her life. A later report says that she became a Buddhist nun after her husband's death, but it does not give the date or place.

== In popular culture ==
The 2013 television series Prince of Lanling tells a fictional love story between Gao Changgong and Yang Xuewu (楊雪舞), played by Ariel Lin. In the series, the Empress Dowager gives Yang Xuewu the surname Zheng before her marriage. She then becomes Consort Zheng, matching the surname found in the historical record.

The 2016 television series Princess of Lanling King is based on the novel Lanling Huangfei (蘭陵皇妃) by Yang Qianzi. Its main character is Duanmu Lian (端木怜), also known as Yuan Qingsuo (元清鎖), played by Zhang Hanyun. The story follows her relationship with Gao Changgong and Yuwen Yong, the emperor of Northern Zhou. It uses a fictional story rather than the life of the historical Consort Zheng.

== See also ==
- Gao Changgong
- Book of Northern Qi
- Zheng clan of Xingyang
