= Prince of Lanling =

Prince of Lanling may refer to:

- Gao Changgong (541–573), Northern Qi general
- Zhang Zhongwu (died 849), Tang dynasty general
- Prince of Lan Ling (TV series), 2013 Chinese TV series, based on Gao Changgong's life
