= Tomb of Xu Xianxiu =

Cemetery in China

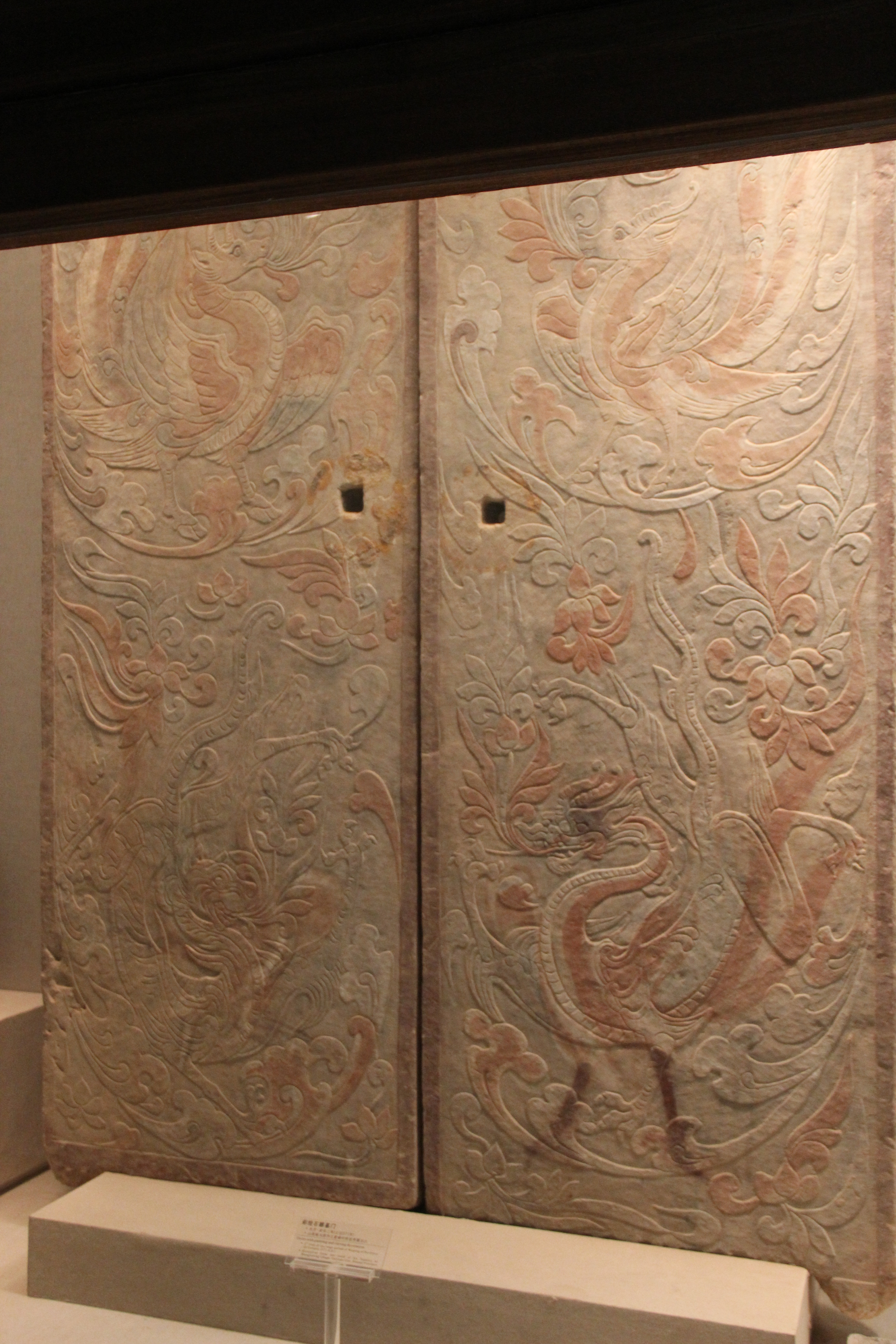
- Panels from the tomb of Xu Xianxu, 571 CE
- Created: 571 CE (Northern Qi)

Location

The Tomb of Xu Xianxiu (Chinese: 徐显秀墓; pinyin: Xú Xiǎnxiù mù) is located in Wangjiafeng village, Haofeng Township, Yingze District, Shanxi Province, China. It is the tomb of the Northern Qi Prince of Wu’an, and the head of the imperial armies, Xu Xianxiu (502 - 16 February 571). The tomb, noted for its murals, was excavated during 2001–2003.

== Excavation and description of tomb ==
The tumulus-style tomb projects 5.2 meters above ground and is easily visible. A fifteen-meter-long passageway begins south of the tomb at ground level and slopes down to the tomb entrance. The tomb chamber, which has a vaulted ceiling, is approximately 6.5 square meters and is made of grey stone. On December 1, 2000, local villagers reported that the tomb had been looted. Working together, the staffs of the Shanxi Archaeological Department and the Taiyuan City Archaeological Department entered the tomb and took photographs. Based on these photographs, the tomb was determined to be from the Northern Qi period.

The official excavation began in 2001. The entrance to the tomb was originally carved with a blue dragon and a white tiger, but later a bird was painted over it. The tomb murals reflect the exchange and integration of the various cultures during the Northern and Southern Dynasties as well as being a vivid reflection of social life at that time.The murals were in poor condition. The paintings were deteriorating and needed to be stabilized; this was done by using syringes and carefully injecting adhesive to bind the pigments to the tomb wall. Furthermore, there were many plant roots which had damaged the paintings and needed to be removed. Although the tomb had been plundered at least five times, there were 550 burial items discovered within the tomb.

== Murals ==
Murals cover more than 300 square meters of the tomb. To prepare the walls for the paintings, they were first coated with white plaster on which the artist outlined the design and filled it in with color. The murals begin immediately upon entering the passageway. Going down, towards the coffin chamber, both walls alongside the path are covered with paintings. They begin with images that are now damaged but were probably mythical birds followed by an honor guard, and then, closest to the chamber, are groups of men leading riderless horses. On either side of the entranceway, doormen stand solemnly holding whips. All four walls and ceiling of the tomb chamber are painted. The north wall, directly opposite the entrance, shows the deceased and his wife on a canopied funerary couch, presiding over a feast and surrounded by musicians playing Central Asian instruments. On the western wall, the mural depicts a tacked-up riderless horse under a canopy, preceded by an honor guard. The focus of the eastern wall is an oxen-pulled chariot under a canopy. Like the western wall, an honor guard also precedes the chariot. The south wall shows the honor guard. The clothes of the people in the murals are typical of the Xianbei people of that time.

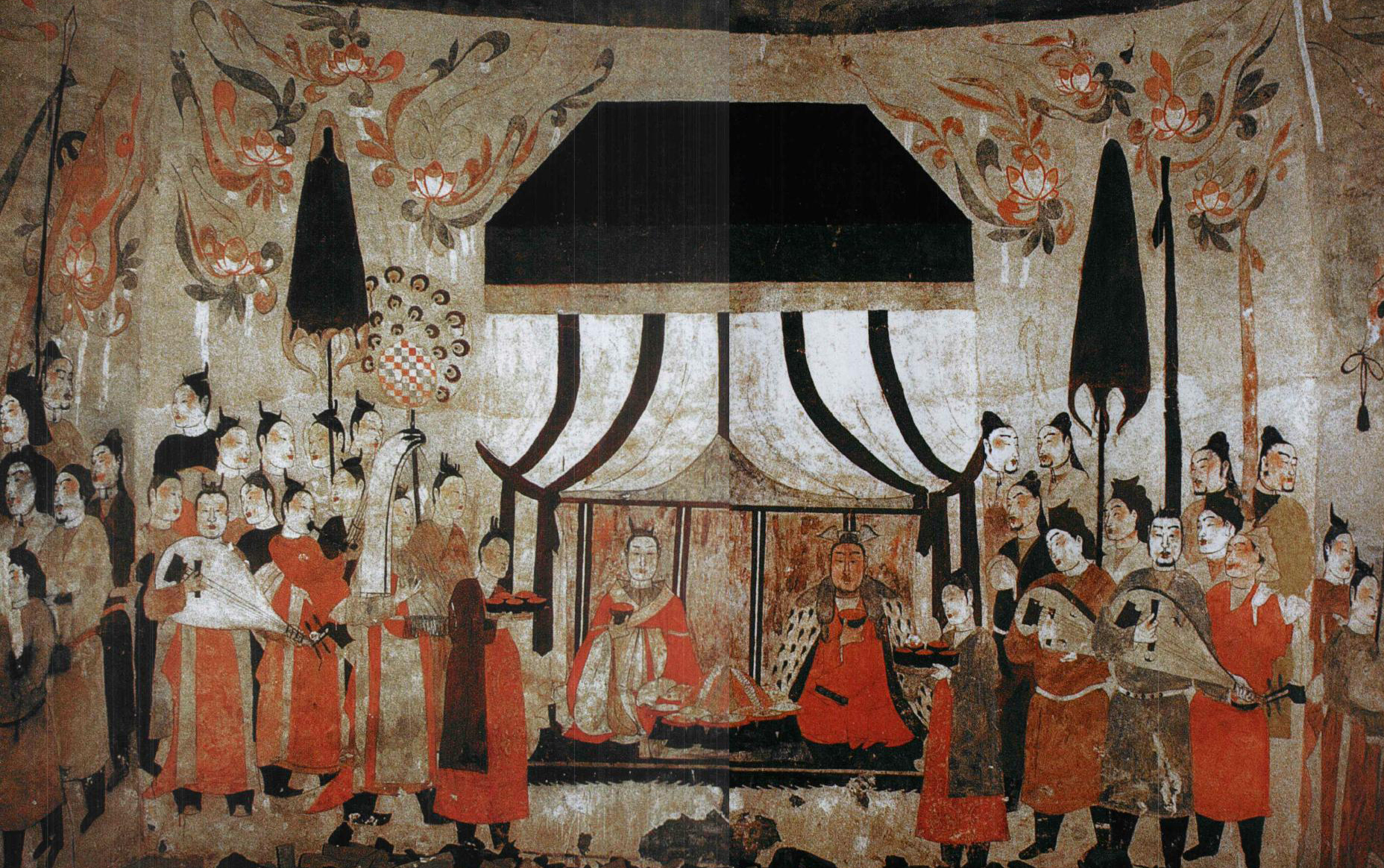
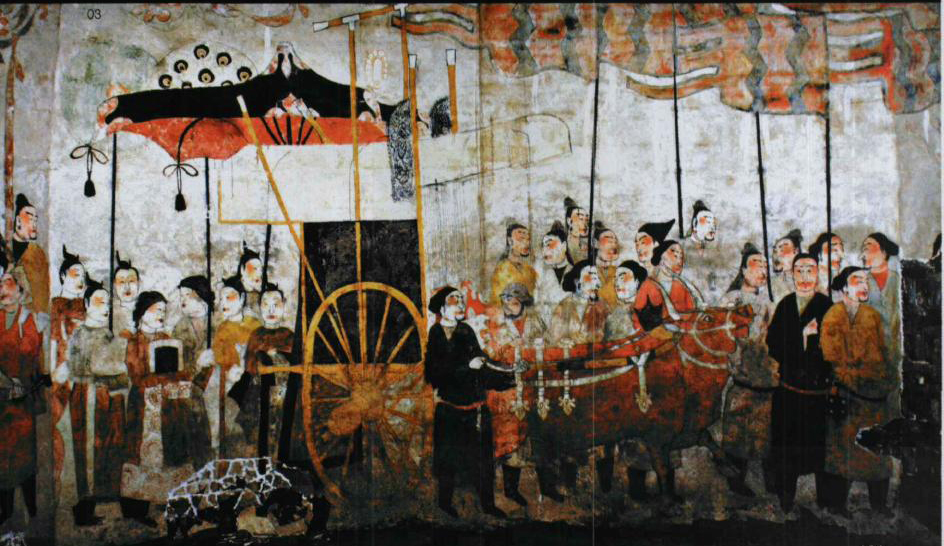
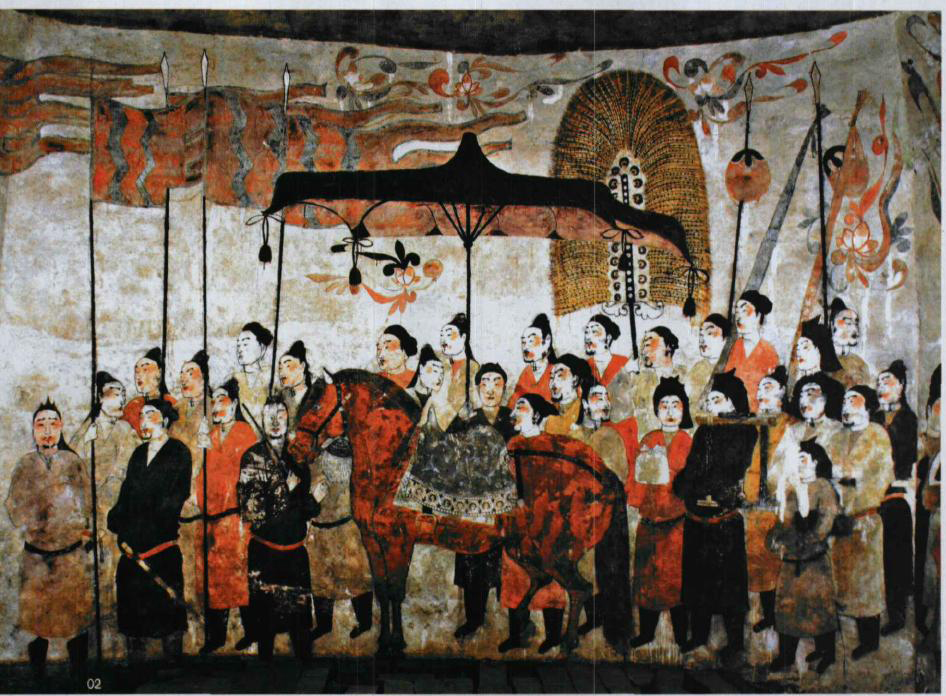
Mural paintings of court life in the tomb of Xu Xianxiu, Northern Qi Dynasty, 571 AD, located in Taiyuan, Shanxi province.

== Looting and grave artifacts ==
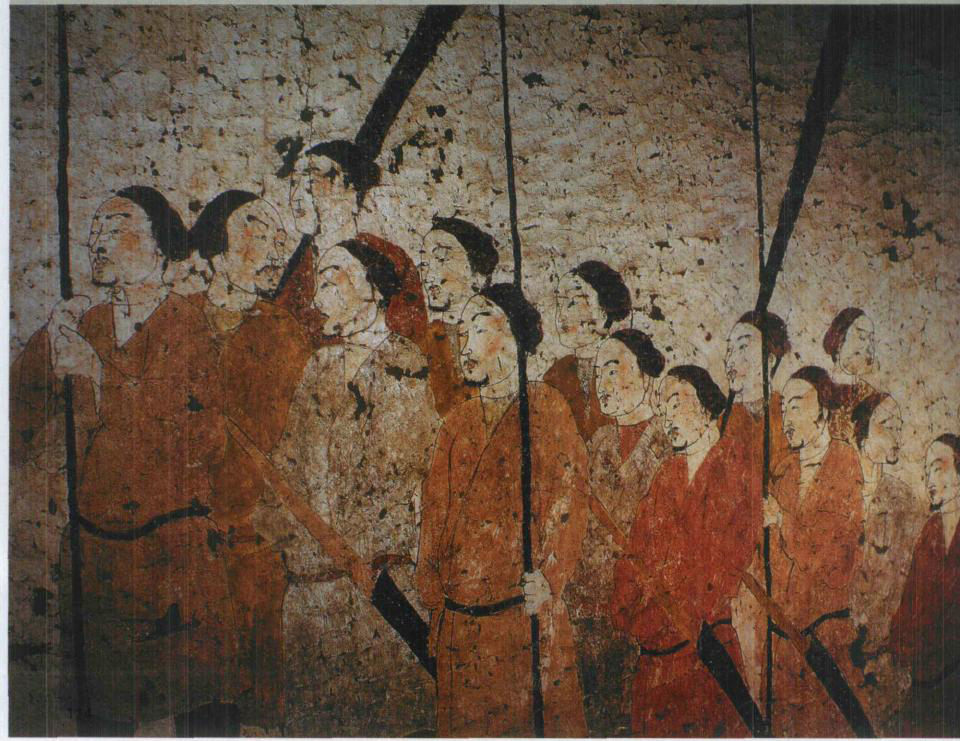
Paintings in Xu Xianxiu Tomb

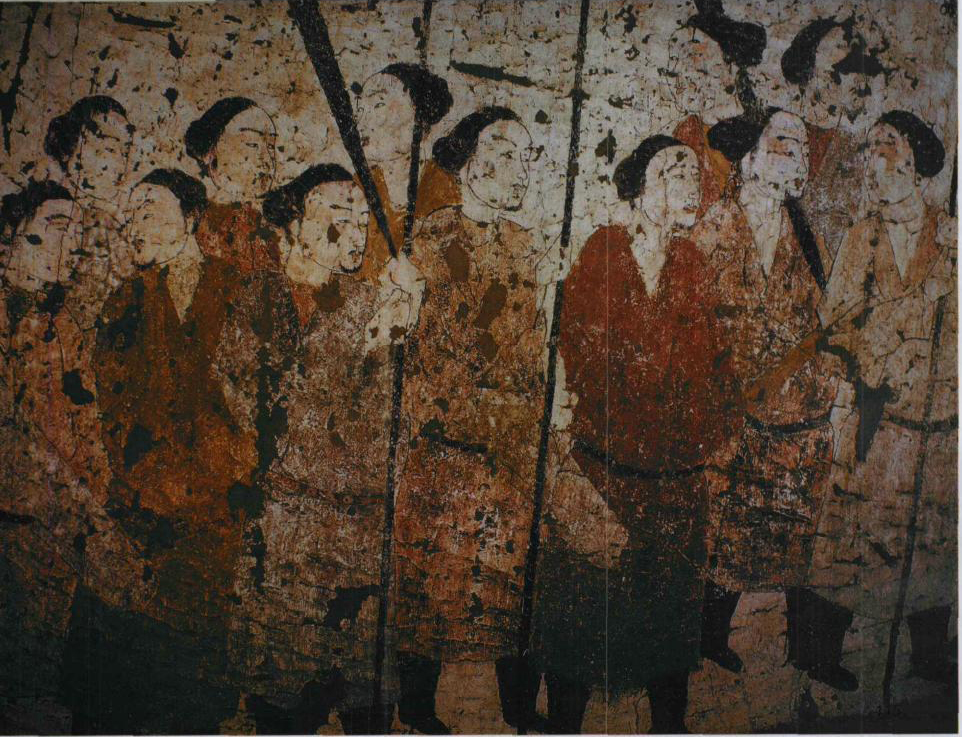
Paintings in Xu Xianxiu Tomb

Archaeologists discovered five looters' tunnels. The numerous times that the tomb had been previously looted explain the fact that many of the burial goods were seriously damaged. The archaeologists found more than 200 pieces of porcelain and more than 320 ceramic figurines. A West Asian or Mediterranean-style gold ring mounted with a tourmaline was found among the remains of the coffin. The semi-precious stone was carved with an enigmatic figure variously identified as being a Greek or a Sogdian deity.

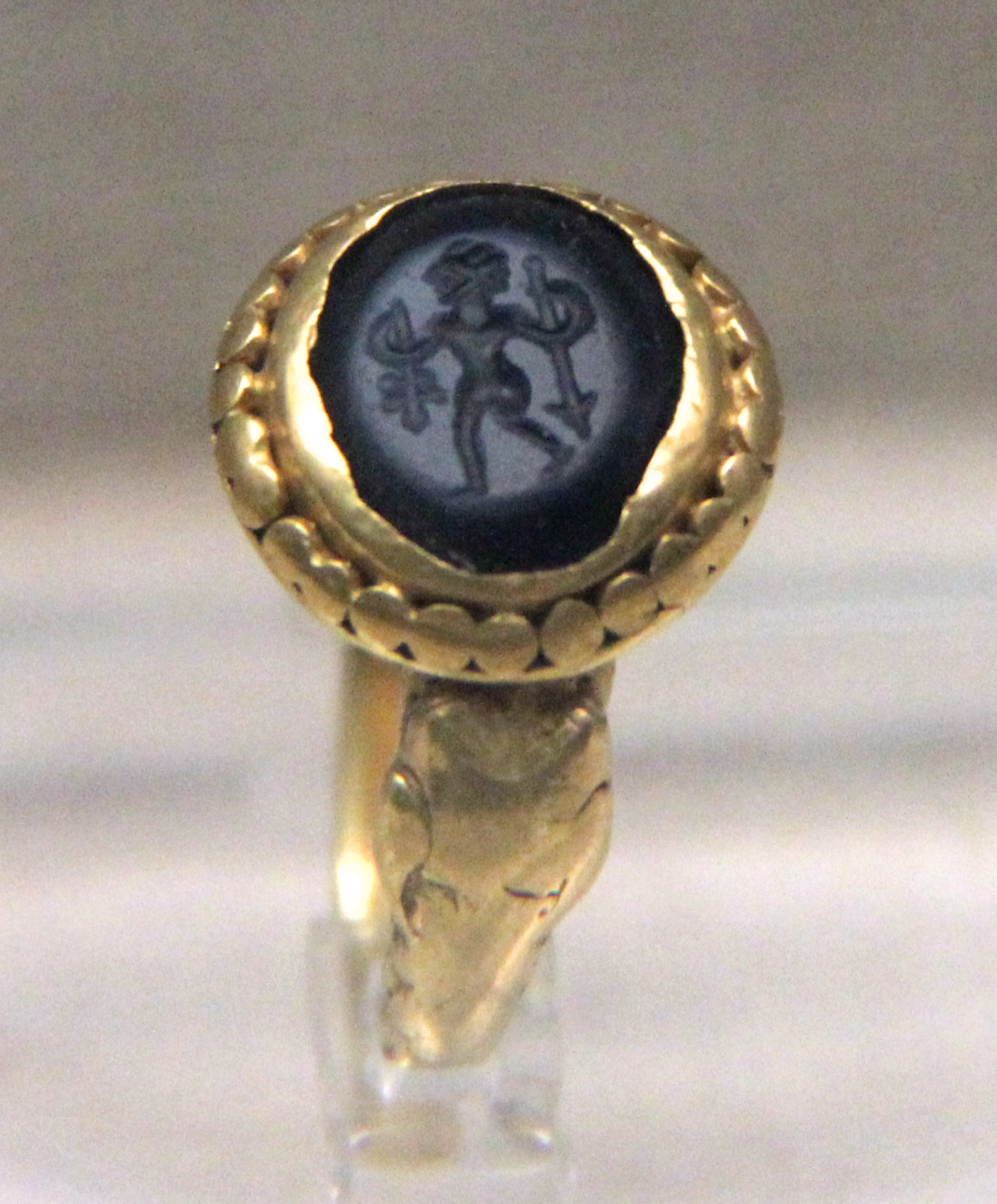
Gem-inlaid gold ring, tomb of Xu Xianxiu.

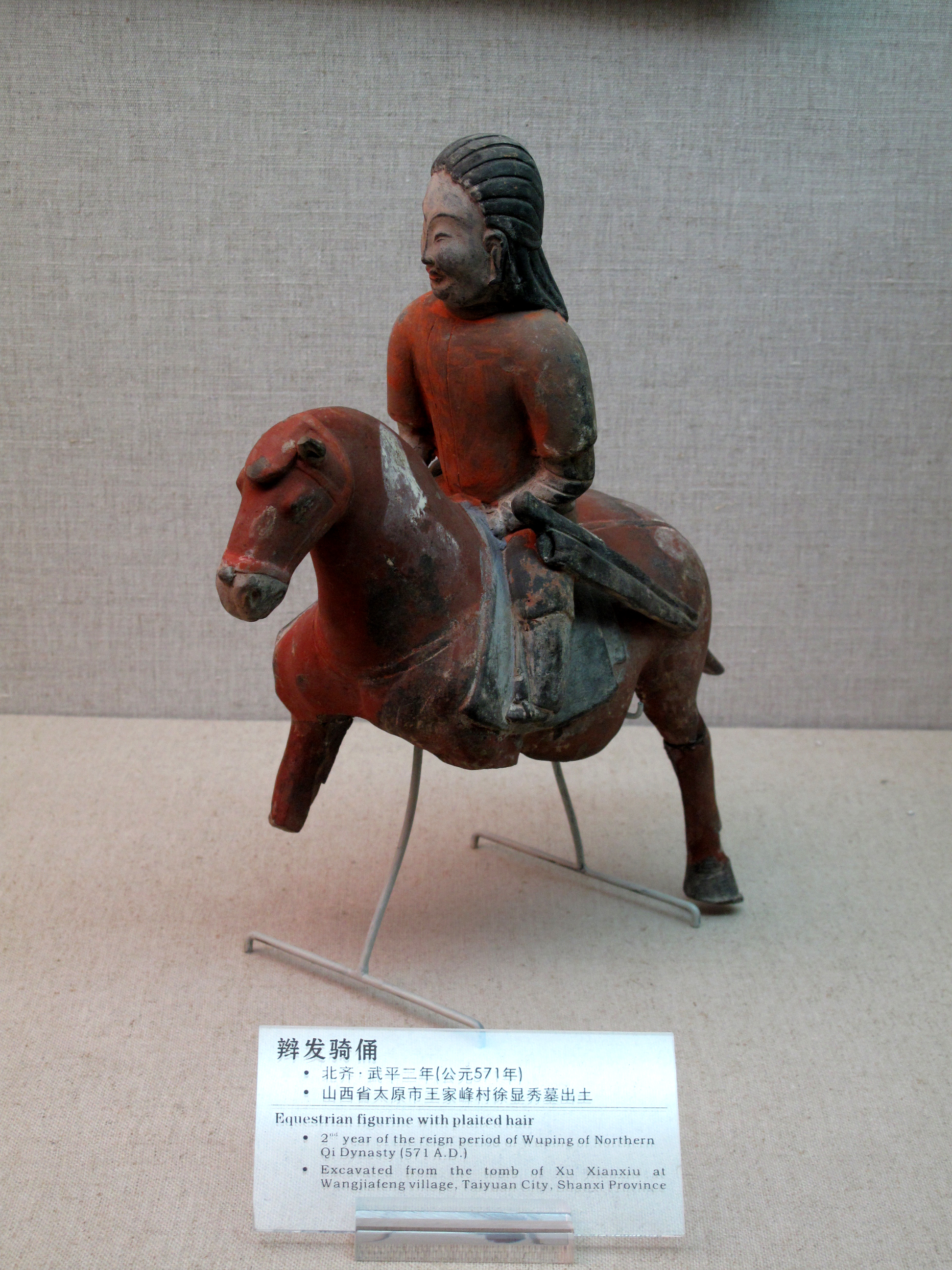
Terracotta figurine, tomb of Xu Xianxu

Although a scattering of bones was found in the tomb, no complete skeletons were found. This may be on account of Zoroastrian sky burial customs.
