= Zheng Yanchang =

Zheng Yanchang (鄭延昌), courtesy name Guangyuan (光遠), was an official of the Chinese Tang dynasty, who served as a chancellor during the reign of Emperor Zhaozong in the 9th century.

== Background ==
It is not known when Zheng Yanchang was born. His family was part of the Zheng clan known as the "Northern Ancestor" branch and traced its line from the ruling house of the Spring and Autumn period state Zheng; its ancestors also included officials of Han dynasty, Cao Wei, Jin dynasty (266–420), Later Zhao, Former Yan and/or Later Yan, Northern Wei, Northern Zhou, and Tang dynasty. Of Zheng Yanchang's closer relatives was his third cousin Zheng Congdang, who was a chancellor during the reign of Emperor Xizong. (Zheng Congdang's grandfather Zheng Yuqing was a chancellor during the reign of Emperor Xizong's great-great-grandfather Emperor Dezong.) However, Zheng Yanchang's own immediate ancestors did not appear to be particularly prominent—as his great-grandfather Zheng Shen (鄭申) was a county sheriff and his grandfather Zheng Zezhi (鄭則之) was an imperial guard officer, although his father Zheng Yi (鄭猗) was a prefectural prefect. He had at least one older brother, Zheng Yunsheng (鄭允升), and one younger brother, Zheng Yanji (鄭延濟).

Zheng Yanchang passed the imperial examinations late in the Jinshi (進士) class late in the Xiantong era (861–874) of Emperor Xizong's father Emperor Yizong. He later became an imperial censor with the title Jiancha Yushi (監察御史).

== Service under Zheng Tian and subsequent career ==
When the former chancellor Zheng Tian (not related to Zheng Yanchang) became the military governor (jiedushi) of Fengxiang Circuit (鳳翔, headquartered in modern Baoji, Shaanxi) during the reign of Emperor Xizong, probably in 879, he invited Zheng Yanchang to serve on his staff. After the major agrarian rebel Huang Chao attacked the imperial capital Chang'an in 880, forcing Emperor Xizong to flee to Chengdu, Emperor Xizong left Zheng Tian in command of the remaining Tang forces in the capital region. Zheng Tian put Zheng Yanchang in charge of the logistics of supplying the soldiers with food, as well as issuing orders to the armies to comfort them.

After Zheng Tian later joined Emperor Xizong's administration-in-flight at Chengdu as chancellor again, in 882, Zheng Tian had Zheng Yanchang made Sixun Yuanwailang (司勛員外郎), a low-level official at the ministry of civil service affairs (吏部, Libu), as well as an imperial scholar (翰林學士, Hanlin Xueshi). Later (it is unclear whether Zheng Tian was still chancellor by this point), Zheng Yanchang was made the deputy minister of defense (兵部侍郎, Bingbu Shilang), the mayor of Jingzhao Municipality (京兆, i.e., the Chang'an region), and the acting director of finances (判度支, Pan Duzhi).

== Chancellorship and after chancellorship ==
In 892, by which time Emperor Xizong had died and been succeeded by his brother Emperor Zhaozong, Zheng Yanchang, who was then the minister of census (戶部尚書, Hubu Shangshu), was made Zhongshu Shilang (中書侍郎), the deputy head of the legislative bureau of government (中書省, Zhongshu Sheng), and a chancellor with the designation Tong Zhongshu Menxia Pingzhangshi (同中書門下平章事). He was then also made the minister of justice (刑部尚書, Xingbu Shangshu). His service as chancellor was said to be undistinguished. In 893, when the warlord Li Maozhen the military governor of Fengxiang tried to foster protests at Chang'an against Emperor Zhaozong's planned campaign against him, the protest crowd surrounded Zheng and fellow chancellor Cui Zhaowei on one occasion and attacked them, forcing them to take refuge in people's houses.

In 894, Zheng was removed from his chancellorship and made You Pushe (右僕射), one of the heads of the executive bureau (尚書省, Shangshu Sheng), as he was ill. He subsequently died—with his biography in the New Book of Tang implying that the death was shortly after his removal, but giving no dates.

== Notes and references ==
- New Book of Tang, vol. 182.
- Zizhi Tongjian, vol. 259.
