= Zheng Congdang =

Tang Chinese official

Zheng Congdang (鄭從讜) (died 887?), courtesy name Zhengqiu (正求), was an official of the Chinese Tang dynasty, serving as a chancellor twice during the reign of Emperor Xizong.

== Background and early career ==
It is not known when Zheng Congdang was born. His family claimed ancestry from the ruling house of the Spring and Autumn period state Zheng, and his grandfather Zheng Yuqing served as a chancellor during the reigns of Emperor Dezong and Emperor Dezong's grandson Emperor Xianzong. Zheng Congdang's father Zheng Guan (鄭澣) was himself a long-time imperial official, although he was never chancellor, dying while serving as the military governor (Jiedushi) of Shannan West Circuit (山南西道, headquartered in modern Hanzhong, Shaanxi) in 839 at the age of 63. Zheng Congdang had three older brothers, Zheng Yunmo (鄭允謨), Zheng Maoxiu (鄭茂休), and Zheng Chuhui (鄭處誨), each of whom served in the imperial government as well. (A third cousin, Zheng Yanchang, would be a future chancellor.)

Zheng Congdang himself passed the imperial examinations in the Jinshi class in 842, during the reign of Emperor Xianzong's grandson Emperor Wuzong. He started as his governmental career as a copyeditor (校書郎) at the Palace Library, and thereafter served as an advisory official, and then a supervisory official at the executive bureau of government (尚書省, Shangshu Sheng), eventually becoming responsible for drafting edicts. As the chancellors Linghu Tao and Wei Fu both passed the imperial examinations while Zheng Guan oversaw the imperial examinations, they both felt indebted to Zheng Congdang and thus enhanced Zheng Congdang's reputation. As a result, Zheng was subsequently promoted to Zhongshu Sheren (中書舍人), a mid-level official at the legislative bureau (中書省, Zhongshu Sheng).

== During Emperor Yizong's reign ==
In 862, by which time Emperor Wuzong's cousin Emperor Yizong was emperor, Zheng Congdang was made deputy minister of rites (禮部侍郎, Lǐbu Shilang) and put in charge of the imperial examinations. He was later made deputy minister of justice (刑部侍郎, Xingbu Shilang) and then deputy minister of civil service affairs (吏部侍郎, Lìbu Shilang, note different tone). It was said that he selected appropriate officials while overseeing the civil service, but that, as a result of refusing to bow to powerful individuals' wishes, was sent out of the capital to serve as the military governor of Hedong Circuit (河東, headquartered in modern Taiyuan, Shanxi) as well as the mayor of its capital Taiyuan Municipality. After he served there for a year, he requested a return to the capital, but the request was not accepted; rather, he was transferred to Xuanwu Circuit (宣武, headquartered in modern Kaifeng, Henan) to serve as its military governor and the prefect of its capital Bian Prefecture (汴州). He was said to have governed Xuanwu well, causing the powerful individuals at that time to be apprehensive that he would be promoted. He was thus transferred to Lingnan East Circuit (嶺南東道, headquartered in modern Guangzhou, Guangdong) to serve as its military governor and the prefect of its capital Guang Prefecture (廣州). While at Guang Prefecture, he had to dealt with many incursions and non-Han rebellions with few troops available to him and no reinforcements from the north, but he managed the situation by commissioning non-Han tribal chiefs to deal with the military matters. It was said that despite the large number of rebellions, Guang Prefecture was safe.

== During Emperor Xizong's reign ==
=== Prior to first chancellorship ===
Emperor Yizong died in 873 and was succeeded by his young son Emperor Xizong. Zheng Congdang, who did not want to remain in Lingnan East longer, submitted repeated petitions, offering even to accept an honorary position at the eastern capital Luoyang. Emperor Xizong then recalled him to Chang'an to serve as minister of justice (刑部尚書, Xingbu Shangshu). In 878, when Zheng was referred to at the minister of civil service affairs (吏部尚書, Lìbu Shangshu), he was made Zhongshu Shilang (中書侍郎), the deputy head of the legislative bureau, and given the designation Tong Zhongshu Menxia Pingzhangshi (同中書門下平章事), making him a chancellor de facto.

=== First chancellorship ===
Not much was recorded about Zheng Congdang's acts as chancellor in his first term. At this time, Hedong Circuit had been plagued by repeated mutinies, as well as the danger of being attacked by Shatuo rebels led by the chieftain Li Guochang and Li Guochang's son Li Keyong. After a mutiny in 880 led to the death of the military governor Kang Chuangui (康傳圭), the imperial government decided that it would take someone as senior as a chancellor to deal with the situation, so Zheng was commissioned as the military governor of Hedong and allowed to select his own staff members. Zheng thus invited many well-known individuals to serve on his staff, and his staff was described as a miniature imperial government. He retained the Tong Zhongshu Menxia Pingzhangshi title as an honorary title.

=== Between the chancellorships ===
Back at Hedong, Zheng Congdang was described as apparently mild in disposition, but was full of strategies and decisive. He was able to discover mutiny plots well, and he executed those who planned mutinies, while comforting the rest. For example, the officer Zhang Yanqiu (張彥球), who was forced by his colleagues to participate in the mutiny that killed Kang Chuangui, was someone that Zheng comforted and entrusted with military commands.

In late 880, with Chang'an under the threat of attack by the major agrarian rebel Huang Chao, Zheng was ordered to transfer his soldiers to Zhuge Shuang and Zhu Mei and have Zhuge and Zhu head south to try to help defend the capital, although the capital fell apparently before Zhuge and Zhu could actually do so. Huang took the throne as the emperor of a new state of Qi, but Zheng, along with other Tang generals, continued resisting. Meanwhile, in 881, Li Keyong, claiming that he was coming to the imperial government's aid, requested that Zheng allow him transit through Hedong. Zheng did not refuse, but declined to supply his troops (besides giving Li Keyong a small amount of food) and prepared for a siege of Taiyuan, causing Li Keyong to respond by pillaging Hedong Circuit. Zheng sought aid from Qibi Zhang (契苾璋) the military governor of Zhenwu Circuit (振武, headquartered in modern Hohhot, Inner Mongolia); Qibi came to his aid with ethnic Tujue and Tuyuhun troops, and Li Keyong withdrew north, capturing Xin (忻州, in modern Xinzhou, Shanxi) and Dai (代州, also in modern Xinzhou) Prefectures.

In 882, Qibi Zhang received imperial permission (from Emperor Xizong, who was then at Chengdu) to attack Li Keyong, and Emperor Xizong further ordered Zheng to assist Qibi. However, by winter 882, the eunuch monitor of the armies against Huang, Yang Fuguang, had convinced the imperial government that it was necessary to enlist the Shatuo to defeat Huang. The chancellor in charge of the operations against Huang, Wang Duo, thus issued an edict in Emperor Xizong's name pardoning and summoning Li Keyong to the imperial cause, and further ordering Zheng not to interfere. Still, as Li Keyong was leading his troops south, he instructed his troops to avoid Taiyuan, but personally went to Taiyuan to greet Zheng. Zheng gave him a gift of horses and treasures. Li Keyong then continued south to join the imperial cause against Huang.

After the Tang forces recaptured Chang'an in spring 883—a battle in which Li Keyong's contribution was instrumental—Li Keyong returned to Dai Prefecture briefly, but soon, Emperor Xizong issued an edict to reward Li Keyong by making him the military governor of Hedong, while summoning Zheng to Emperor Xizong's presence. Zheng accepted the edict and yielded Hedong to Li Keyong. Zheng was then made Sikong (司空), one of the Three Excellencies, as well as Menxia Shilang (門下侍郎), the deputy head of the examination bureau (門下省, Menxia Sheng), as well as chancellor again with the designation Tong Zhongshu Menxia Pingzhangshi.

=== Second chancellorship and death ===
Not much was recorded about Zheng Congdang's acts as chancellor in his second term. In 886, he was given the greater chancellor title of Shizhong (侍中, i.e., the head of the examination bureau), as well as Taifu (太傅). In 887, he offered to retire, and he was made a senior advisor to the Crown Prince—an entirely honorary title since there was no crown prince at the time. He died soon thereafter. He was given the posthumous name Wenzhong (文忠, "civil and faithful").

== Notes and references ==
- Old Book of Tang, vol. 158.
- New Book of Tang, vol. 165.
- Zizhi Tongjian, vols. 253, 254, 255, 256.
