= Gao Changgong =

- Prince of Lanling
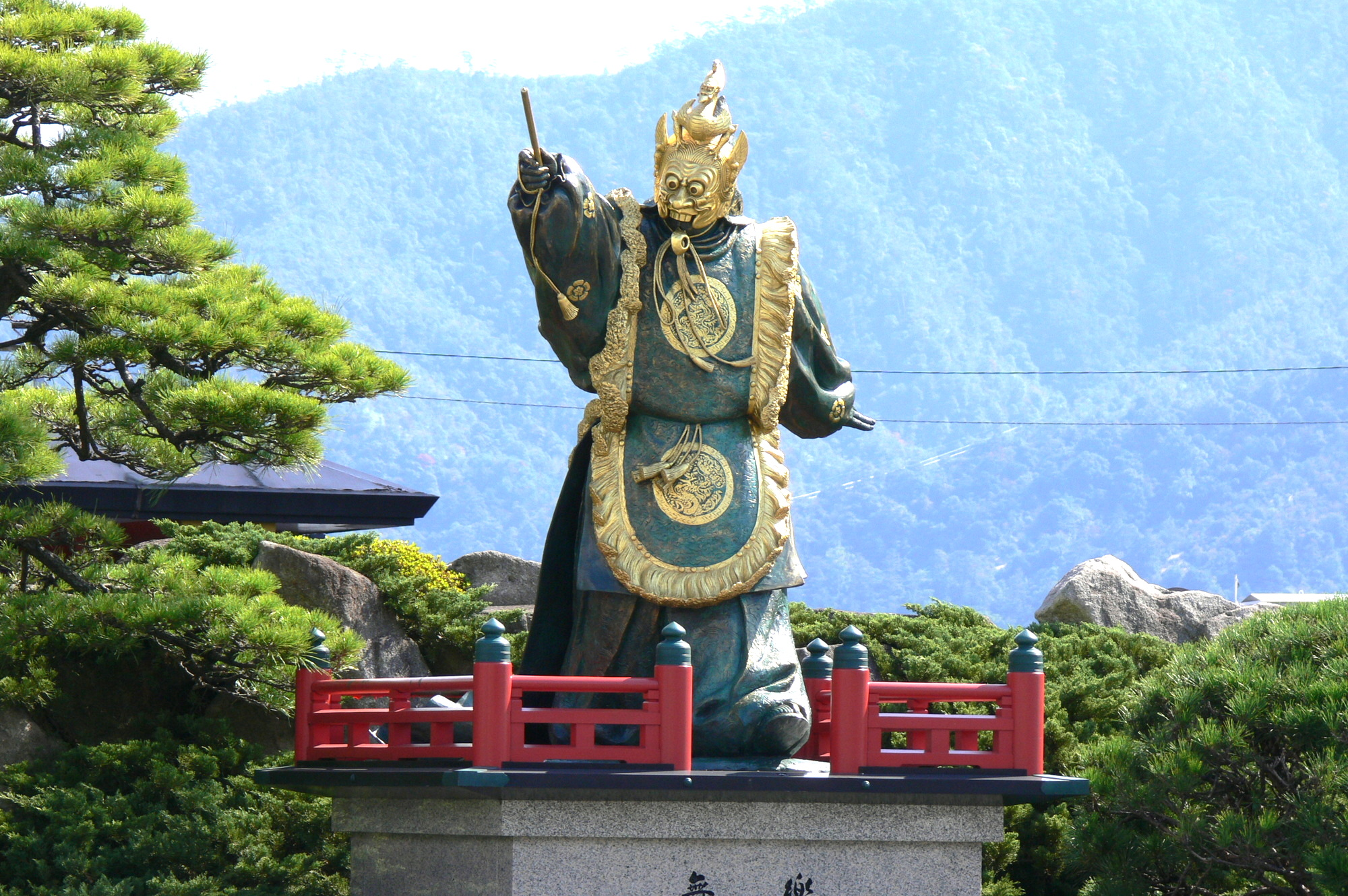
- Prince of Lanling outside Miyajimaguchi Station towards the ferry for Itsukushima Shrine
- Died: June or July 573
- Spouse: Lady Zheng
Names
- Family name: Gāo (高); Given name: Sù (肅) or Xiaoguan (孝瓘); Courtesy name: Changgong (長恭); Posthumous name: Prince Zhongwu of Lanling (蘭陵忠武王)
- Father: Gao Cheng

Gao Changgong (541? – June or July 573) (Chinese: 高長恭; pinyin: Gāo Chánggōng; Wade–Giles: Kao^{1} Chang^{2}-kung^{1}), born Gao Su (Chinese: 高肅; pinyin: Gāo Sù; Wade–Giles: Kao^{1} Su^{4}), alternatively named Gao Xiaoguan (Chinese: 高孝瓘; pinyin: Gāo Xiàogüán; Wade–Giles: Kao^{1} Hsiao^{4}-chüan^{2}), courtesy name Changgong, posthumous name Prince Zhongwu of Lanling (蘭陵忠武王), was an imperial prince, official and high-ranking general of China's Northern Qi dynasty. He was given a fiefdom in Lanling County, southern Shandong, hence he is also popularly known by his noble title as the Prince of Lanling (蘭陵王). Gao Changgong was the grandson of Gao Huan and the fourth son of Gao Cheng. According to the Book of Northern Qi and the Record of the Court Entertainment Bureau, Gao Changgong had a beautiful face and feminine physical appearance. Thus, he always wore a terrible mask when he fought in battles.

== Biography ==
Gao Changgong was born the fourth son of Gao Cheng, elder brother of the first emperor of Northern Qi and therefore a prince of Northern Qi. He was given the title of Prince of Lanling on 1 May 560. Gao Changgong was also made a general by Emperor Wucheng of Northern Qi (Gao Zhan), his uncle, and his distinction in battles as well as personal kindness and bravery led him becoming widely loved and admired. Legend has it that he looked beautiful like a woman, so he wore a mask in battles to appear more fearsome to the enemy.

Gao Changgong repelled the First Turkic Khaganate when they attacked Jinyang (晉陽, now the city of Taiyuan). His most famous battle however was the rescue of the siege of Jinyong (金墉, near modern Luoyang) in 564 A.D. Gao Changgong led only 500 cavalrymen and fought through an army of Northern Zhou, which was attacking the city with 100,000 soldiers. He fought his way to the gates the city, surprising the defenders. The soldiers of Jinyong did not recognize him, so he took off his helmet and mask. The soldiers in the city rejoiced at his arrival and were refilled with courage. They opened the gates and joined the battle outside the city. Soon the army of Northern Zhou was defeated.

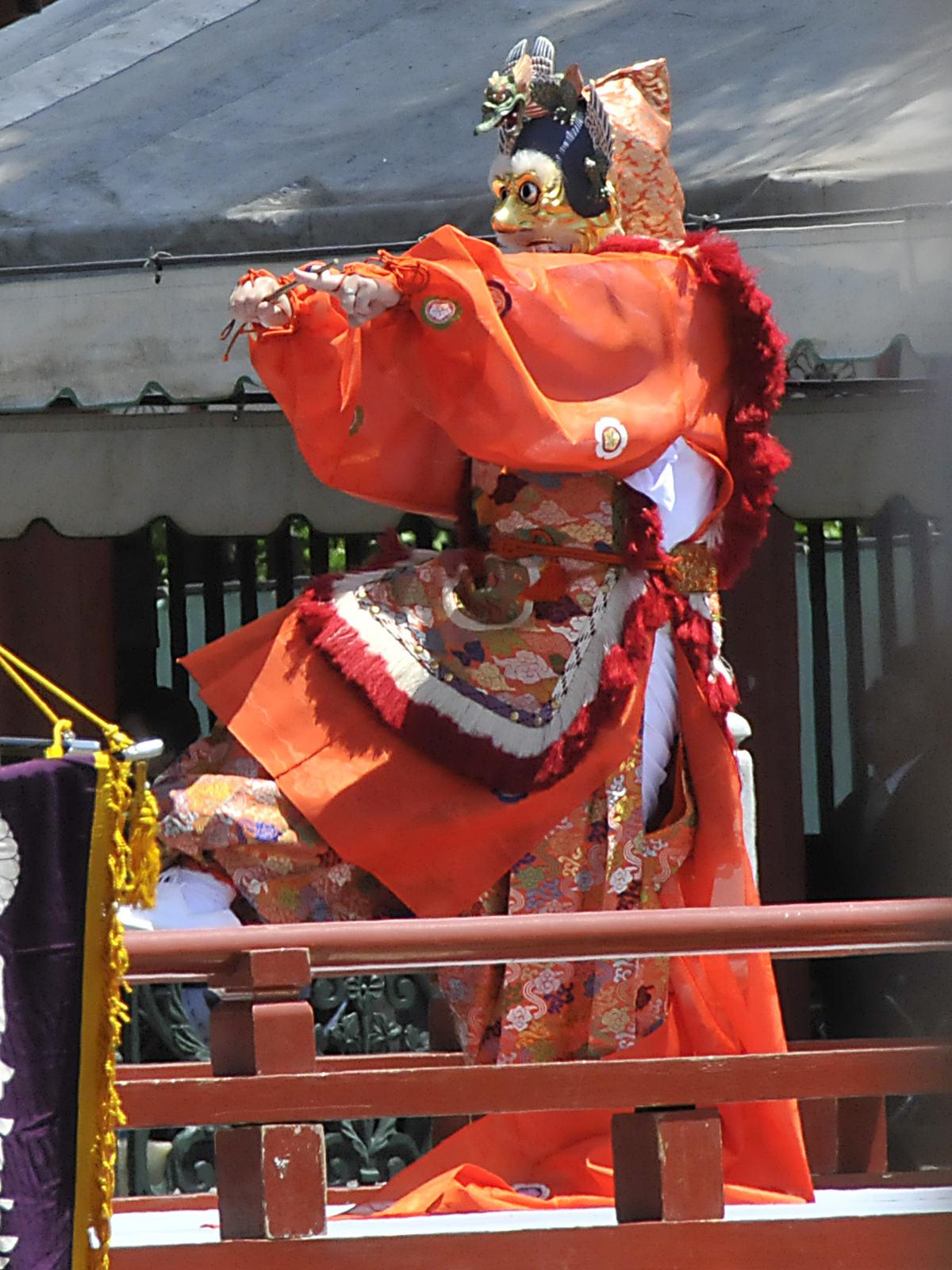
The performance of the masked dance The Prince of Lanling (蘭陵王) in Japan.

In order to celebrate the victory, the soldiers composed the famous song and dance "The song of the Prince of Lanling entering the battle camp” (蘭陵王入陣曲, also known as 大面, "The great mask"). According to the Record of the Court Entertainment Bureau (教坊記) of Tang dynasty, the dance "Great mask" was one of the courts musics to be performed with the emperor's audience.

The song and the dance are long lost in China; however, it was introduced into Japan during the Tang dynasty with Lanling known as Ranryōō (蘭陵王 (らんりょうおう), Ran-ryō-ō), and is still being performed in some ceremonies today.

After the death of Gao Zhan, Gao Changgong's cousin Gao Wei ascended the throne. Gao Changong's reputation, competence and influence over the army upset the young emperor. Gao Wei asked Gao Changgong about the battle at Jinyong: "You penetrated too deeply into the formation; if you had suffered a military reverse, it would be too late to regret such an action." Gao Changgong replied: "I am responsible for our family affairs, I did it without considering the consequences." The emperor, hearing the reference to "family affairs" became suspicious. He was afraid that Gao Changgong might overthrow him. Many members of the Gao family had met their ends at the hands of brothers and cousins, and he became paranoid that he would have the same fate.

To avoid the emperor's suspicion and jealousy, Gao Changgong often pretended to be sick, staying away from wars and politics. No matter how low a profile he kept, the emperor still sent him a cup of poisonous wine one day in June or July 573 A.D. Gao Changgong drank the wine and ended his life, probably in his early 30s.

Four years after Gao Changgong's death, having lost one of its greatest generals, Northern Qi was destroyed by Northern Zhou. All the members of the Gao royal family were slaughtered.

In 1999, within the cave of Longmen, a message was found carved into a statue, indicating that the Prince of Lanling had living descendants.

== Popular culture ==
Gao Changgong is one of the 32 historical figures who appear as special characters in the video game Romance of the Three Kingdoms XI by Koei. His story is also dramatized in the 2013 television series Prince of Lan Ling and 2016 television series Princess of Lanling.

Gao Changgong appears as a character in Fate/Grand Order as "Prince of Lan Ling" and is voiced by Mori Nanako. He also makes an appearance in the popular mobile game Legend of the Phoenix as a confidant and a partner, and in the mobile MOBA game Honor of Kings (using his noble title in the Chinese version, and using the name "Gao Changgong" in the global version) with assassin and jungler roles.

In "Ranryō-Ō" (蘭陵王, Prince Ranryō), the final story written by Japanese novelist Yukio Mishima, members of the Tatenokai ("Shield Society") gather at the barracks after an exhausting day of training to listen to one of their ranks play a rendition of "Ranryō-Ō" on the yokobue.
