= Prince of Lan Ling (TV series) =

- promo poster
- Also known as
- Traditional Chinese: 蘭陵王
- Simplified Chinese: 兰陵王
- Hanyu Pinyin: Lán Líng Wáng
- Genre: Historical; War; Romance
- Written by: Wu Dawei; Huang Rourou; Chen Xiaohao; Meng Zhi
- Directed by: Chung Shukai; Zhou Xiaopeng
- Starring: Feng Shaofeng; Ariel Lin; Daniel Chan
- Opening theme: Into the Array Song by Mayday
- Ending theme: Heart of Palms by Della Ding
- Countries of origin: China; Taiwan
- Original language: Mandarin
- No. of seasons: 1
- No. of episodes: 46

Production
- Executive producer: Luō Gang
- Producers: Ren Zhonglun; Yang Dengkui; Yang Zili; Zhang Xiaowu
- Production location: China
- Running time: 45 mins
- Production companies: SFG Emperor Culture Development Co., Ltd. Polyface Entertainment Media Co., Ltd. Beijing Dongwang Media Co., Ltd; Shanghai Youhug Media Co.Ltd.

Original release
- Network: Jiangsu Television (JSTV)
- Release: 14 August – 30 August 2013

Related
- The Majesty of Wolf

Prince of Lan Ling (Chinese: 兰陵王) is a 2013 Chinese television series that is set during the lifetime of the Northern Qi Dynasty prince Gao Changgong. It starred Chinese actor Feng Shaofeng as the titular Prince of Lan Ling, alongside Taiwanese actress singer Ariel Lin and Hong Kong actor singer Daniel Chan.

Principal photography began on 16 April and finished on 10 August 2012 in Mainland China. Filming locations include Hengdian World Studios, Xiangshan Movie & Television Town in Zhejiang Province and Tianmo Natural Desert in Huailai County Hebei Province. The series began airing in China on 4 channels (Zhejiang TV, Dragon TV, Shenzhen TV, Yunnan TV) simultaneously on 14 August 2013. The series was also aired in Taiwan, Hong Kong, Japan, Korea, Thailand and other Asia-Pacific countries.

== Synopsis ==
The Prince of Lan Ling is one of the four most handsome men in ancient Chinese history. Known as the God of War, he led his army into battle and vanquished his foes while wearing a fearsome mask to hide his face. His real name was Gao Changgong, a famed general during the Northern Qi period who is wise and loyal, and treats his soldiers with great generosity and respect.

A prophecy foretold that victory would go to the one who has the priestess's blessing. Yang Xuewu, the last priestess of her clan, unwittingly becomes embroiled in a war between Northern Qi and Northern Zhou. Although she foresees a tragic fate for the Prince of Lan Ling, the military general of Northern Qi, she falls in love with him and helps him win the war against Yuwen Yong, the Emperor of Northern Zhou. However, her attempts only bring him closer to his fate. As his standing among his people grows, so does the murderous jealousy in Crown prince’s heart. Can she protect him when it’s his family who wants him dead?

== Cast ==
=== Main ===
- Feng Shaofeng as Gao Changgong, Prince of Lan Ling
  - Crowned with the title “Beautiful God of War”, the Prince of Lan Ling is an undefeatable and strong general, who possesses both strength and intelligence. As a prince of royal blood, he treats everyone equally, regardless of their rank and background. He fights battles, seeing them each as a step towards world peace. Being a kindhearted man, he chooses to wear a demonic mask whenever he goes on a war, and under the mask, he becomes a cruel and heartless general who soars to bring victory to his kingdom. Upon seeing his mother’s fate of not being able to be with the man that she loves, he vows to marry and love only one woman in his lifetime, not wanting his wife to share the same misery as his mother.
- Ariel Lin as Yang Xuewu (voiced by Nana Mizuki in Japanese dub)
  - Jiang Yiyi as young Yang Xuewu
  - The last descendant of the legendary line of female seers known as the Heavenly Maiden. A cheerful, intelligent and kind-hearted girl. She is naive and trusting, and often willing to step out bravely and protect what she think is right. Even with her limited medical knowledge, she is able to cure many illnesses and this, coupled with her intelligence, people unanimously acknowledged her as the Heavenly Maiden.
- Daniel Chan as Yuwen Yong, Emperor Wu of Northern Zhou (voiced by Hiroki Takahashi in Japanese dub)
  - A natural ruler with good looks, wisdom, perception and strength, he is also a ruthless emperor who does not tolerate betrayal. Having to survive in the Palace to protect his throne, he learnt to protect himself and to never reveal his weakness to anyone. He is kind to his servants and loving to his niece, Zhen Er. He views the Prince of Lan Ling as an honourable rival and strikes up a peace treaty between the two states. Unfortunately, only one of them can survive to be the ruler of the North.

=== Supporting ===
==== Northern Qi ====
- George Hu as Gao Yanzong, Prince of An De
  - Prince of Lan Ling’s beloved younger half brother; he is also his capable assistant. Entering the palace with the same circumstance as his elder brother, he is very dependent on and loyal to his brother. A flirtatious man who is good with ladies, he also helped match-make his brother and Xue Wu. Eventually, he marries and settles down with Xue Wu's servant, Xiao Cui.
- Zhai Tianlin as Gao Wei, Emperor of Northern Qi
  - Born as the Crown Prince of the Kingdom of Qi, people have high expectations of him, including his father who treated him strictly since young; resulting in him feeling belittled and underappreciated. He is kindhearted in nature, but seeing that he is surpassed by his cousin, the Prince of Lan Ling, he becomes bitter and feels the need to prove himself to everyone. This causes him to becomes a multi-faceted and cruel man due to his jealousy taking over. He is often reckless when making important decisions, and resorts to every means in order to get to the throne, including murdering his father. He has been in love with Zheng Er since he was young, but Zheng Er abuses his love to exact revenge on the Prince of Lan Ling and Xue Wu.
- Nikita Mao as Zheng Er/ Feng Xiaolian
  - A palace maid of the previous Empress of Qi, who fell in love with the Prince of Lan Ling at first sight. She is later tricked by the Empress and Zu Ting and becomes a slave for participating in a conspiracy of which she was unaware of. She eventually escapes the slave camp, only to arrive at Lan Ling Manor in time to find out that Xue Wu was to marry the Prince. This causes her to be filled with jealousy and hatred, and she resorts to all means to destroy Xue Wu's reputation. Eventually, the Prince finds out about her trickery and banishes her. She then takes on the identity of Feng Xiaolian and becomes the current Empress of Qi, an extremely scheming woman who manipulates the Emperor of Qi (Gao Wei) to take revenge.
- Shawn Wei as Han Xiaodong
  - Protector of Xue Wu who is extremely loyal and caring towards her. Originally a poor boy from Beggars' Village, he tricks Xue Wu and sells her to a slave trader. However, after she escapes and sees the terrible conditions that made it necessary for him to commit crimes to gain money, she forgives him and helps the Village recover. Since then, Xiao Dong has been working at Lan Ling Manor. He is secretly in love with Xue Wu, but remains silent.
- He Zhonghua as Gao Zhan, Emperor Wucheng of Northern Qi
  - Fourth Emperor of Northern Qi Dynasty. Gao Wei's father, the Prince of Lan Ling and Prince An De's uncle. He was killed by his son Gao Wei.
- Dai Chunrong as Empress Hu
  - Gao Zhan's wife and Gao Wei's biological mother. She will do anything to make sure her son Gao Wei ascends to the throne.
- Li Donghan as Yang Shishen
  - Northern Qi General. A trusted friend and subordinate to the Prince of Lan Ling, who played a crucial role in many battles.
- He Qiang as Duan Shao
  - Prince of Lan Ling's trusted mentor, who personally brought him to the palace at age 6.
- Zhang Guoqing as Zu Ting
  - Northern Qi official and Gao Wei's trusted advisor. He causes tension between the Prince of Lan Ling and Gao Wei by instilling jealousy in Gao Wei. He planned to betray Northern Qi empire by poisoning Yuwen Yong and controlling him, but he was later killed by Prince of Lan Ling.
- Lu Yong as Hulu Guang
  - Great Northern Qi general. He was Killed by Gao Wei for his honest comments towards him.
- Wang Tianye as Hulu Xu Da
  - Northern Qi general, son of Hulu Guang. He is a trusted friend to the Prince of Lan Ling since young. He was captured and tortured by the Northern Zhou army, and died.
- Deng Sha as Prince of Lan Ling's birth mother
- Zhu Haijun as Xiao Cui
  - Prince of Lan Ling's house maid and loyal servant. She is one of the first to notice Zheng Er's suspicious behaviour and protects Xue Wu. She stays with Prince An De after all his concubines leave him.

==== Northern Zhou ====
- Wang Di as Empress Ashina
  - A wise and knowledgeable woman who is able to aid her husband to acquire and become the ruler of the North. She is married to Yuwen Yong politically, but loves him deeply.
- Zheng Xiaoning as Yuwen Hu
  - Northern Zhou's Chief Minister, Yuwen Yong´s uncle. His cruel ambitions for power and the throne leads him to kill Yuwen Yong's brothers.
- Wang Zheng as Yuwen Shenju
  - Yuwen Yong's trusted subordinate.
- Zhao Yi as Yuchi Jiong
  - Northern Zhou general, loyal subordinate of Yuwen Yong. Ambitious and unscrupulous, his main goal is to defeat his enemies. Yuwen Yong was forced to kill him after the Chief Minister Yuwen Hu shames him for losing a battle against the Prince of Lan Ling.
- Zhang Zimu as Yuwen Zhen
  - Yuwen Yong's niece. She is a sickly child. Yuwen Yong is very protective of her since her father was killed by his uncle Yuwen Hu.
- Zong Fengyan as Yuwen Yu
  - Northern Zhou's previous Emperor. Yuwen Yong's half brother and Yuwen Zhen's father. He was poisoned to death by Yuwen Hu.

==== Others ====
- Lü Zhong as Yang Linshi
  - Xue Wu's grandmother. She is very protective of Xue Wu since they are the last of their tribe. She predicted the prophecy of the Prince of Lan Ling's tragic fate.
- Huang Xindi as Yu Tu
  - Yuwen Yong's spy against Yuwen Hu.

== Soundtrack ==
No.	Title	Singer(s)	Length
1.	"Heart of Palms" (手掌心)	Della Ding	4:18
2.	" Into the Array Song" (入陣曲)	Mayday	3:29
3.	"Crazy Existence" (瘋狂的存在)	Richie Ren	4:18
4.	"Fate" (命運)	JiaJia	3:50
5.	"Suddenly I Am Touched" (突然心動)	Daniel Chan	5:40
6.	"Who Obtains the Heavenly Maiden, Obtains the World" (得天女者得天下)	Instrumental	3:58
7.	"An Inch of Time, An Inch of Heart" (一寸光陰一寸心)	Instrumental	3:33
8.	"Can’t Return To The Day We First Met" (回不去初識那天)	Instrumental	3:06
9.	"The Truth Beneath The Mask" (假面真情)	Instrumental	3:29
10.	"Thorough Daybreak" (一乾二淨的黎明)	Instrumental	3:04
11.	" As Seen By Man And Heaven, Obeying The Will Of Heaven" (天人可見，不違天意)	Instrumental	3:08
12.	"The Night Is Not Over, Battlefield Of Survivors" (夜未央，倖存的沙場)	Instrumental	2:59
13.	"Loving One Person in a Lifetime" (一生只愛一人)	Instrumental	3:18

== Ratings ==
Zhejiang TV ratings
date	Episode	National Net	Ratings share	Rank	CSM46	Ratings share	Rank
8.14	1-3	0.37	1.14	6	0.727	2.00	3
8.15	4-6	0.57	1.75	4	0.876	2.44	2
8.16	7-8	0.57	1.78	4	1.118	3.13	2
8.17	9-10	0.57	1.78	4	0.877	2.53	2
8.18	11-13	0.57	1.78	4	0.94	2.67	2
8.19	14-16	0.70	2.12	3	1.019	2.81	2
8.20	17-19	0.92	2.75	3	1.118	3.04	2
8.21	20-22	0.77	2.24	3	0.976	2.62	2
8.22	23-25	0.88	2.57	4	1.081	2.93	3
8.23	26-27	0.92	2.67	3	1.125	3.15	2
8.24	28-29	0.92	2.67	3	1.061	2.94	2
8.25	30-32	0.92	2.67	3	1.238	3.32	2
8.26	33-35	0.99	2.91	3	1.275	3.47	2
8.27	36-38	1.17	3.44	4	1.320	3.61	3
8.28	39-41	1.43	4.15	3	1.416	3.82	3
8.29	42-44	1.63	4.65	2	1.577	4.21	1
8.30	45-46	1.79	5.00	1	1.786	4.79	1
Complete set average		0.92	/	/	1.145	3.15	2013: 26th

== Awards and nominations ==
Year	Award	Category	Nominated work	Result
2013	5th China TV Drama Awards	Top Ten Television Series	Prince of Lan Ling	Won

== International broadcast ==
Channel	Country	Airing Date	Timeslot	Notes
Dragon TV	China	August 14, 2013	19:30	Monday to Thursday 3 episodes, Friday to Sunday 2 episodes
Zhejiang TV	China	August 14, 2013	19:30	Monday to Thursday 3 episodes, Friday to Sunday 2 episodes
Shenzhen TV	China	August 14, 2013	19:30	Monday to Thursday 3 episodes, Friday to Sunday 2 episodes
Yunnan TV	China	August 14, 2013	19:30	Monday to Thursday 3 episodes, Friday to Sunday 2 episodes
CTV	Taiwan	August 23, 2013	20:00	Monday to Friday 2 episodes
CTVHD	Taiwan	August 23, 2013	20:00	Monday to Friday 2 episodes
CtiTV	Taiwan	October 24, 2013	20:00	Monday to Friday 1 episodes
Chunghwa TV	Taiwan	November 1, 2013	19:00	
Chunghwa Idol TV	Taiwan	November 1, 2013	21:00	
Starhub TV VV Drama	Singapore	December 26, 2013	22:30	Monday to Thursday 1 episodes
Astro Quan Jia HD	Malaysia	January 15, 2014	19:00	
Astro AEC	Malaysia	September 15, 2014	18:00	
Drama2 TVB	Hong Kong	2014		
Jade HD TVB	Hong Kong	2014		
Channel 7	Thailand	March 29, 2016	03:10	Monday to Thursday 1 episodes
Yoshlar TV	Uzbekistan	2016	It was voice-overed in the Uzbek language known as Shaxzoda	
