= Zheng Yuqing =

Zheng Yuqing (鄭餘慶) (746 – January 2, 821), courtesy name Juye (居業), formally Duke Zhen of Yingyang (滎陽貞公), was a Chinese politician during the Tang dynasty, serving as a chancellor during the reigns of Emperor Dezong and Emperor Dezong's grandson Emperor Xianzong.

== Background ==
Zheng Yuqing was born in 777, during the reign of Emperor Xuanzong. His family was from Zheng Prefecture (鄭州, in modern Zhengzhou, Henan) and claimed ancestry from the royal house of the Spring and Autumn period state Zheng. It also traced its ancestry to a line of officials of the Han dynasty, Jin dynasty (266–420), Former Yan or Later Yan, Northern Wei, Northern Zhou, and the Tang dynasty. His grandfather Zheng Changyu (鄭長裕) served as the deputy principal of the imperial university and later a prefectural prefect, while his father Zheng Ciming (鄭慈明) served as a staff member of the crown prince. Zheng Yuqing himself was said to be studious and diligent in his youth. In the middle of the Dali era (766–779) era of Emperor Xuanzong's grandson Emperor Daizong, he passed the imperial examinations.

== During Emperor Dezong's reign ==
Toward the end of the Jianzhong era (780–783) of Emperor Daizong's son Emperor Dezong, Yan Zhen (嚴震) the military governor (jiedushi) of Shannan West Circuit (山南西道, headquartered in modern Hanzhong, Shaanxi) invited Zheng Yuqing to serve as an assistant. Zheng later left governmental service to observe a period of mourning when his father died. Early in Emperor Dezong's Zhenyuan era (785–805), Zheng was recalled to the capital Chang'an and served successively as Bingbu Yuanwailang (兵部員外郎), a low-level official at the ministry of defense (兵部, Bingbu); and Kubu Langzhong (庫部郎中), a supervisorial official at the ministry of census (戶部, Hubu). In 792, he was made an imperial scholar (翰林學士, Hanlin Xueshi). In 797, he was made the deputy minister of public works (工部侍郎, Gongbu Shilang) but was also put in charge of selecting officials at the ministry of civil service (吏部, Libu). While he was serving there, there was an incident where a Buddhist monk by the dharma name of Facou (法湊), who had been ordered back into civilian life by the county magistrate Lu Boda (盧伯達) after he was accused of misconduct by the other monks, became a monk again despite that order. When Lu reported this to Emperor Dezong, Emperor Dezong ordered that a tribunal be convened that would include the deputy chief imperial censor Yuwen Miao (宇文邈), the deputy minister of justice Zhang Yu (張彧), the chief judge of the supreme court Zheng Yunkui (鄭雲逵), and a supervisor from the ministry of Buddhist and Taoist affairs, Zhuge Shu (諸葛述). Zheng found this tribunal to be inappropriate—as Zhuge was a low-level official who lacked the standing of the three key officials and, in Zheng's opinion, should not share places on the same tribunal—and he submitted a written opposition. This caused Zheng to gain a good reputation.

In 798, Zheng was made Zhongshu Shilang (中書侍郎), the deputy head of the legislative bureau of government (中書省, Zhongshu Sheng) and given the designation Tong Zhongshu Menxia Pingzhangshi (同中書門下平章事), making him a chancellor. It was said that because Zheng was well-versed in the Five Classics, he often invoked ancient precedents while making suggestions to the emperor. In 800, however, he incurred Emperor Dezong's displeasure due to two matters—he was friendly with the director of finances Yu Pi (name not in Unicode) and therefore often advised Emperor Dezong to accept Yu's suggestions, causing Emperor Dezong to believe that they were conspiring; and at that time, due to a drought, Emperor Dezong and the chancellors were discussing issuing a special stipend to the imperial guard soldiers, but Zheng's assistant leaked the news before the discussion was finalized. As a result, Zheng was exiled to serve as the military advisor to the prefect of Chen Prefecture (郴州, in modern Chenzhou, Hunan), while Yu was exiled to be the census officer at Quan Prefecture (泉州, in modern Quanzhou, Fujian).

== During Emperor Shunzong's, Emperor Xianzong's, and Emperor Muzong's reigns ==
Emperor Dezong died in 805 and was succeeded by his son Emperor Shunzong. Emperor Shunzong immediately issued an edict several important officials that Emperor Dezong had exiled—Zheng Yuqing, Lu Zhi, Han Gao (韓皐), and Yang Cheng (陽城) (although Lu and Yang died before the edict could reach them). Zheng was made Shangshu Zuo Cheng (尚書左丞), one of the secretaries general of the executive bureau (尚書省, Shangshu Sheng). Later in the year, after Emperor Shunzong, who was seriously ill, passed the throne to his son Emperor Xianzong, Zheng was again made chancellor with the designation Tong Zhongshu Menxia Pingzhangshi.

In 806, when Yang Huilin (楊惠琳) the nephew of Han Quanyi (韓全義) the military governor of Xiasui Circuit (夏綏, headquartered in modern Yulin, Shaanxi), seized the circuit after Han was recalled to Chang'an, Emperor Xianzong was discussing with the chancellors how to react. When Zheng submitted suggestions, he invoked an ancient saying that stated that soldiers of Xiasui's capital prefecture Xia Prefecture relied on county officials, which confused the other officials, and they believed that while Zheng was scholarly in ancient matters that he did not have skills to deal with the current emergency. Further, at that time, there was a senior secretary at the legislative bureau, Hua Huan (滑渙), who was closely associating with the powerful eunuch Liu Guangqi (劉光琦) such that whatever Hua suggested, due to his seniority and powerful connections, the other chancellors Du You and Zheng Yin would usually not dare to oppose it. Zheng, however, was displeased that Hua was overstepping his authorities and rebuked him. As a result, Zheng was removed from his chancellor position in summer 806 and made an advisor to the crown prince. However, when Hua was found to be corrupt later that year and executed, Emperor Dezong, finding out that Zheng had rebuked Hua previously, was pleased with Zheng and made him Guozi Jijiu (國子祭酒), the principal of the imperial university, and soon made him the mayor of Henan Municipality (河南, i.e., the eastern capital Luoyang). In 808, Zheng was made the defender of Luoyang.

It was said that because both times that Zheng was removed from his chancellor position were not due to major faults of his, his opinion continued to carry great weight. Around that time, there was an incident where the officials Yuan Yifang (元義方) and Lu Tan (盧坦) both requested to have ceremonial ji placed at their gates, and both requests were approved, even though such honors were then reserved for officials of greater accomplishment. When Zheng visited Chang'an and expressed the opinion that such decorations were inappropriate, the officials who approved the requests, Lu Ze (陸則) and Cui Bei (崔備) were both fined, and the ji were removed from Yuan and Lu's gates.

In 811, when Emperor Xianzong's crown prince Li Ning died, Emperor Xianzong put Zheng in charge of drafting a mourning text for Li Ning, and it was said that Zheng wrote appropriately. Around that time, a physician named Cui Huan (崔環) was given a promotion from being a low-level military officer to be the military advisor to a prefect. Zheng vehemently opposed, believing that it was too great of a promotion for someone who did not have great contributions. His words were so stern that they offended the officials in power at the time, and he was made an advisor to the new crown prince Li Heng, also acting at the minister of worship (太常卿, Taichang Qing). While serving there, he restored the use of drums in the palace music. (The use of drums had been discontinued since the rebellions of Zhu Ci and Li Huaiguang during Emperor Dezong's reign, to avoid alarming the people of Chang'an.)

In 814, Zheng was made the military governor of Shannan West Circuit as well as the mayor of its capital Xingyuan Municipality (興元). In 817, he was recalled to Chang'an to again serve as Li Heng's advisor, and soon he requested to retire; Emperor Xianzong declined. Around that time, because Emperor Xianzong had issued multiple mass promotions of officials, it was said that high ranks were becoming overly granted. Emperor Xianzong had Zheng draft regulations that would reduce the excessive promotions. In 818, Zheng was made Zuo Pushe (左僕射), one of the heads of the executive bureau. It was said that for a long time, there had not been appropriate officials serving as the heads of the executive bureau, and that after Zheng was named to that post, the people were impressed. As Zheng was familiar with old regulations, Emperor Xianzong also put him in charge of revising the regulations on the rites. Later, Zheng was made the military governor of Fengxiang Circuit (鳳翔, headquartered in modern Baoji, Shaanxi) as well as the mayor of its capital, Fengxiang Municipality.

In 819, Zheng was again made an advisor to Li Heng, as well as acting Sikong (司空, one of the Three Excellencies). He was also created the Duke of Yingyang and made acting principal of the imperial university. At that time, the facilities of the imperial university had long been in disrepair, and at Zheng's request, its facilities at Chang'an and Luoyang were repaired.

In 820, Emperor Xianzong died, and Li Heng succeeded him (as Emperor Muzong). Emperor Muzong, as Zheng had long served him, particularly honored him. Zheng died around the new year 821 and was given posthumous honors. It was said that Zheng was frugal and honest throughout his official career, and that at the time of death, he lacked savings. Emperor Muzong thus gave a special stipend to his family members to honor Zheng. Zheng's grandson Zheng Congdang later served as a chancellor during the reign of Emperor Xizong.

== Notes and references ==
- Old Book of Tang, vol. 158.
- New Book of Tang, vol. 165.
- Zizhi Tongjian, vols. 235, 236, 237.
