= Northern Qi =

Historical Chinese imperial dynasty

Qi 齊
- 550–577 AD
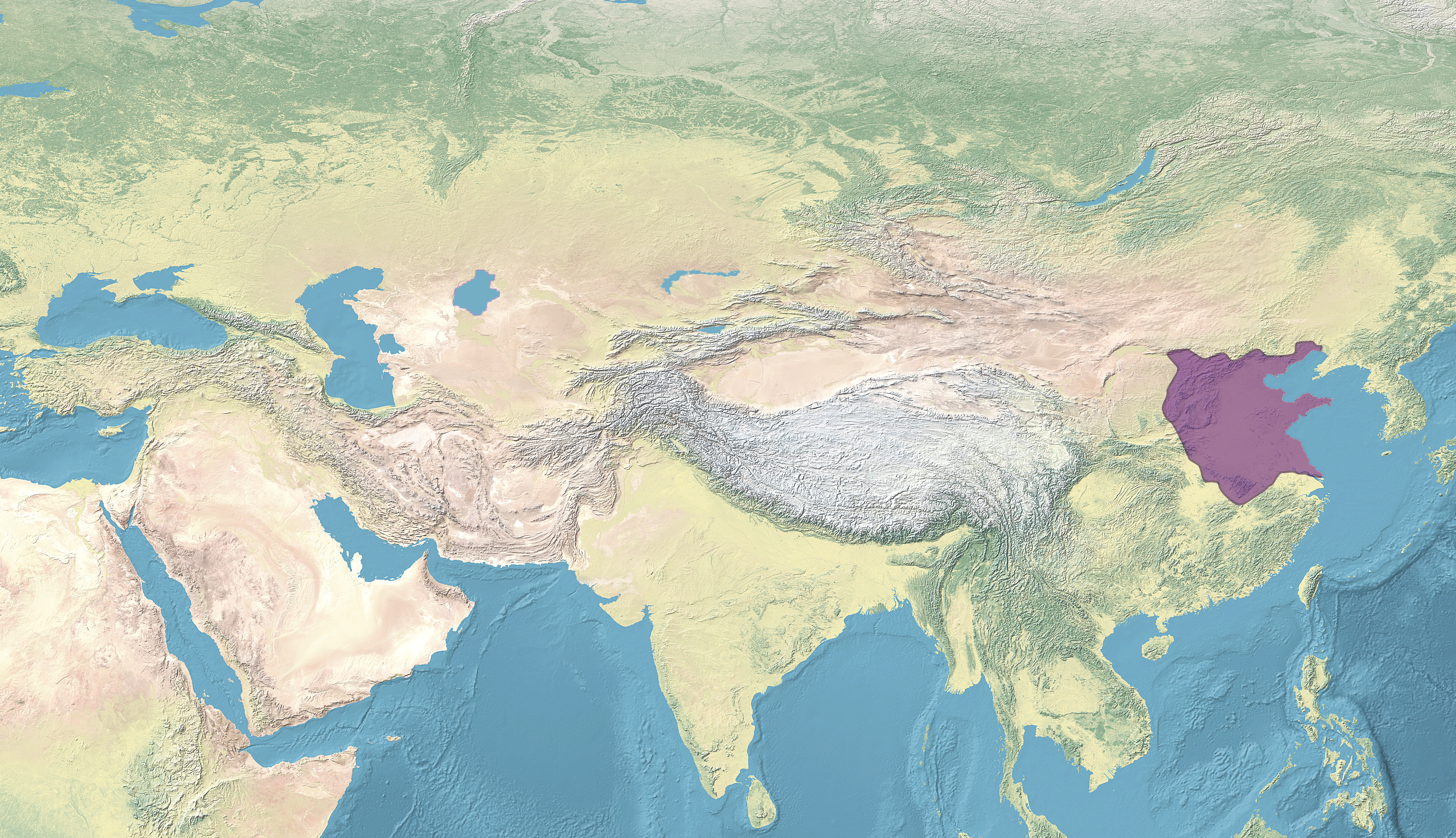
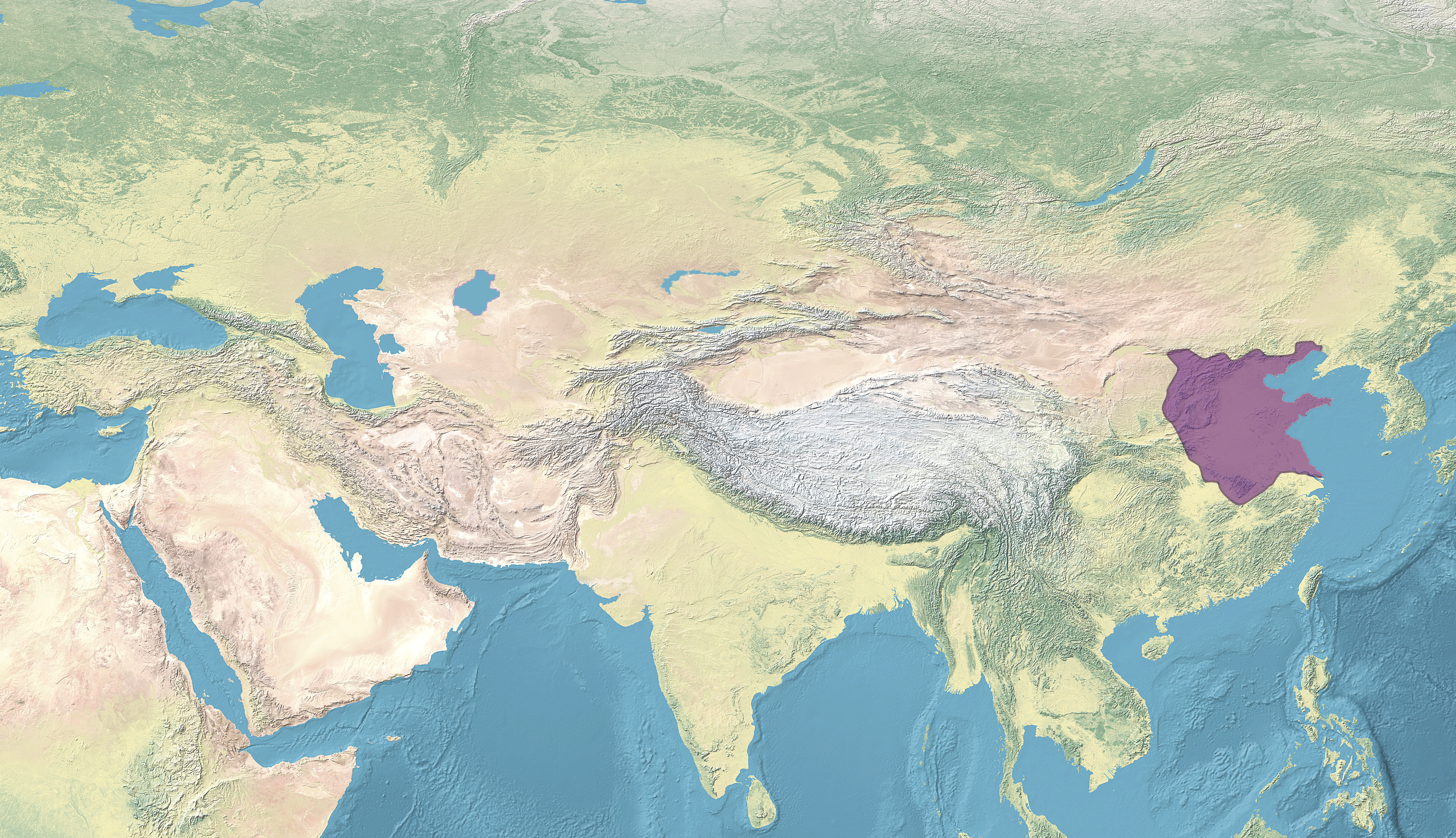
- The Northern Qi and main contemporary polities in Asia c. 576

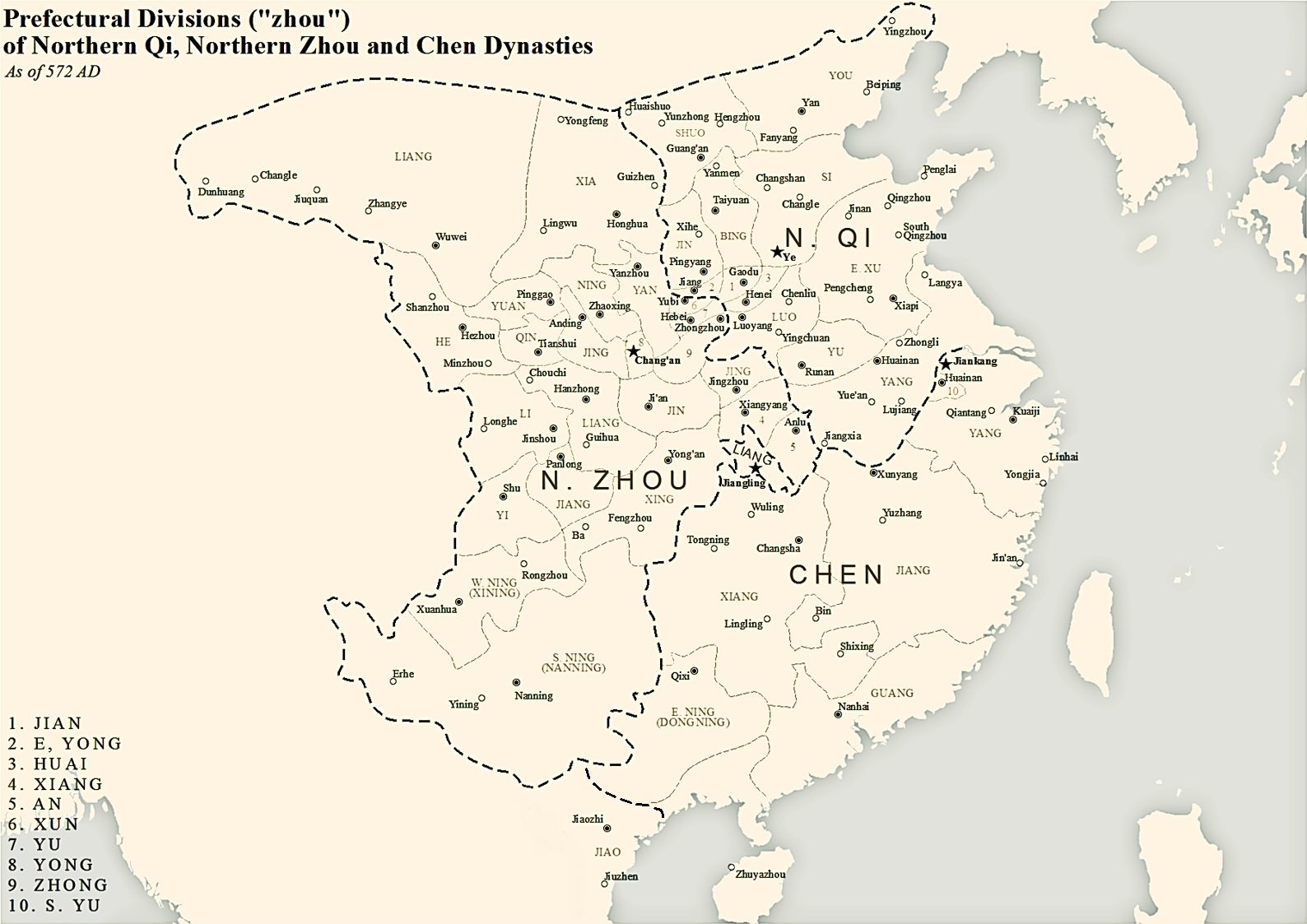
- Administrative divisions in 572 AD
- Capital: Yecheng
- Government: Monarchy
- Emperor
- Historical era: Northern Dynasties
  - Established: 9 June 550
  - Gao Wei and Gao Heng's capture by Northern Zhou, usually viewed as disestablishment: 28 February 577 AD
  - Gao Shaoyi's capture by Northern Zhou: 27 July 580

Area
- 557: 1,500,000 km^{2} (580,000 sq mi)
- Currency: Chinese coin, Chinese cash
Preceded by	Succeeded by
Eastern Wei	Northern Zhou
- Today part of: China

Qi, known as the Northern Qi (traditional Chinese: 北齊; simplified Chinese: 北齐; pinyin: Běi Qí; Wade–Giles: Pei^{3}-Ch'i^{2}), Later Qi (後齊) or Gao Qi (高齊) in historiography, was a Chinese imperial dynasty and one of the Northern dynasties during the Northern and Southern dynasties era. It ruled the eastern part of northern China from 550 to 577 AD. The dynasty was founded by Gao Yang (Emperor Wenxuan), and was eventually conquered by the Xianbei-led Northern Zhou dynasty in 577 AD.

== History ==
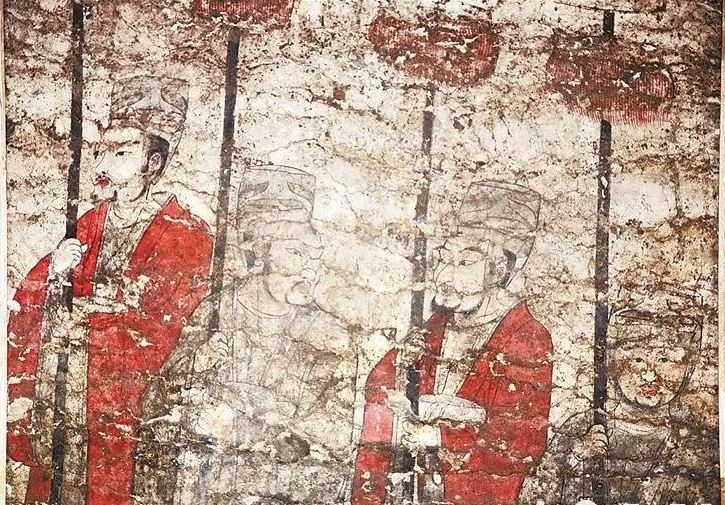
Mural painting from the tomb of Gao Yang.

Northern Qi was the successor state of the Chinese Xianbei state of Eastern Wei and was founded by Emperor Wenxuan. Emperor Wenxuan had a Han father of largely Xianbei culture, Gao Huan, and a Xianbei mother, Lou Zhaojun. As Eastern Wei's powerful minister Gao Huan was succeeded by his sons Gao Cheng and Gao Yang, who took the throne from Emperor Xiaojing of Eastern Wei in 550 and established Northern Qi as Emperor Wenxuan.

Northern Qi was the strongest state out of the three main states (the other two being Northern Zhou state and Chen Dynasty) in China when Chen was established. Northern Qi however was plagued by violence and/or incompetent emperors (in particular Houzhu), corrupt officials, and deteriorating armies. In 571, an important official who guided the emperors Emperor Wucheng and Houzhu, He Shikai, was killed. Houzhu attempted to strengthen the power of throne, instead he triggered a series of purges that became violent in late 573.

In 577, Northern Qi was assaulted by Northern Zhou, a northwestern kingdom with poorer resources. The Northern Qi, with ineffective leadership, quickly disintegrated within a month, with large scale defections of court and military personnel. Both Houzhu and the last emperor Youzhu were captured, and both died in late 577. Emperor Wenxuan's son Gao Shaoyi, the Prince of Fanyang, under protection by Tujue, later declared himself the emperor of Northern Qi in exile, but was turned over by Tujue to Northern Zhou in 580 and exiled to modern Sichuan. It is a matter of dispute whether Gao Shaoyi should properly be considered a Northern Qi emperor, but in any case the year 577 is generally considered by historians as the ending date for Northern Qi.

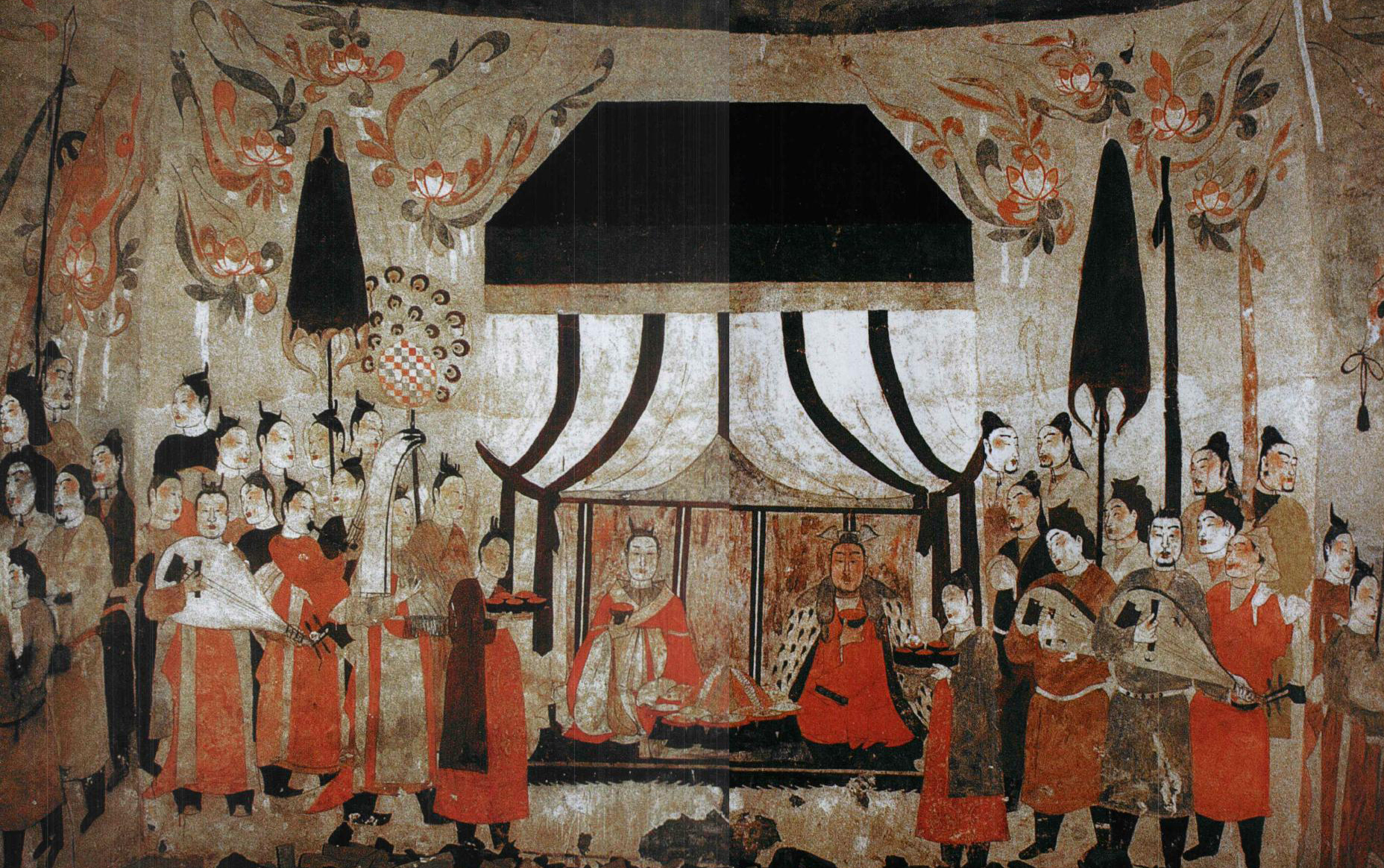
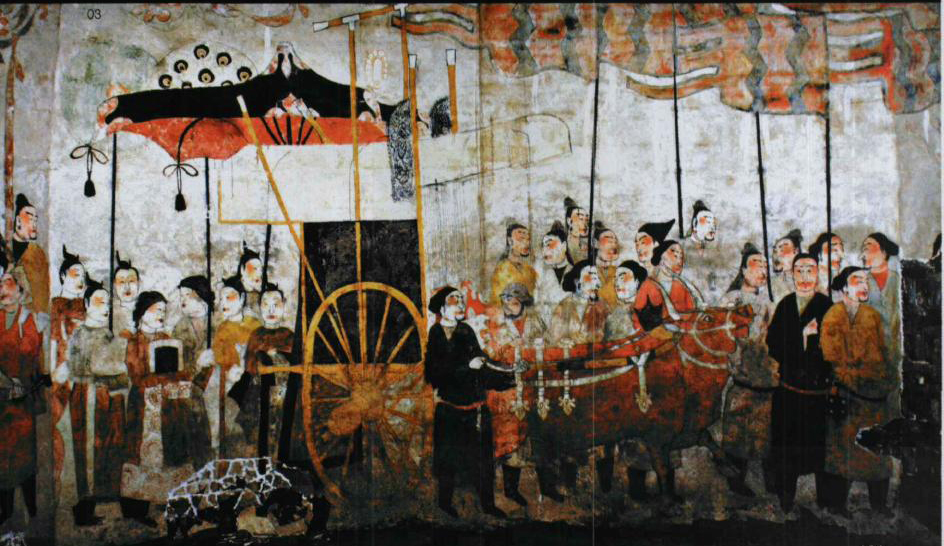
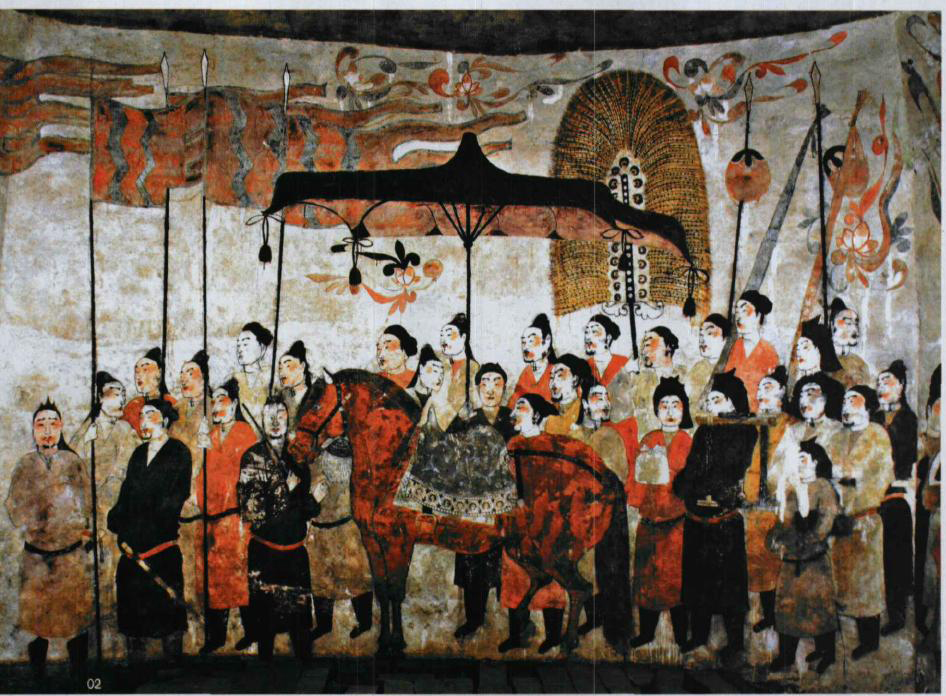
Mural paintings of court life in the tomb of Xu Xianxiu, Northern Qi Dynasty, 571 AD, located in Taiyuan, Shanxi province.

== Arts ==
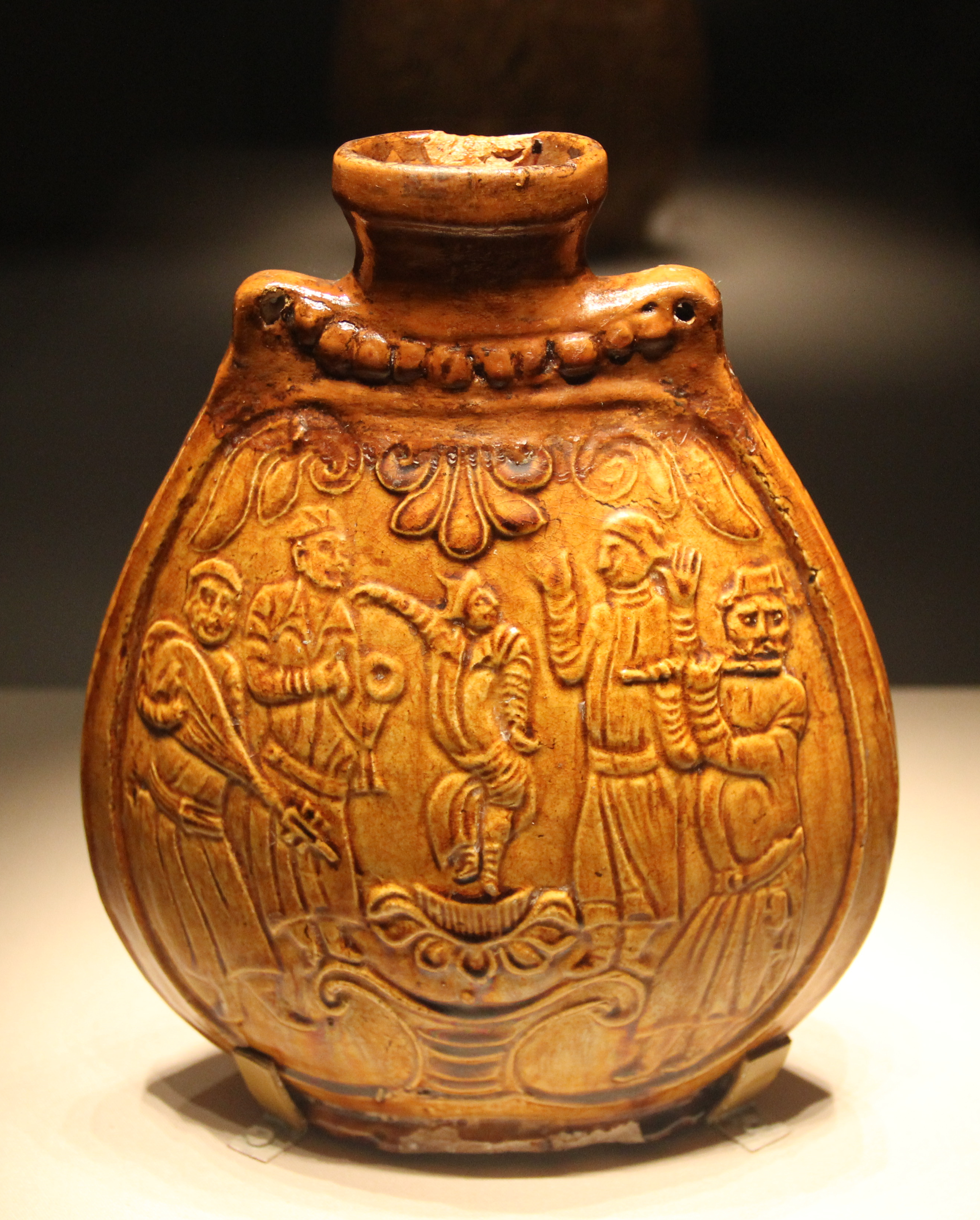
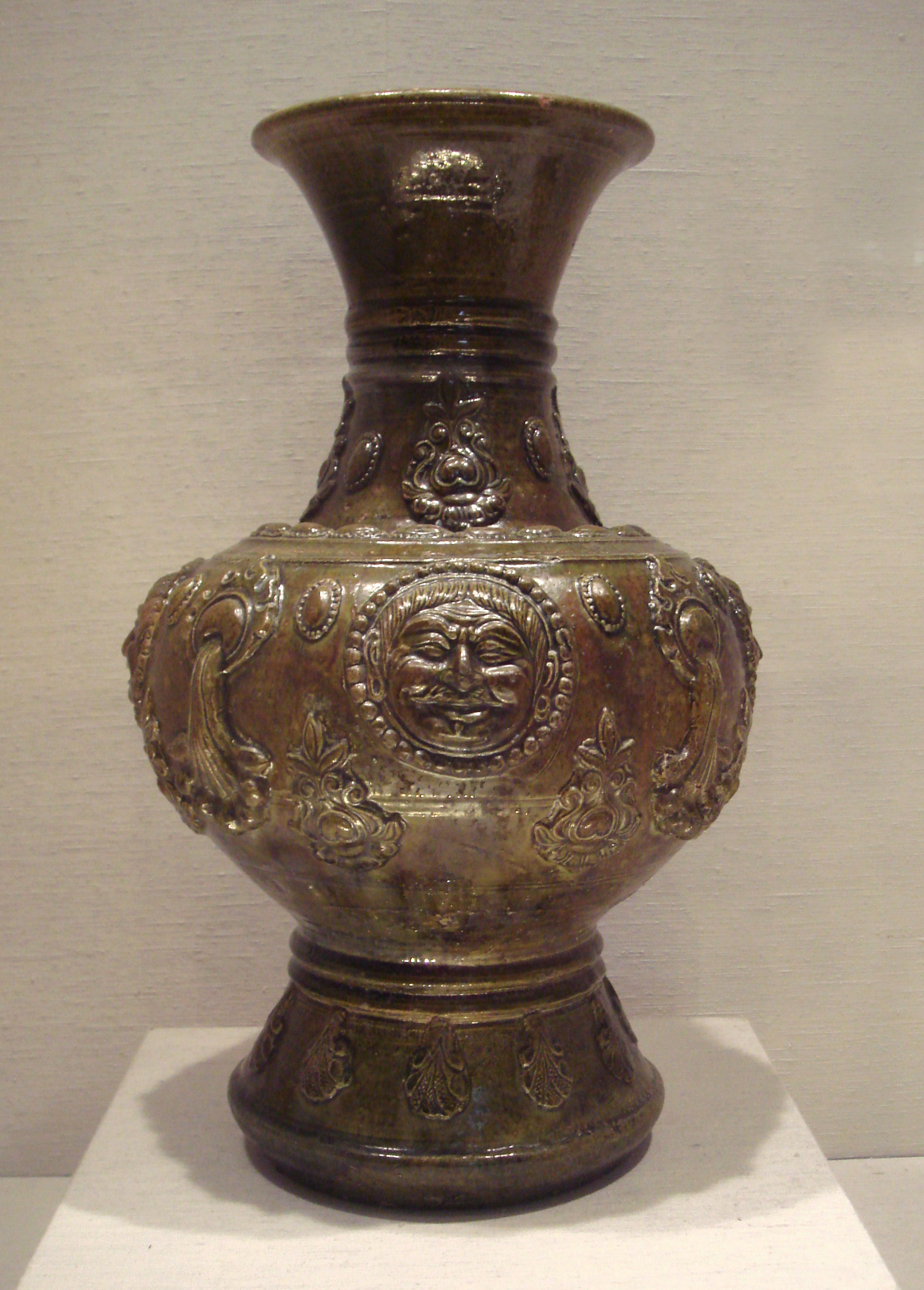
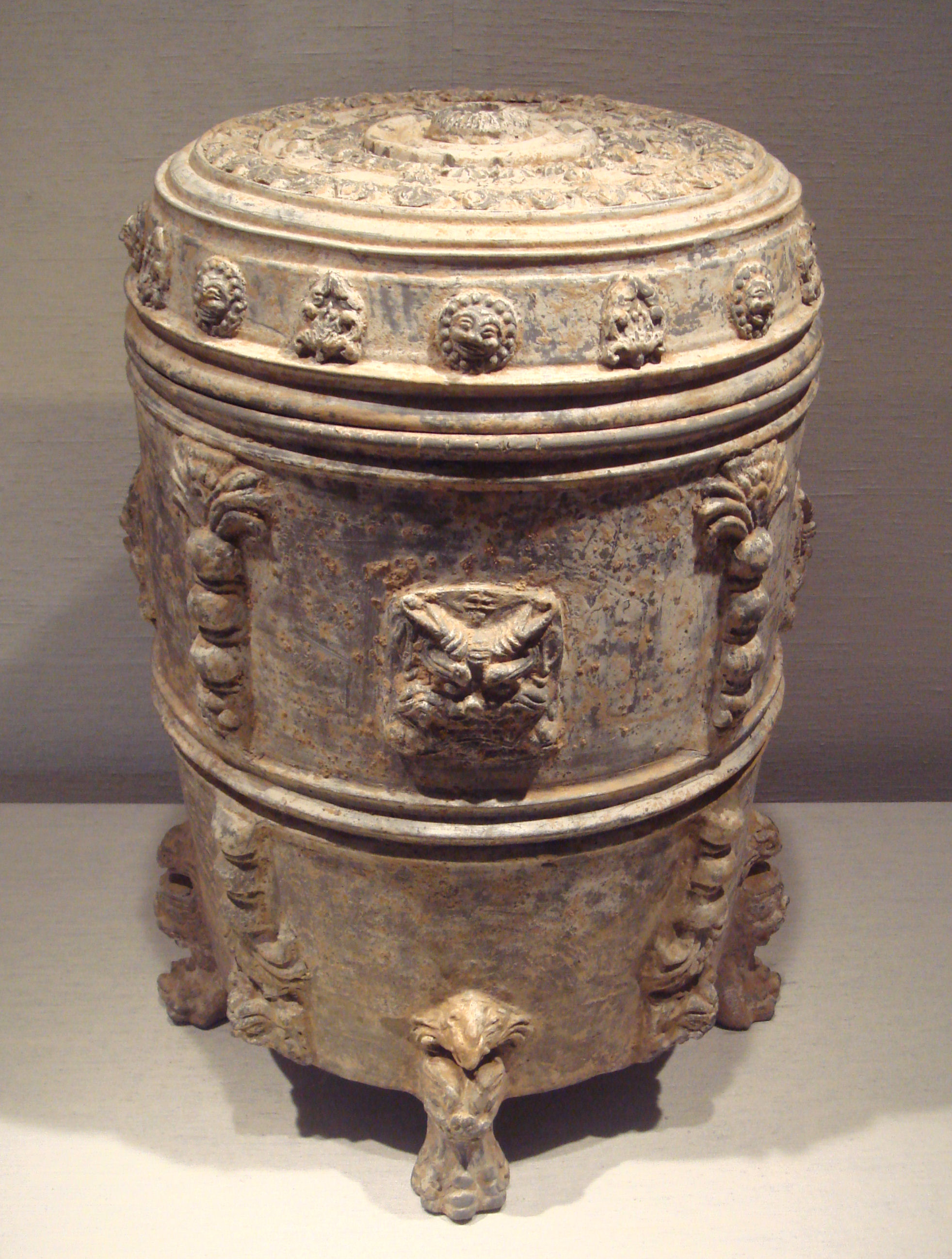
Left image: Northern Qi jar with Central Asian (probably Sogdian) dancer and musicians, from a tomb at Anyang, 575.
Middle image: Earthenware jar with Central Asian face, Northern Qi 550-577.
Right image: Northern Qi earthenware with multicultural (Egyptian, Greek, Eurasian) motifs, 550-577.

Northern Qi ceramics mark a revival of Chinese ceramic art, following the disastrous invasions and the social chaos of the 4th century. Northern Qi tombs have revealed some beautiful artifacts, such as porcelain with splashed green designs, previously thought to have been developed under the Tang dynasty.

Markedly unique from earlier depictions of the Buddha, Northern Qi statues tend to be smaller, around three feet tall, and columnar in shape.

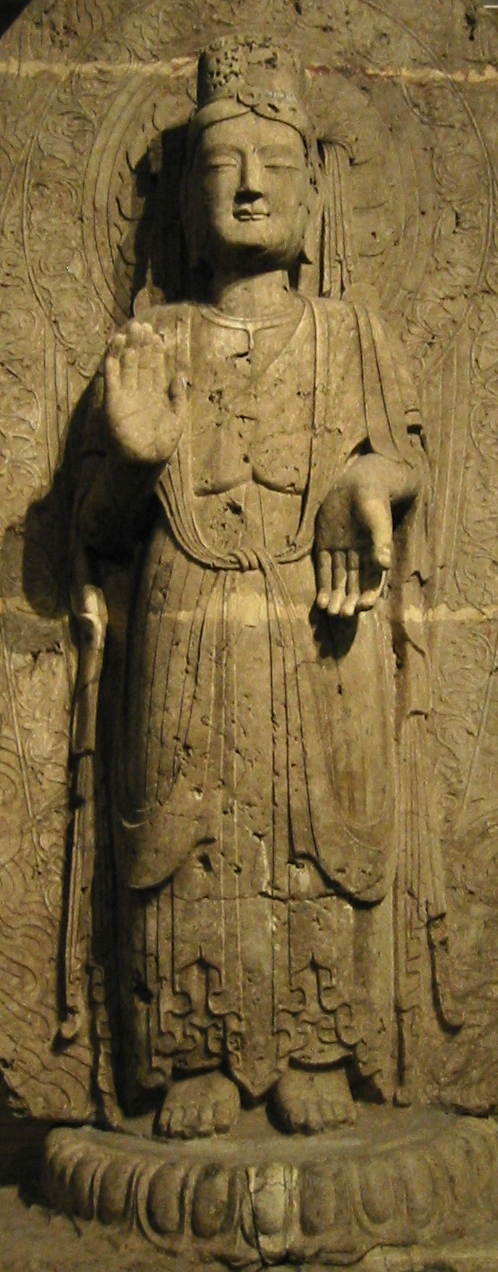
Northern Qi Bodhisattva, Changzi-xian, Shanxi, dated 552.

A jar has been found in a Northern Qi tomb, which was closed in 576, and is considered as a precursor of the Tang Sancai style of ceramics.

Also, brown glazed wares designed with Sasanian-style figures have been found in these tombs. These works suggest a strong cosmopolitanism and intense exchanges with Western Asia, which are also visible in metalworks and relief sculptures across China during this period. Cosmopolitanism was therefore already current during the Northern Qi period in the 6th century, even before the advent of the notoriously cosmopolitan Tang dynasty, and was often associated with Buddhism.

=== Cave temples and Buddhist sculpture ===
Buddhist sculpture reached a stylistic peak during the Northern Qi dynasty, transitioning from the stylized, linear drapery of the Northern Wei toward a more rounded, cylindrical bodily form with thin, clinging garments influenced by Indian Gupta-period styles. The imperial court sponsored major rock-cut cave temples and monastic sculptural centers across its territories:

- Xiangtangshan Caves (響堂山石窟): Located near the secondary capital of Handan (Fengfeng Mining District, Hebei), these grottoes served as the primary imperial cave temple project of the Northern Qi court. Commissioned under the patronage of emperors such as Gao Yang and court elites, the complex features monumental rock-cut shrines, extensive stone-carved Buddhist sutras, and architectural high reliefs. Recent scholarship has also reconstructed a group of freestanding monster caryatid stone panels (*shenwang*) originally designed to decorate a square stone stupa base in the North Cave's elevated burial chamber niche, demonstrating a synthesis of Chinese mask motifs and Gandharan-influenced muscular modeling.

== Ethnocultural identity ==
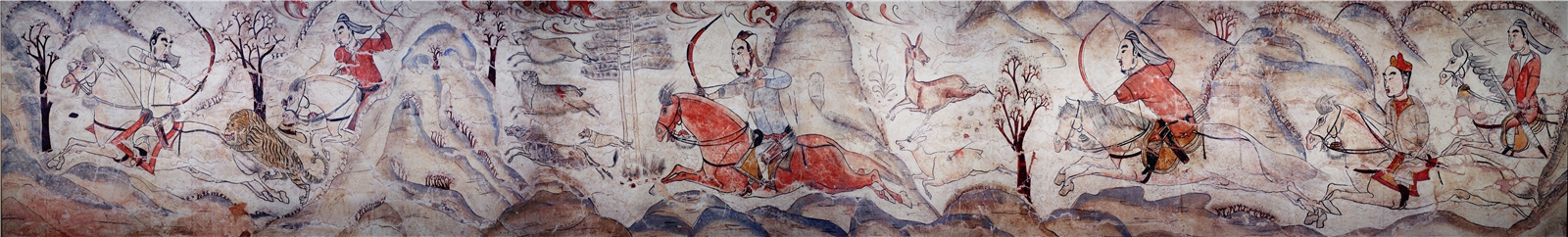
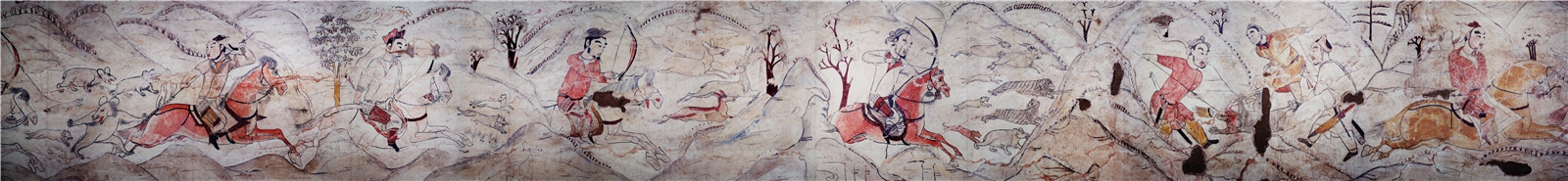
Murals from a tomb of the Northern Qi dynasty (550-577 AD) in Jiuyuangang, Xinzhou, showing a rural hunting scene on horseback.

The Northern Qi, although founded by a ruler of mixed Han/Xianbei origin, strongly asserted their Xianbei ethnic cultural identity. They regarded surviving ethnic Tuoba (themselves also Xianbei) and non-Han of the Northern Wei court and as well as literati of all ethnicities as near Han, referring to them as Han'er or Han kids (漢兒). However they employed Han and sometimes Central Asian courtiers. While some Qi elite families had expressed strongly anti-Han sentiments due to unclear reasons, they may also lay claim to Han elite origin. Emperor Wenxuan's father Gao Huan himself said different things to Han and Xianbei, saying to the Han Chinese that "The Xianbei are your clients, you give them a measure of grain and a bolt of cloth, and they fight for you and enable you to have peace and order, why do you hate them?" and he said in Xianbei to Xianbei people that "The Chinese are your slaves, they [the men] farm for you, the women make your clothing, they bring you your supplies and clothing, keeping you warm and full, why do you want to suppress them?". Gao Huan was descended from the Gao family of Bohai (渤海高氏), of ethnic Han descent in what is now modern Hebei. He had become Xianbeified as his family had lived for some time in Inner Mongolia after his grandfather was relocated from Bohai.

== Religions ==
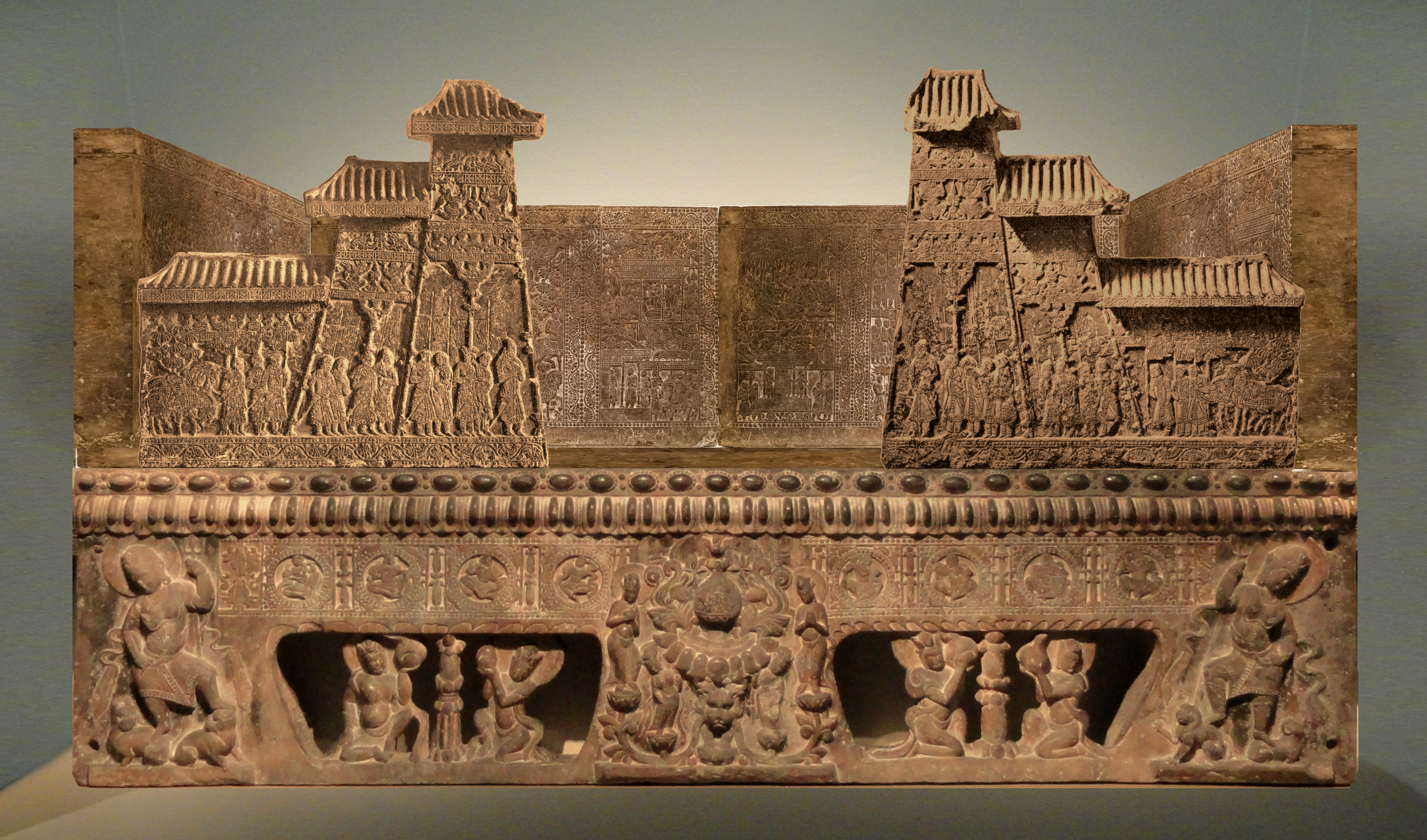
The Anyang funerary bed (550-577 CE), made for a Sogdian merchant in Anyang, during the Northern Qi dynasty.

Northern Qi's ruler Hou Zhu ordered Liu Shiqing to translate the Nirvana Sutra into a Turkic language to present to the Turkic Qagan, but scholarly research indicates there is no evidence that this translation was ever completed or delivered. Some Zoroastrianism influences that went into previous states continued onto the state of Northern Qi court, such as the love for Persian dogs (sacred in Zoroastrianism) as they were taken as pets by nobles and eunuchs. The Chinese utilized a number of Persian artifacts and products.

== Northern Qi Great Wall ==
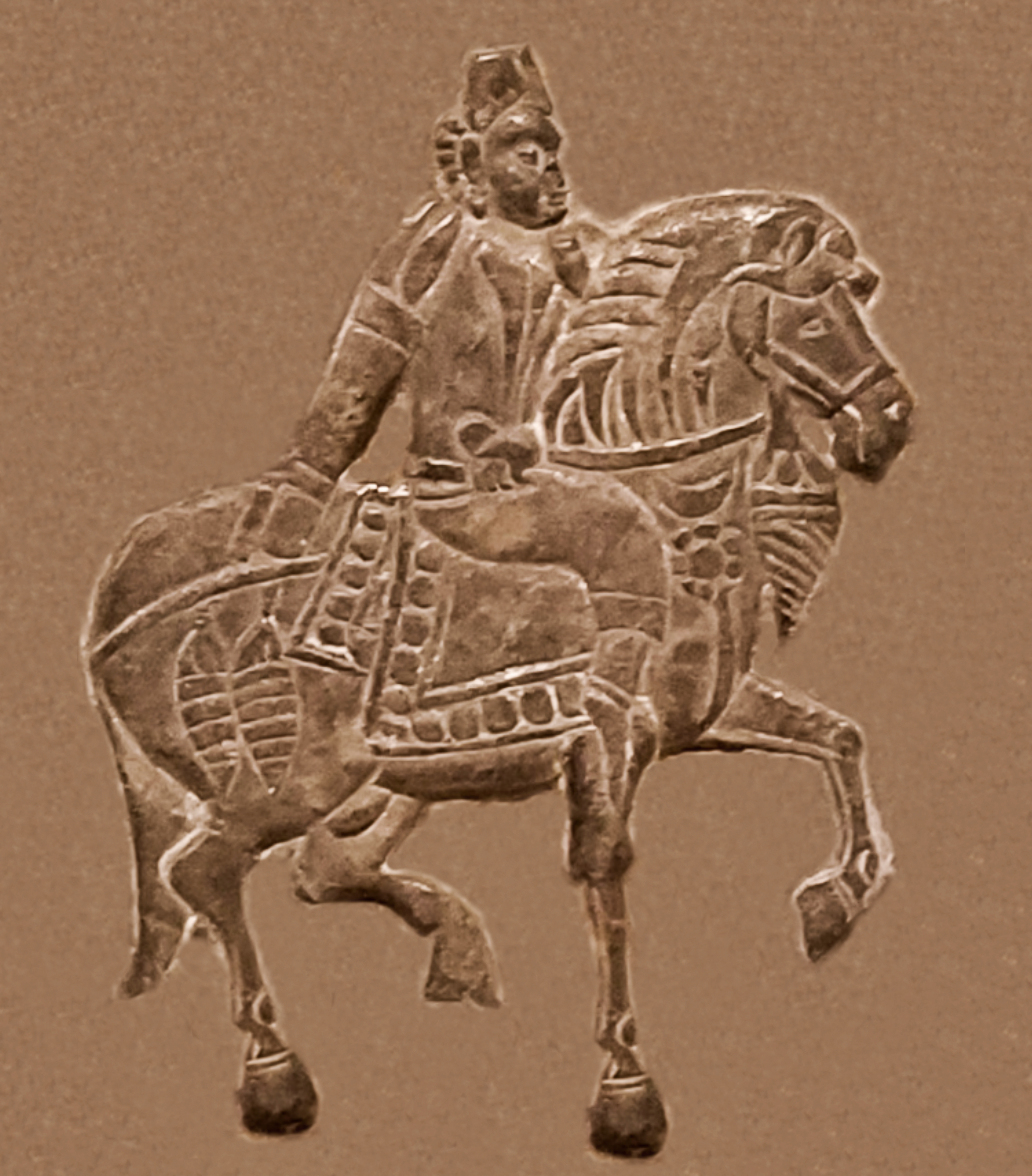
The owner of the Anyang funerary bed, a Sogdian merchant.

Faced with the threat of the Göktürks from the north, from 552 to 556 the Qi built up to 3,000 li (about 1,600 kilometres (990 mi)) of wall from Shanxi to the sea at Shanhai Pass. In 552, the Great Wall was built, starting at the northwest frontier, starting from Lishi (离石) and expanding towards west Shuoxian (朔县), with total length of over 400 kilometers.

In 555, Emperor Wenxuan commanded to repair and rebuild the existing Great Wall of Northern Wei. Over the course of the year 555 alone, 1.8 million men were mobilized to build the Juyong Pass and extend its wall by 450 kilometres (280 mi) through Datong to the eastern banks of the Yellow River. In 557 a secondary wall was built inside the main one, starting from east of Pianguan (偏关), passing Yanmen Pass, Pingxing (平型) Pass, and continuing to Xiaguan (下关) in Shanxi Province. In 563, Emperor Wucheng built a section of frontier wall along the Taihang Mountains on the border of Shanxi and Hebei provinces. These walls were built quickly from local earth and stones or formed by natural barriers. Two stretches of the stone-and-earth Qi wall still stand in Shanxi today, measuring 3.3 metres (11 ft) wide at their bases and 3.5 metres (11 ft) high on average. In 577 the Northern Zhou conquered the Northern Qi and in 580 made repairs to the existing Qi walls. The route of the Qi and Zhou walls would be mostly followed by the later Ming wall west of Gubeikou.

== Emperors ==
Posthumous Name	Personal Name	Period of Reign	Era Names
Emperor Wenxuan	Gao Yang	550–559	Tianbao (天保) 550–559
–	Gao Yin	559–560	Qianming (乾明) 560
Emperor Xiaozhao	Gao Yan	560–561	Huangjian (皇建) 560–561
Emperor Wucheng	Gao Zhan	561–565	Taining (太寧) 561–562; Heqing (河清) 562–565
–	Gao Wei	565-577 (Note: Gao Wei's cousin Gao Yanzong, the Prince of Ande (Gao Cheng's son), briefly declared himself emperor around the new year 577 after the soldiers guarding the city of Jinyang (晉陽, in modern Taiyuan, Shanxi) demanded that he claim the title when Gao Wei abandoned Jinyang. Gao Yanzong, however, was almost immediately defeated and captured by Northern Zhou troops, and therefore is generally not considered a true Northern Qi emperor.)	Tiantong (天統) 565–569; Wuping (武平) 570–576; Longhua (隆化) 576
–	Gao Heng	577 (Note: In 577, Gao Wei, then with the title Taishang Huang (retired emperor), tried to issue an edict on his son's behalf yielding the throne to his uncle (Gao Huan's son) Gao Jie (高湝) the Prince of Rencheng, but the officials he sent to deliver the edict to Gao Jie surrendered to Northern Zhou rather than delivering the edict to Gao Jie, who was subsequently also captured by Northern Zhou troops. It is questionable whether Gao Jie was even aware of the edict, and in any case, Gao Jie never used imperial title.) (Note: As noted above, Emperor Wenxuan's son Gao Shaoyi tried to establish a Northern Qi court in exile on Tujue's territory, but was not successful in his efforts in recapturing formerly Northern Qi territory, and was eventually turned over by Tujue to Northern Zhou. Most historians do not consider him a true Northern Qi emperor, although the matter remains in controversy.)	Chengguang (承光) 577

=== Emperors family tree ===
Northern Qi emperors

Gao Huan 高欢 (496–547)
Gao Cheng 高澄 (521–549)	Gao Yang 高洋 (526–559); Wenxuan (r. 550–559)	Empress Gao 高皇后	Gao Yan 高演 (535–561); Xiaozhao (r. 560–561)	Gao Zhan 高湛 (537–569); Wucheng (r. 561–565)	Gao Jie 高湝(?–577)
Gao Changgong 高长恭 d. 573; Prince of Lanling 蘭陵王	Gao Yanzong 高延宗 (?–578; r. 576)	Gao Yin 高殷 (545–561); Fei (r. 559–560)	Gao Shaoyi 高紹義 (b. 546; r. 578–580)	Gao Bainian 高百年 556–564	Gao Wei 高緯 (557–577); Houzhu (r. 565–577)	Gao Yan 高儼 (558–571)
Gao Heng 高恆 (570–577); Youzhu (r. 577)

== See also ==
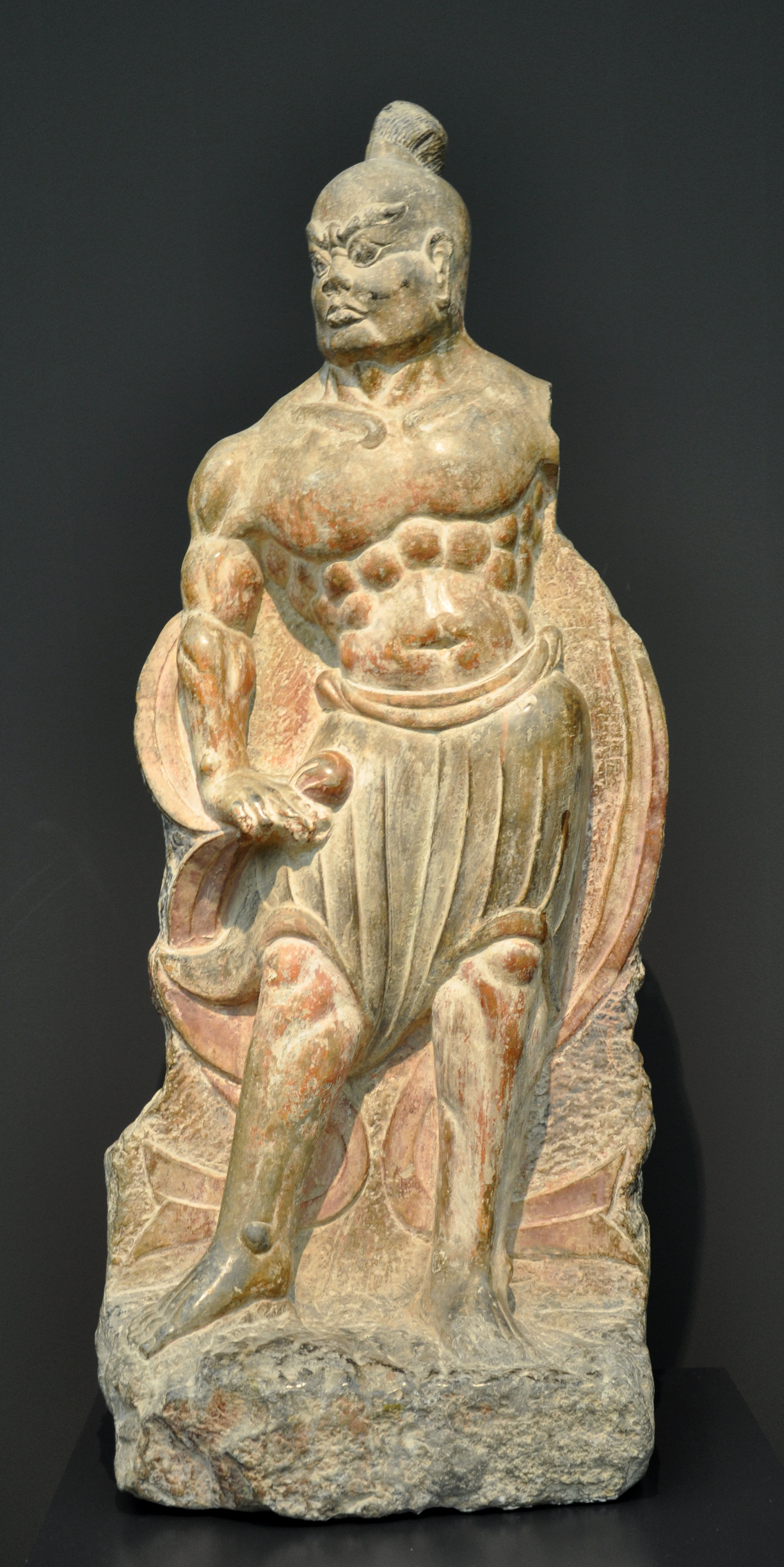
Temple guardian, Northern Qi

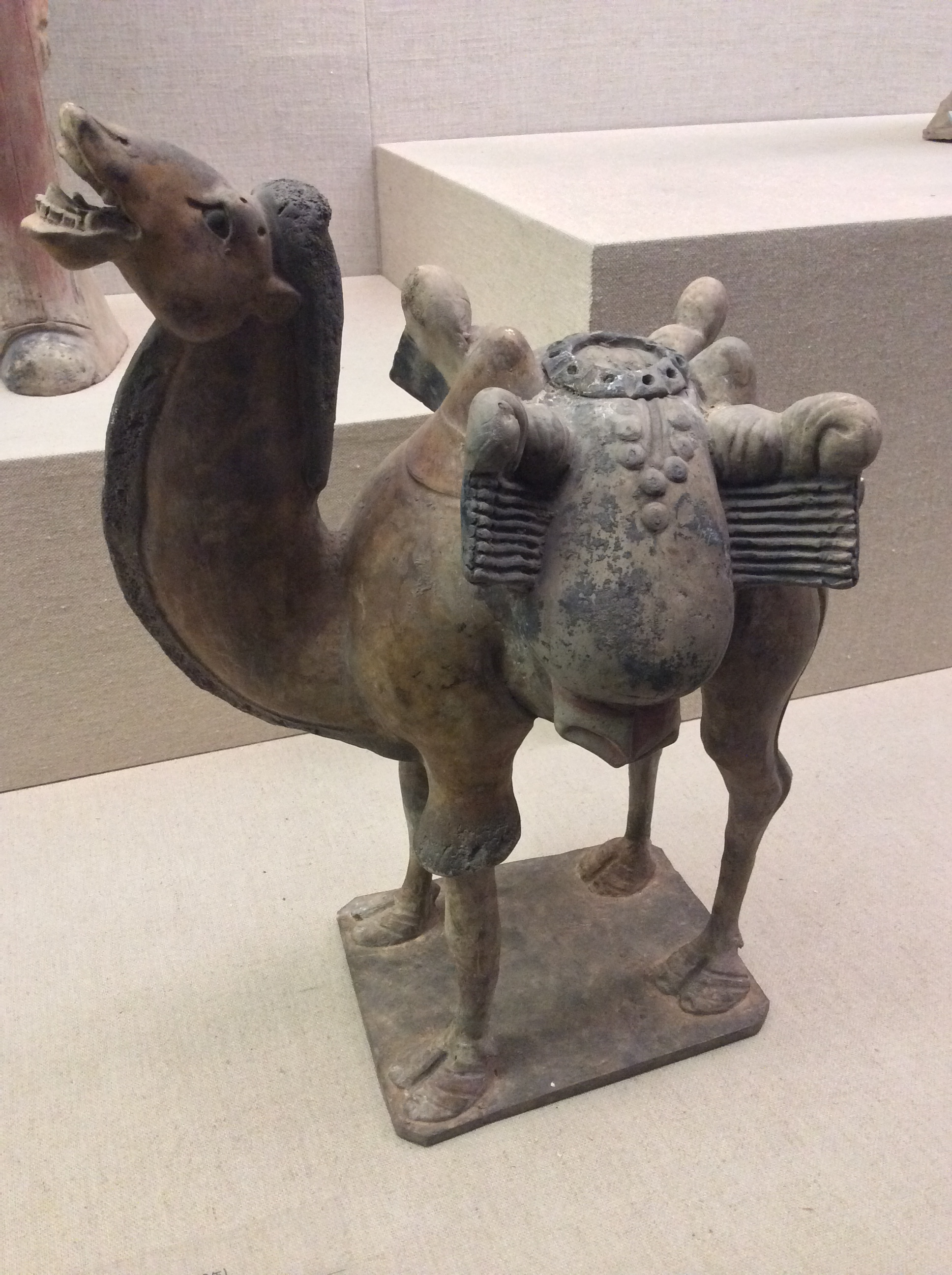
Camel, Tomb of Lou Rui (婁睿, 570 CE).

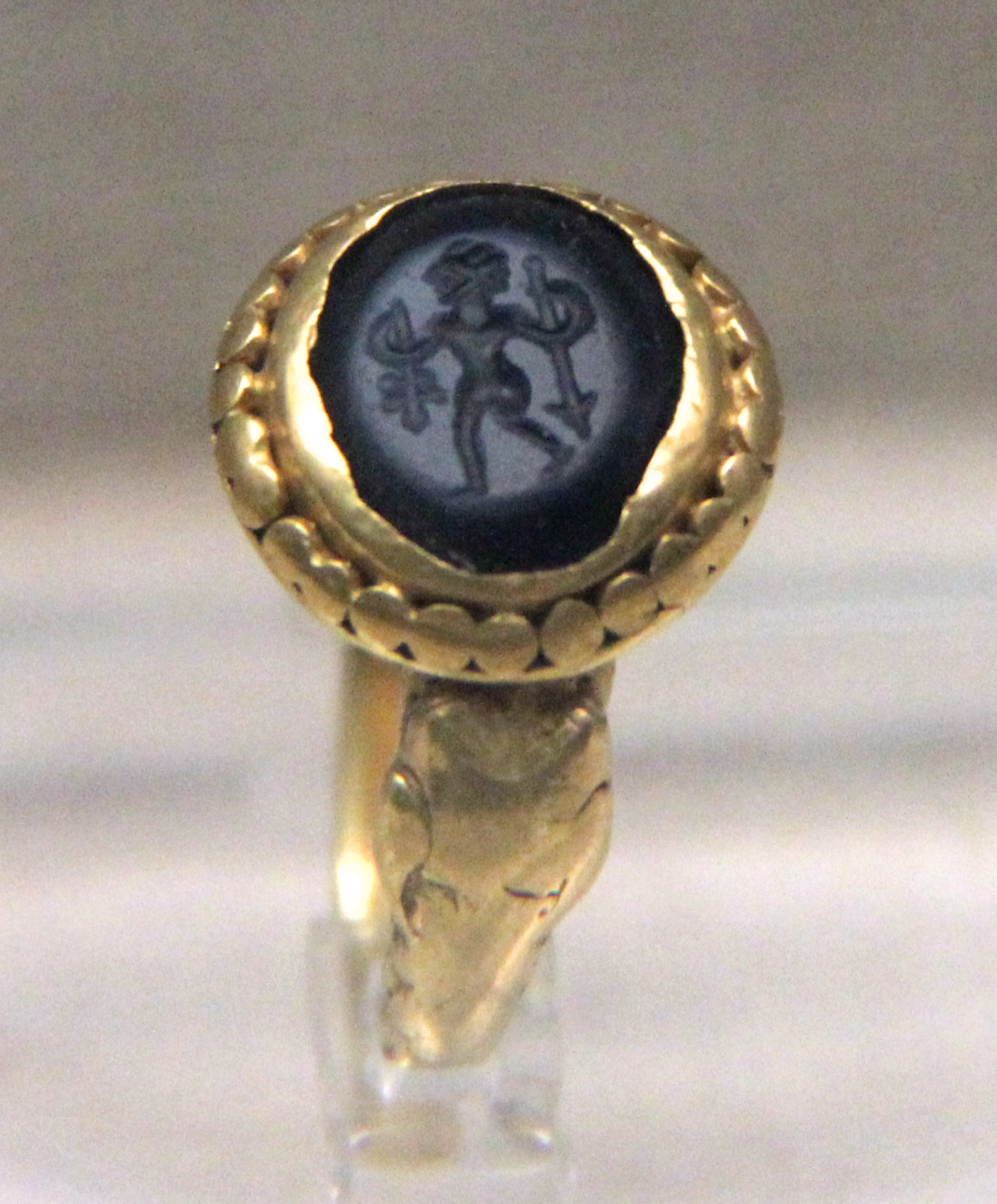
Gem-inlaid gold ring of Central Asian design, tomb of Xu Xianxiu, 571 CE.

- Buddhism in China
- Tomb of Lou Rui (570 CE)
- Monarchy of China
